= An Almanac of Liberty =

- Westinghouse Studio One episode
- Episode no.: Season 7 Episode 8
- Directed by: Paul Nickell
- Written by: Reginald Rose
- Original air date: November 8, 1954
- Running time: 60 minutes

Guest appearances
- Lee Richardson as Ben Philips; Sandy Kenyon as John Carter; Brandon Peters as Horace Sweetser; Lawrence Fletcher as George Wilkinson

Episode chronology
← Previous "The Man Who Owned the Town"	Next → "Let Me Go, Lover"

"An Almanac of Liberty" was an American television play broadcast on November 8, 1954, as part of the CBS television series, Westinghouse Studio One. The play is set in a village hall where citizens gather to discuss a mob attack the prior night on a new man in town who has expressed unpopular political views. The play explores the freedoms protected in the United States Bill of Rights.

The running time was 60 minutes including breaks hosted by Betty Furness, promoting Westinghouse open-handled irons, frost-free refrigerators, and automatic dishwashers.

== Plot ==
=== Part 1 ===
In a brief opening sequence, a mob is seen beating a man in the street until he is left unconscious.

Television journalist Charles Collingwood appears on screen to explain that the teleplay is based on the book released the same day by U.S. Supreme Court Justice William O Douglas.

Citizens begin entering the town hall and take seats. The man who was beaten, John Carter, is part of the group, as are the men who beat Carter.

After engaging in small talk, they realize that none of them knows who called the meeting or why. Having no known purpose for being there, the group decides to leave, but a thunder storm and sudden mid-day darkness stops them.

The newspaper editor, Ben Philips, asks the crowd why Carter was beaten, mostly by men in that room. The men reply that "he deserved every bit of it", "he's a dangerous guy," and "we don't need his kind around here".

The group realizes that the clock on the wall and all of their watches still show 10:24 – the same time it was when they entered the meeting. A telephone call to an automated time service confirms it is 10:24 exactly.

=== Part 2 ===
Time is standing still at 10:24. The attendees search for an explanation.

Carter says he doesn't know any of them and asks why they wanted to hurt him. One of the men says he heard from Wilkinson that Carter was saying un-American things. Wilkinson confronts Carter: "Everything about you offends me. You're a trouble-maker. You talk too much. I don't like strangers and particularly I don't like strangers that criticize and disagree." Mr. Nathan, a tailor with a foreign accent, defends Carter. Wilkinson tries to shut Nathan down, but Nathan continues to defend Carter's right to speak.

An elderly woman blames Carter for the stoppage of time, the sudden darkness, and the storm. She believes Carter brought them there like lambs to the slaughter. The mob grabs Carter and says they need to search him. Ben, the newspaper editor, stops the mob and insists that they respect Carter's rights.

Horace Sweetser, the head of the town council, challenges Ben as a rabble-rouser and says that, when this is over, they will stop Ben from printing the things he does. Sweetser's son challenges his father and speaks in defense of freedom of the press. Another man, Sam Hunt, says that boys like Sweetser's son are learning foreign ideas in school. Hunt says he should drive his tractor through the school. The head of the school defends exposing the kids to a variety of ideas, so they can choose for themselves which ideas are good ones.

=== Part 3 ===
Wilkinson hits Carter in the face. Time then moves backward to 10:23. Someone suggests time is moving backward because of the blow. Sweetser suggests they can solve the problem by throwing Carter out of the town hall, but this time the crowd does not follow him. Even Wilkinson has a change of heart and won't support Sweetser.

They realize that the date is December 15. A schoolboy says it was on December 15, 1789, that Congress approved the Bill of Rights. Ben says they attacked a man for saying unpopular things. Ben asks the crowd about their freedoms, and each member of the group recites a right protected by the Bill of Rights. Ben says those are the rights that make them strong and free. They must not let anyone destroy those rights.

The crowd now stands united, the clock on the wall begins moving forward, and the crowd then disperses.

== Cast ==
The credits at the end of the production listed players in their order of appearance, as follows:

- P. J. Kelly as Mr. Neary
- Archie Smith as Harmon
- Ethel Everett as Mrs. Church
- Bruce Marshall a Mikey
- Ginger MacManus as Susie
- Florence Sundstrom as Ottilie Sweetser
- Brandon Peters as Horace Sweetser
- Dorothy Patten as Matty Wilkinson
- Karl Lukas as Hank
- Jack MacGregor as Sam Hunt
- Clarice Blackburn as Sybil Hunt
- Fred Herrick a Ted Franklin
- Gene Sultan as Billy Sweetser
- James Winslow as Dr. Slattery
- Eli Mintz as Mr. Nathan
- Frieda Altman as Mrs. Nathan
- Lawrence Fletcher as George Wilkinson
- Lee Richardson as Ben Philips
- Sandy Kenyon as John Carter
- Martin Rudy as Mr. Falion

Narrated by Charles Collingwood

== Production ==
The teleplay was written for Studio One by Reginald Rose, based on the book written by William O. Douglas. It was broadcast on November 8, 1954, as part of the CBS television series, Westinghouse Studio One.

Reginald Rose had won acclaim several weeks earlier with the broadcast of his teleplay Twelve Angry Men, also initially produced as an episode of Studio One.

The production was staged in New York City. Production credits, listed at the end of the production, were:

- Ted Miller - technical director
- Alfredo Antonini - musical director
- Robert L. Adams - set decorator
- Ralph Holmes - lighting
- Kim E. Swados - settings
- Florence Britton -story editor
- William M. Altman - associate producer
- Paul Nickell - director
- Felix Jackson - producer

Laci de Gerenda was credited with the title sculpture, a depiction of a kneeling man breaking his shackles. The sculpture appears in the opening and closing title sequences and at the end of the commercial intermissions.

== Critical reception ==
Television critic Bill Ladd criticized the production pacing and backward-moving clock gimmick. Ladd wrote: "While the theme was tremendous, the production moved along at a snail's pace and at times stood as still as the time. Producer Felix Jackson and the writer seemed so taken with their gimmick of the clock ... that the message got fouled up in the mechanics."
