= List of Studio One episodes =

Studio One is an American anthology drama television series adapted from a radio series. It was created in 1947 by Canadian director Fletcher Markle for CBS. It premiered on November 7, 1948, and ended on September 29, 1958, with a total of 467 episodes throughout 10 seasons.

== Series overview ==
Season	Episodes	Originally released	
Season	Episodes	First released	Last released
1	20	November 7, 1948	June 29, 1949
2	42	September 12, 1949	June 26, 1950
3	55	August 28, 1950	September 10, 1951
4	51	September 17, 1951	September 15, 1952
5	50	September 22, 1952	September 14, 1953
6	52	1953	September 13, 1954
7	52	September 20, 1954	1955
8	50	1955	1956
9	47	1956	1957
10	48	September 9, 1957	September 29, 1958

== Episodes ==
=== Season 1 (1948–49) ===
No. overall	No. in season	Title	Directed by	Written by	Original release date
1	1	"The Storm"	Worthington Miner	Story by : McNight Malmar; Teleplay by : Worthington Miner	November 7, 1948
2	2	"Let Me Do the Talking"	Paul Nickell	Story by : Richard Mealand; Teleplay by : Worthington Miner	November 26, 1948
3	3	"The Medium"	Paul Nickell	Story by : Gian Carlo Menotti; Teleplay by : Worthington Miner	December 12, 1948
A phony medium feels a pair of hands around her neck during one of her seances.
4	4	"Not So Long Ago"	Worthington Miner	Story by : Joseph Liss; Teleplay by : Worthington Miner	December 26, 1948
5	5	"The Outward Room"	Worthington Miner	Story by : Millen Brand; Teleplay by : Joseph Liss	January 9, 1949
A woman struggles to overcome her agoraphobia.
6	6	"Blind Alley"	Paul Nickell	Teleplay by : Worthington Miner; Based on a play by : James Warwick	January 30, 1949
7	7	"Holiday"	Worthington Miner	Teleplay by : Worthington Miner; Based on a play by : Philip Barry	February 20, 1949
A self-made man proposes to the daughter of a wealthy industrialist.
8	8	"Julius Caesar"	Paul Nickell	Teleplay by : Worthington Miner; Based on the play by : William Shakespeare	March 6, 1949
In an adaptation of William Shakespeare's play Julius Caesar, the Roman emperor is plotted against by conspiring senators.
9	9	"Berkeley Square"	Worthington Miner	Adapted by : John L. Balderston & J.C. Squire; From a story by : Henry James	March 20, 1949
10	10	"Redemption"	Paul Nickell	Adapted by : Sylvia Berger; From a story by : Leo Tolstoy	March 21, 1949
11	11	"Moment of Truth"	Worthington Miner	Story by : Margaret Storm Jameson; Teleplay by : Joseph Liss	April 17, 1949
12	12	"Julius Caesar"	Paul Nickell	Teleplay by : Worthington Miner; Based on the play by : William Shakespeare	May 1, 1949
Rebroadcast. In an adaptation of William Shakespeare's play Julius Caesar, the Roman emperor is plotted against by conspiring senators.
13	13	"The Glass Key"	George Zachary	Adapted by : Worthington Miner; From a story by : Dashiell Hammett	May 11, 1949
14	14	"Shadow and Substance"	Paul Nickell	Adapted by : Worthington Miner; From a story by : Paul Vincent Carroll	May 18, 1949
15	15	"Flowers from a Stranger"	Paul Nickell	Adapted by : Worthington Miner; From a story by : Dorothee Carousso	May 25, 1949
A psychiatrist's wife suffers an emotional breakdown when a stranger sends her a box of flowers.
16	16	"The Dybbuk"	Paul Nickell	Adapted by : Joseph Liss; From a play by : Sholom Ansky	June 1, 1949
A woman is possessed by the spirit of a dead man she pledged to marry.
17	17	"Boy Meets Girl"	George Zachary	Story by : Walter Hart; Teleplay by : Sam Spewack & Bella Spewack	June 8, 1949
18	18	"Smoke"	Paul Nickell	Adapted by : Edward Mabley and Worthington Miner; From a story by : Ivan Turgenev	June 15, 1949
A pair of Russian individuals have opposing philosophies in their changing community.
19	19	"June Moon"	Walter Hart	Adapted by : Gerald Goode; From a story by : George S. Kaufman and Ring Lardner	June 22, 1949
20	20	"The Shadowy Third"	Paul Nickell	Adapted by : Worthington Miner; From a story by : Ellen Glasgow	June 29, 1949

=== Season 2 (1949–50) ===
No. overall	No. in season	Title	Directed by	Written by	Original release date
21	1	"Kyra Zelas"	Paul Nickell	Adapted by : Worthington Miner; From a story by : Stanley G. Weinbaum	September 12, 1949
22	2	"The Rival Dummy"	Franklin J. Schaffner	Adapted by : Worthington Miner and David Opatoshu; From a story by : Ben Hecht	September 19, 1949
A ventriloquist's dummy comes to life and refuses to perform at an old vaudeville theater.
23	3	"The Outward Room"	Paul Nickell	Adapted by : Joseph Liss; From a story by : Millen Brand	September 26, 1949
Rebroadcast.
24	4	"Mrs. Moonlight"	Franklin J. Schaffner	Adapted by : William Jayme; From a story by : Benn W. Levy	October 3, 1949
25	5	"The Light That Failed"	Paul Nickell	Adapted by : Joseph Liss; From a story by : Rudyard Kipling	October 10, 1949
26	6	"The Storm"	Yul Brynner	Adapted by : Worthington Miner; From a story by : McNight Malmar	October 17, 1949
27	7	"Battleship Bismarck"	Paul Nickell	Adapted by : Worthington Miner; From a story by : Maurice Valency	October 24, 1949
Two weeks after its maiden voyage, the Battleship Bismarck is sunk by the British.
28	8	"Concerning a Woman of Sin"	Yul Brynner	Adapted by : Gerald Goode; From a story by : Ben Hecht	October 31, 1949
29	9	"The Husband"	Paul Nickell	Adapted by : Worthington Miner; From a story by : Natalie Anderson	November 7, 1949
30	10	"Two Sharp Knives"	Franklin J. Schaffner	Adapted by : Carl Bixby; From a story by : Dashiell Hammett	November 14, 1949
A small-town police chief searches for the murderer of an innocent man he arrested for murder.
31	11	"Of Human Bondage"	Paul Nickell	Adapted by : Sumner Locke Elliott; From the novel by : W. Somerset Maugham	November 21, 1949
A crippled medical student courts a heartless waitress.
32	12	"At Mrs. Beam's"	Franklin J. Schaffner	Adapted by : Charles Monroe; From the play by : C.K. Munro	November 28, 1949
33	13	"Henry IV"	Paul Nickell	Adapted by : Maurice Valency; From the play by : Luigi Pirandello	December 5, 1949
34	14	"Jane Eyre"	Franklin J. Schaffner	Adapted by : Sumner Locke Elliott; From the novel by : Charlotte Brontë	December 12, 1949
Nineteen-year-old Jane Eyre, whose life has been full of turmoil, falls for a man of higher social status.
35	15	"Mary Poppins"	Paul Nickell	Adapted by : Worthington Miner; From the books of : P.L. Travers	December 19, 1949
36	16	"The Inner Light"	Franklin J. Schaffner	Adapted by : Joseph Liss; From a story by : Hugo Csergo	December 26, 1949
37	17	"Riviera"	Paul Nickell	Adapted by : Worthington Miner; From a story by : Ferenc Molnár	January 2, 1950
38	18	"Beyond Reason"	Franklin J. Schaffner	Adapted by : Worthington Miner; From the radio play by : Devery Freeman	January 9, 1950
39	19	"Give Us Our Dream"	Paul Nickell	Adapted by : Worthington Miner; From a story by : Artemise Goertz	January 16, 1950
40	20	"The Rockingham Tea Set"	Franklin J. Schaffner	Adapted by : Matthew E. Harlib and Worthington Miner; From a story by : Virginia Douglas Dawson	January 23, 1950
41	21	"Father and the Angels"	Paul Nickell	Adapted by : David Shaw; From a story by : William Manners	January 30, 1950
42	22	"The Loud Red Patrick"	Franklin J. Schaffner	Adapted by : Worthington Miner; From a story by : Ruth McKenney	February 6, 1950
43	23	"Flowers from a Stranger"	Paul Nickell	Adapted by : Worthington Miner; From a story by : Dorothee Carousso	February 13, 1950
Rebroadcast. A psychiatrist's wife struggles to fight her emotional state when a stranger sends her a box of flowers.
44	24	"The Wisdom Tooth"	Franklin J. Schaffner	Adapted by : Worthington Miner; From a story by : Marc Connelly	February 20, 1950
A shy clerk's inner child encourages him to stand up to his boss and propose to his girlfriend.
45	25	"The Willow Cabin"	Paul Nickell	Adapted by : Sumner Locke Elliott; From a story by : Pamela Frankau	February 27, 1950
46	26	"The Dreams of Jasper Hornby"	Franklin J. Schaffner	Adapted by : Worthington Miner; From a story by : Kevin Mullen	March 6, 1950
47	27	"The Dusty Godmother"	Paul Nickell	Adapted by : Thomas Sugrue; From a story by : Michael Foster	March 13, 1950
48	28	"The Survivors"	Franklin J. Schaffner	Adapted by : Worthington Miner and Milton Wayne; From a story by : Irwin Shaw & Peter Viertel	March 20, 1950
A man returns from the Civil War with the intention of settling a score with his neighbor in a gunfight, but the two soon realize that the laws of the Old West are changing.
49	29	"Passenger to Bali"	Paul Nickell	Adapted by : Worthington Miner; From a story by : Ellis St. Joseph	March 27, 1950
A freighter captain discovers that the passenger he agreed to look after is not as innocent as he looks.
50	30	"The Scarlet Letter"	Franklin J. Schaffner	Adapted by : Joseph Liss; From the novel by : Nathaniel Hawthorne	April 3, 1950
In 1642 Boston, a woman is found guilty of adultery and sentenced to wear a scarlet "A" in shame.
51	31	"Walk the Dark Streets"	Paul Nickell	Adapted by : Worthington Miner; From a story by : William Krasner	April 10, 1950
52	32	"Torrents of Spring"	Franklin J. Schaffner	Adapted by : Joseph Liss; From a story by : Ivan Turgenev	April 17, 1950
A man abandons his sweetheart in order to court another woman, only to realize his mistake.
53	33	"The Horse's Mouth"	Paul Nickell	Adapted by : H. R. Hays; From a story by : Joyce Cary	April 24, 1950
An antisocial painter recently released from prison asks to be paid for his paintings.
54	34	"Miracle in the Rain"	Franklin J. Schaffner	Story by : Ben Hecht; Teleplay by : David Shaw	May 1, 1950
A lonely woman falls for a soldier back from World War II.
55	35	"A Wreath of Roses"	Paul Nickell	Adapted by : Charles Monroe; From a story by : Elizabeth Taylor	May 8, 1950
56	36	"The Ambassadors"	Franklin J. Schaffner	Story by : Henry James; Teleplay by : Howard Merrill	May 15, 1950
57	37	"The Room Upstairs"	Paul Nickell	Adapted by : Worthington Miner; From a story by : Mildred Davis	May 22, 1950
58	38	"The Man Who Had Influence"	Franklin J. Schaffner	Adapted by : Worthington Miner; From a story by : Don Mankiewicz	May 29, 1950
A politician's spoiled son is accused of murder.
59	39	"The Taming of the Shrew"	Paul Nickell	Adapted by : Worthington Miner; From the play by : William Shakespeare	June 5, 1950
In an adaptation of William Shakespeare's play The Taming of the Shrew, the gentleman Petruchio does everything to make the shrew Katherina his bride.
60	40	"Zone Four"	Franklin J. Schaffner	Adapted by : Worthington Miner; From a story by : Fielder Cook	June 12, 1950
61	41	"There Was a Crooked Man"	Paul Nickell	Adapted by : Charles Monroe; From a story by : Kelley Roos	June 19, 1950
A fat, jolly, crippled boarding house lodger is found murdered.
62	42	"My Granny Van"	Franklin J. Schaffner	Adapted by : Loren Disney; From a story by : George Sessions Perry and Loren Disney	June 26, 1950

=== Season 3 (1950–51) ===
No. overall	No. in season	Title	Directed by	Written by	Original release date
63	1	"Zone Four"	Franklin J. Schaffner	Adapted by : Worthington Miner; From a story by : Fielder Cook	August 28, 1950
64	2	"Look Homeward, Hayseed"	Paul Nickell	Adapted by : Elizabeth Hart & Worthington Miner; From a story by : John Ed Pierce	September 4, 1950
65	3	"Mist with the Tamara Geba"	John Peyser	Adapted by : Worthington Miner; From a story by : Rita Weiman	September 11, 1950
66	4	"Trilby"	Paul Nickell	Adapted by : Joseph Liss; From a story by : George L. Du Maurier	September 18, 1950
67	5	"Away from It All"	John Peyser	Adapted by : Worthington Miner; From a story by : Val Gielgud	September 25, 1950
68	6	"The Passionate Pilgrim"	Paul Nickell	Teleplay by : Sumner Locke Elliott; From a story by : Henry James & Charles Terrot	October 2, 1950
69	7	"Spectre of Alexander Wolff"	Carl Frank	Adapted by : Worthington Miner; From a story by : Gaito Gazdanov	October 9, 1950
70	8	"Good for Thirty Days"	Paul Nickell	Adapted by : Charles O'Neil; From a story by : Richard Stern	October 16, 1950
71	9	"The Road to Jericho"	Carl Frank	Adapted by : Loren Disney & Worthington Miner; From a story by : Elmer Davis	October 23, 1950
72	10	"Wuthering Heights"	Paul Nickell	Adapted by : Lois Jacoby; From a story by : Emily Brontë	October 30, 1950
73	11	"The Blonde Comes First"	Lela Swift	Adapted by : Worthington Miner; From a story by : Aben Kandel	November 6, 1950
.
74	12	"The Last Cruise"	Paul Nickell	Adapted by : Worthington Miner; From a story by : William J. Lederer	November 13, 1950
75	13	"The Floor of Heaven"	Lela Swift	Story by : Sylvia Chatfield Bates; Adapted by : Joseph Liss	November 20, 1950
76	14	"The Shadow of a Man"	Paul Nickell	Story by : May Sarton; Adapted by : Sumner Locke Elliott	November 27, 1950
77	15	"Letter from Cairo"	Lela Swift	Unknown	December 4, 1950
78	16	"Mary Lou"	Paul Nickell	Story by : Mildred Cramin; Adapted by : Catherine Turney	December 11, 1950
.
79	17	"Little Women: Meg's Story"	Paul Nickell	Adapted by : Sumner Locke Elliott; From the novel by : Louisa May Alcott	December 18, 1950
80	18	"Little Women: Jo's Story"	Lela Swift	Adapted by : Sumner Locke Elliott; From the novel by : Louisa May Alcott	December 25, 1950
81	19	"Collector's Item"	Leonard Valenta	Unknown	January 1, 1951
82	20	"England Made Me"	Lela Swift	Story by : Graham Greene	January 8, 1951
83	21	"Track of the Cat"	Ralph Nelson	Story by : Walter Van Tilburg Clark; Teleplay by : Betty Loring	January 15, 1951
84	22	"The Trial of John Peter Zenger"	Paul Nickell	Irve Tunick	January 22, 1951
85	23	"Public Servant"	Ralph Nelson	Hugh Pentecost	January 29, 1951
86	24	"The Target"	Unknown	Unknown	February 5, 1951
87	25	"None But My Foe"	Unknown	Adapted by : Worthington Miner	February 12, 1951
88	26	"The Way Things Are"	Unknown	Unknown	February 19, 1951
89	27	"The Ambassadors"	Franklin J. Schaffner	Adapted by : Lois Jacoby & Worthington Miner; From the novel by : Henry James	February 26, 1951
90	28	"One Pair of Hands"	Unknown	Unknown	March 5, 1951
91	29	"A Chill on the Wind"	Ralph Nelson	Adapted by : Edward Gibbons & Worthington Miner	March 12, 1951
92	30	"Hangman's House"	Paul Nickell	Teleplay by : Brian Oswald Donn-Byrne; Adapted by : Joseph Liss	March 19, 1951
93	31	"The Case of Karen Smith"	Lela Swift	Story by : Viola Brothers Shore; Adapted by : Mona Kent	March 26, 1951
94	32	"Wintertime"	Paul Nickell	Story by : Jan Valtin; Adapted by : Robert Anderson	April 2, 1951
95	33	"Shake the Stars Down"	Unknown	Unknown	April 9, 1951
96	34	"The Straight and Narrow"	Paul Nickell	Unknown	April 16, 1951
97	35	"The Happy Housewife"	Lela Swift	Teleplay by : Hedda Rosten	April 23, 1951
98	36	"Portrait by Rembrandt"	Paul Nickell	Irve Tunick	April 30, 1951
99	37	"No Tears for Hilda"	Lela Swift	Story by : Andrew Garve; Adapted by : David Swift	May 7, 1951
100	38	"The Old Foolishness"	Paul Nickell	Unknown	May 14, 1951
101	39	"A Chance for Happiness"	Unknown	Unknown	May 21, 1951
102	40	"Here Is My Life"	Paul Nickell	Unknown	May 28, 1951
103	41	"Shield for Murder"	Unknown	Story by : William P. McGivern; Teleplay by : Irve Tunick	June 4, 1951
104	42	"Coriolanus"	Paul Nickell	Based on a play by : William Shakespeare	June 11, 1951
105	43	"Screwball"	Unknown	Mel Goldberg	June 18, 1951
106	44	"Lonely Boy"	Unknown	Unknown	June 25, 1951
107	45	"The Swan"	Walter Hart	Based on a play by : Ferenc Molnár	July 2, 1951
108	46	"Nightfall"	John Peyser	Teleplay by : Max Ehrlich; From the novel by : David Goodis	July 9, 1951
109	47	"The Apple Tree"	Walter Hart	Story by : John Galsworthy; Teleplay by : David Shaw	July 16, 1951
110	48	"Tremolo"	Unknown	Mel Goldberg	July 23, 1951
111	49	"At Mrs. Beam's"	Walter Hart	Unknown	July 30, 1951
112	50	"The Pink Hussar"	Martin Magner	Story by : Ben Hecht; Teleplay by : Doris Frankel	August 6, 1951
113	51	"The Rabbit"	John Peyser	Story by : Morton Grant; Adapted by : Philo Higley	August 13, 1951
.
114	52	"Run from the Sun"	Unknown	Mel Goldberg & William Krasner	August 20, 1951
115	53	"Summer Had Better Be Good"	John Peyser	Story by : Ruth McKenney; Adapted by : Alvin Sapinsley	August 27, 1951
116	54	"Mr. Mummery's Suspicion"	Martin Magner	Teleplay by : Dorothy L. Sayers; Adapted by : Alvin Sapinsley	September 3, 1951
117	55	"The Guinea Pig"	Roy Fowler	Teleplay by : Dr. Theodore Bawer; Adapted by : Sam Locke	September 10, 1951

=== Season 4 (1951–52) ===
No. overall	No. in season	Title	Directed by	Written by	Original release date
118	1	"The Angelic Avengers"	Paul Nickell	Adapted by : Worthington Miner; From a Story by : Karen Blixen	September 17, 1951
119	2	"The Little Black Bag"	Franklin J. Schaffner	Adapted by : Lois Jacoby & Paul Peters; From a Story by : Samuel R. Golding	September 24, 1951
120	3	"The Idol of San Vittore"	Paul Nickell	Unknown	October 1, 1951
121	4	"Mighty Like a Rogue"	Franklin J. Schaffner	Adapted by : Lou Meltzer; From a Story by : Day Keene	October 8, 1951
122	5	"Colonel Judas"	Paul Nickell	Unknown	October 15, 1951
123	6	"Macbeth"	Franklin J. Schaffner	Teleplay by : Worthington Miner; Based on the play by : William Shakespeare	October 22, 1951
124	7	"They Serve the Muses"	Franklin J. Schaffner	Adapted by : Elizabeth Hart; From a Story by : Kressmann Taylor	October 29, 1951
125	8	"The Hero"	Franklin J. Schaffner	Irwin Lewis	November 5, 1951
126	9	"A Bolt of Lightning"	Paul Nickell	Irve Tunick	November 12, 1951
127	10	"The King in Yellow"	Franklin J. Schaffner	Story by : Raymond Chandler; Teleplay by : Betty Loring	November 19, 1951
128	11	"The Dangerous Years"	Paul Nickell	Unknown	November 26, 1951
129	12	"Mutiny on the Nicolette"	Franklin J. Schaffner	Adapted by : Joseph Liss; From a Story by : James Norman	December 3, 1951
130	13	"The Legend of Jenny Lind"	Paul Nickell	Irve Tunick	December 10, 1951
131	14	"The Innocence of Pastor Muller"	Franklin J. Schaffner	Adapted by : Worthington Miner; From a Story by : Carlo Beuf	December 17, 1951
132	15	"Sara Crewe"	Paul Nickell	Unknown	December 24, 1951
133	16	"The Paris Feeling"	Franklin J. Schaffner	Unknown	December 31, 1951
134	17	"The Devil in Velvet"	Paul Nickell	Adapted by : Sumner Locke Elliott; From a story by : John Dickson Carr	January 7, 1952
135	18	"Waterfront Boss"	Franklin J. Schaffner	Adapted by : Joseph Liss; From a Story by : Edward D. Radin	January 14, 1952
136	19	"The Other Father"	Paul Nickell	Unknown	January 21, 1952
137	20	"Burden of Guilt"	Franklin J. Schaffner	Adapted by : Worthington Miner; From a Story by : John Hawkins & Ward Hawkins	January 28, 1952
138	21	"A Candle for St. Jude"	Paul Nickell	Unknown	February 4, 1952
139	22	"Pagoda"	Franklin J. Schaffner	Adapted by : Joseph Liss; From a Story by : James Atlee Phillips	February 11, 1952
140	23	"Success Story"	Paul Nickell	Unknown	February 18, 1952
141	24	"Letter from an Unknown Woman"	Franklin J. Schaffner	Adapted by : Worthington Miner; From a Story by : Stefan Zweig	February 25, 1952
142	25	"Ten Thousand Horses Singing"	Paul Nickell	Adapted by : Worthington Miner; From a Story by : Robert Carson	March 3, 1952
143	26	"The Wings of the Dove"	Franklin J. Schaffner	Adapted by : Howard Merrill; From the novel by : Henry James	March 10, 1952
144	27	"The Vintage Years"	Paul Nickell	Unknown	March 17, 1952
145	28	"Miss Hargreaves"	Franklin J. Schaffner	Adapted by : Sumner Locke Elliott; From a story by : Frank Baker	March 24, 1952
146	29	"The Story of Meg Mallory"	Paul Nickell	Adapted by : Worthington Miner; From a Story by : William Dozier	March 31, 1952
147	30	"Pontius Pilate"	Franklin J. Schaffner	Adapted by : Worthington Miner; From a Story by : Michael Dyne	April 7, 1952
148	31	"Hold Back the Night"	Paul Nickell	Adapted by : Mel Goldberg; From a novel by : Pat Frank	April 14, 1952
149	32	"Lilly, the Queen of the Movies"	Franklin J. Schaffner	Adapted by : Alvin Sapinsley; From a Story by : Paul Gallico	April 21, 1952
150	33	"The Deep Dark"	Paul Nickell	Mel Goldberg	April 28, 1952
151	34	"Treasure Island"	Franklin J. Schaffner	Adapted by : Donald Davis; From a novel by : Robert Louis Stevenson	May 5, 1952
152	35	"They Came to Baghdad"	Paul Nickell	Story by : Agatha Christie	May 12, 1952
153	36	"A Connecticut Yankee in King Arthur's Court"	Franklin J. Schaffner	Adapted by : Alvin Sapinsley; From a Novel by : Samuel Clemens	May 19, 1952
154	37	"Abraham Lincoln"	Paul Nickell	Teleplay by : David Shaw; From a story by : John Drinkwater	May 26, 1952
155	38	"Captain-General of the Armies"	Franklin J. Schaffner	Adapted by : James Costigan; From a Story by : Robert Sherman Townes	June 2, 1952
156	39	"Lovers and Friends"	Paul Nickell	Unknown	June 9, 1952
157	40	"International Incident"	Franklin J. Schaffner	Adapted by : Whitfield Cook; From a Novel by : S.B. Hough	June 16, 1952
158	41	"There Was a Crooked Man"	Martin Magner	Unknown	June 23, 1952
159	42	"The Blonde Comes First"	Matt Harlib	Adapted by : Worthington Miner; From a story by : Aben Kandel	June 30, 1952
160	43	"The Rockingham Tea Set"	Lela Swift	Adapted by : Worthington Miner & Matt Harlib; From a story by : Virginia Douglas Dawson	July 14, 1952
161	44	"The Last Thing I Do"	Unknown	Unknown	July 28, 1952
162	45	"Jane Eyre"	Jack Gage	Adapted by : James P. Cavanagh; From a Novel by : Charlotte Brontë	August 4, 1952
163	46	"The Man They Acquitted"	Andrew McCullough	Teleplay by : Reginald Denham & Mary Orr	August 11, 1952
164	47	"One in a Million"	Unknown	Unknown	August 18, 1952
165	48	"The Good Companions"	Unknown	Story by : J.B. Priestley	August 25, 1952
166	49	"Stan, the Killer"	Paul Nickell	Story by : Georges Simenon; Teleplay by : Paul Monash	September 1, 1952
167	50	"The Happy Housewife"	David Lowell Rich	Unknown	September 8, 1952
168	51	"The Shadowy Third"	Unknown	Adapted by : Worthington Miner; From a Story by : Ellen Glasgow	September 15, 1952

=== Season 5 (1952–53) ===
No. overall	No. in season	Title	Directed by	Written by	Original release date
169	1	"The Kill"	Franklin J. Schaffner	Adapted by : Reginald Rose; From a novel by : Cameron Owen	September 22, 1952
170	2	"The Square Peg"	Paul Nickell	Adapted by : Alvin Sapinsley; From a Story by : George Malcolm-Smith	September 29, 1952
171	3	"The Doctor's Wife"	Franklin J. Schaffner	Adapted by : David Shaw; From a Story by : Nelia Gardner White	October 6, 1952
172	4	"Little Man, Big World"	Paul Nickell	Adapted by : Reginald Rose; From a story by : W.R. Burnett	October 13, 1952
173	5	"The Great Conspiracy"	Franklin J. Schaffner	Unknown	October 20, 1952
174	6	"The Love Letter"	Paul Nickell	Unknown	October 27, 1952
175	7	"The Incredible Mr. Glencannon"	Franklin J. Schaffner	Adapted by : Alvin Sapinsley; From a Story by : Guy Gilpatric	November 10, 1952
176	8	"Plan for Escape"	Paul Nickell	Adapted by : Sam Elkin & Raphael Hayes; From a Story by : Violet Wolfson	November 17, 1952
177	9	"The Formula"	Franklin J. Schaffner	Adapted by : Reginald Rose; From a story by : Gordon Sager	November 24, 1952
178	10	"I Am Jonathan Scrivener"	Paul Nickell	Unknown	December 1, 1952
179	11	"The Hospital"	Franklin J. Schaffner	Adapted by : A.J. Russell; From a story by : Kenneth Fearing	December 8, 1952
180	12	"The Great Lady"	Paul Nickell	Unknown	December 15, 1952
181	13	"The Play of the Nativity of the Child Jesus"	Franklin J. Schaffner	Unknown	December 22, 1952
182	14	"Young Man Adam"	Paul Nickell	Unknown	December 29, 1952
183	15	"Black Rain"	Franklin J. Schaffner	Adapted by : Gerald Savory; From a novel by : Georges Simenon	January 5, 1953
184	16	"The Trial of John Peter Zenger"	Paul Nickell	Teleplay by : Irve Tunick	January 12, 1953
185	17	"Signal Thirty-Two"	Franklin J. Schaffner	Adapted by : Stanley Niss; From a story by : MacKinlay Kantor	January 19, 1953
186	18	"To a Moment of Triumph"	Paul Nickell	Unknown	January 26, 1953
187	19	"Mark of Cain"	Franklin J. Schaffner	Teleplay by : Stanley Niss	February 2, 1953
188	20	"The River Garden"	Paul Nickell	Unknown	February 9, 1953
189	21	"The Walsh Girls"	Franklin J. Schaffner	Adapted by : A.J. Russell; From a story by : Elizabeth Janeway	February 16, 1953
190	22	"The Show Piece"	Paul Nickell	Unknown	February 23, 1953
191	23	"My Beloved Husband"	Franklin J. Schaffner	Adapted by : Robert Wallstens; From a story by : Philip Loraine	March 2, 1953
192	24	"The Garretson Chronicle"	Paul Nickell	Unknown	March 9, 1953
193	25	"A Breath of Air"	Franklin J. Schaffner	Unknown	March 16, 1953
194	26	"The Edge of Evil"	Paul Nickell	Adapted by : Don Mankiewicz	March 23, 1953
195	27	"At Midnight on the Thirty-first of March"	Franklin J. Schaffner	Unknown	March 30, 1953
196	28	"Shadow of the Devil"	Paul Nickell	Unknown	April 6, 1953
197	29	"The Magic Lantern"	Franklin J. Schaffner	Unknown	April 13, 1953
198	30	"The Fathers"	Paul Nickell	Teleplay by : Henry Kane	April 20, 1953
199	31	"Along Came a Spider"	Franklin J. Schaffner	Unknown	April 27, 1953
200	32	"Birthright"	Paul Nickell	Adapted by : Emerson Crocker; From a novel by : Claude Houghton	May 4, 1953
201	33	"King Coffin"	Franklin J. Schaffner	From a novel by : Conrad Aiken	May 11, 1953
202	34	"The Laugh Maker"	Paul Nickell	Teleplay by : A.J. Russell	May 18, 1953
203	35	"Fly with the Hawk"	Franklin J. Schaffner	Teleplay by : Stanley Niss	May 24, 1953
204	36	"Rendezvous"	Paul Nickell	Teleplay by : Robert Wallsten; Based on a play by : Vincent McConnor	June 1, 1953
205	37	"Conflict"	Franklin J. Schaffner	Teleplay by : A.J. Russell	June 8, 1953
206	38	"The Paris Feeling"	Matt Harlib	Unknown	June 22, 1953
207	39	"Greed"	Unknown	Unknown	June 29, 1953
208	40	"Beyond Reason"	Unknown	Unknown	July 6, 1953
209	41	"End of the Honeymoon"	Unknown	Teleplay by : Raphael Hayes; From a story by : Marie Belloc Lowndes	July 13, 1953
210	42	"The Shadow of a Man"	James Sheldon	Adapted by : Sumner Locke Elliott; From a novel by : May Sarton	July 20, 1953
211	43	"The King in Yellow"	James Sheldon	Teleplay by : Betty Loring; From a story by : Raymond Chandler	July 27, 1953
212	44	"The Roman Kid"	Judd Whiting	Teleplay by : Reginald Rose; From a story by : Paul Gallico	August 3, 1953
213	45	"Flowers from a Stranger"	Unknown	Unknown	August 10, 1953
A psychiatrist's wife battles her own deteriorating emotional state when she receives a box of flowers from a stranger.
214	46	"Sentence of Death"	Matt Harlib	Teleplay by : Adrian Spies; From a story by : Thomas Walsh	August 17, 1953
215	47	"The Gathering Night"	James Sheldon	Teleplay by : Raphael Hayes; From a story by : Rudyard Kipling	August 24, 1953
216	48	"Letter from Cairo"	Matt Harlib	Adapted by : Reginald Rose; From a story by : James Robbins Miller	August 31, 1953
217	49	"Look Homeward, Hayseed"	Unknown	Unknown	September 4, 1953
218	50	"The Storm"	Matt Harlib	Story by : MacIntoch Malmar; Adaptation : Worthington Miner	September 14, 1953
Guest stars: Martin E. Brooks, Betty Furness, and Laurence Hugo.

=== Season 6 (1953–54) ===
No. overall	No. in season	Title	Directed by	Written by	Original release date
219	1	"1984"	Paul Nickell	Written for television by : Worthington Miner; Novel : George Orwell	September 21, 1953
220	2	"Hound-Dog Man"	Franklin J. Schaffner	Teleplay by : Mel Goldberg; Novel : Fred Gipson	September 28, 1953
221	3	"Silent the Song"	Paul Nickell	Story by : Faith Baldwin; Teleplay by : Tad Mosel	October 5, 1953
222	4	"Music and Mrs. Pratt"	Franklin J. Schaffner	Written by : Harry W. Junkin	October 12, 1953
223	5	"Letter of Love"	Paul Nickell	Written by : Sylvia Berger	October 19, 1953
224	6	"Another Caesar"	Franklin J. Schaffner	Adaptation : Michael Dyne; Play : Rodolfo Usigli	October 26, 1953
225	7	"Crime at Blossom's"	Paul Nickell	Written by : Jerome Ross	November 2, 1953
226	8	"Camille"	Franklin J. Schaffner	Story by : Alexandre Dumas; Teleplay by : Thomas Phipps	November 9, 1953
227	9	"A Bargain with God"	Paul Nickell	Story by : Thomas Savage; Teleplay by : Howard Rodman	November 16, 1953
228	10	"Buffalo Bill Is Dead"	Franklin J. Schaffner	Writer : Rod Serling	November 23, 1953
229	11	"Confessions of a Nervous Man"	Paul Nickell	Writer : George Axelrod	November 30, 1953
230	12	"Dry Run"	Franklin J. Schaffner	Story by : Robert I. Olsen; Adaptation : David Shaw	December 7, 1953
231	13	"All My Love"	Paul Nickell	Writer : Mel Goldberg	December 14, 1953
232	14	"Cinderella '53"	Franklin J. Schaffner	Teleplay by : Arnold Schulman	December 21, 1953
233	15	"Master of the Rose"	Paul Nickell	Written by : Michael Dyne	December 28, 1953
234	16	"The Runaway"	Franklin J. Schaffner	Written by : A.J. Russell	January 4, 1954
235	17	"The Remarkable Incident at Carson Corners"	Paul Nickell	Writer : Reginald Rose	January 11, 1954
School children turn classroom into courtroom, putting adults on trial. Guest Stars: Harry Townes, John C. Becher, Doreen Lang, Priscilla Gillette, Hugh Reilly, Frances Fuller, Sarah Seeger, Robert P. Lieb, John Shellie, Lois Holmes, O. Z. Whitehead, Ruth White, Frank Overton, Stefan Olsen, Jane Alexander, Glen Walken, Pud Flanagan, Charles Taylor, Stanley Martin, Susan Halloran, John Connaughton, and Jack Ragotzy
236	18	"A Criminal Design"	Franklin J. Schaffner	Story by : William Jerome Fay (story "Murder in the Backroom"); Teleplay by : A.J. Russell	January 18, 1954
237	19	"A Favor for a Friend"	Paul Nickell	Unknown	January 25, 1954
238	20	"Herman, Come by Bomber"	Franklin J. Schaffner	Unknown	February 1, 1954
239	21	"Man of Extinction"	Paul Nickell	Unknown	February 8, 1954
240	22	"Dark Possession"	Franklin J. Schaffner	Unknown	February 15, 1954
241	23	"The Role of a Lover"	Paul Nickell	Unknown	February 22, 1954
242	24	"Side Street"	Franklin J. Schaffner	Unknown	March 1, 1954
243	25	"Beyond a Reasonable Doubt"	Paul Nickell	Unknown	March 8, 1954
244	26	"Thunder on Sycamore Street"	Franklin J. Schaffner	Unknown	March 15, 1954
Guest Stars: Whitfield Connor, Nell O'Day, Robert Bussard, Dickie Olsen, Lee Bergere, Anna Cameron, Harry Sheppard, Kenneth Utt, Charlotte Pearson, Tirrell Barbery, Judith Lowry, Charles Penman, and Mabel Cochran
245	27	"The Expendables"	Paul Nickell	Unknown	March 22, 1954
246	28	"Paul's Apartment"	Franklin J. Schaffner	Unknown	March 29, 1954
247	29	"Stir Mugs"	Paul Nickell	Unknown	April 5, 1954
248	30	"Jack Sperling, Forty-six"	Franklin J. Schaffner	Unknown	April 12, 1954
249	31	"A Handful of Diamonds"	Paul Nickell	Unknown	April 19, 1954
250	32	"Romney"	Franklin J. Schaffner	Unknown	April 26, 1954
251	33	"Cardinal Mindszenty"	Paul Nickell	Unknown	May 3, 1954
252	34	"Fear Is No Stranger"	Franklin J. Schaffner	Unknown	May 10, 1954
253	35	"Castle in Spain"	Paul Nickell	Unknown	May 17, 1954
254	36	"A Man and Two Gods"	Franklin J. Schaffner	Unknown	May 24, 1954
255	37	"The Life and Death of Larry Benson"	Paul Nickell	Unknown	May 31, 1954
256	38	"The Strike"	Franklin J. Schaffner	Unknown	June 7, 1954
257	39	"A Letter to Mr. Gubbins"	Paul Nickell	Unknown	June 14, 1954
258	40	"Fandango at War Bonnet"	Allen Reisner	Unknown	June 21, 1954
259	41	"Screwball"	Byron Kelly	Unknown	June 28, 1954
260	42	"The Small Door"	Mel Ferber	Unknown	July 5, 1954
261	43	"A Guest at the Embassy"	Allen Reisner	Unknown	July 12, 1954
262	44	"Home Again, Home Again"	Allen Reisner	Unknown	July 19, 1954
263	45	"The Hero"	George Gould	Edgar Marvin	July 26, 1954
264	46	"The Magic Monday"	Allen Reisner	Harry W. Junkin	August 2, 1954
265	47	"Sue Ellen"	Mel Ferber	Carey Wilber	August 9, 1954
266	48	"The House of Gair"	Allen Reisner	Michael Dyne, Eric Linklater	August 16, 1954
267	49	"Experiment Perilous"	Mel Ferber	Mel Goldberg	August 23, 1954
268	50	"The Secret Self"	Allen Reisner	Michael Dyne	August 30, 1954
269	51	"U.F.O."	Mel Ferber	Rod Serling	September 6, 1954
270	52	"The Cliff"	Allen Reisner	Michael Dyne	September 13, 1954
Guest stars: Martin E. Brooks, Marjorie Eaton, and Betty Furness.

=== Season 7 (1954–55) ===
No. overall	No. in season	Title	Directed by	Written by	Original release date
271	1	"Twelve Angry Men"	Franklin J. Schaffner	Reginald Rose	September 20, 1954
272	2	"The Education of H*Y*M*A*N K*A*P*L*A*N"	Paul Nickell	Fletcher Markle, Howard Rodman, Leonard Q. Ross	September 27, 1954
273	3	"Prelude to Murder"	Franklin J. Schaffner	Walter C. Brown, Fletcher Markle, William Templeton	October 4, 1954
274	4	"Melissa"	Paul Nickell	Taylor Caldwell, Don Ettlinger, Fletcher Markle	October 11, 1954
275	5	"The Boy Who Changed the World"	Franklin J. Schaffner	Fletcher Markle, Joseph Schrank	October 18, 1954
276	6	"Fatal in My Fashion"	Paul Nickell	Fletcher Markle, A.J. Russell	October 25, 1954
277	7	"The Man Who Owned the Town"	Franklin J. Schaffner	David P. Harmon, Fletcher Markle	November 1, 1954
278	8	"An Almanac of Liberty"	Paul Nickell	William O. Douglass, Fletcher Markle, Reginald Rose	November 8, 1954
279	9	"Let Me Go, Lover"	Franklin J. Schaffner	Charlotte Armstrong, Fletcher Markle, Henry Misrock	November 15, 1954
280	10	"Joey"	Paul Nickell	Fletcher Markle, H. Philip Minis, A.J. Russell	November 22, 1954
281	11	"The Deserter"	Franklin J. Schaffner	Lowell Barrington, Fletcher Markle, S. Lee Pogostin	November 29, 1954
282	12	"Short Cut"	Paul Nickell	Fletcher Markle, Carey Wilber	December 6, 1954
283	13	"12:32 A.M."	Franklin J. Schaffner	Fletcher Markle, Reginald Rose	December 13, 1954
284	14	"Two Little Minks"	Paul Nickell	Michael Dyne, Fletcher Markle, Lisa Osten	December 20, 1954
285	15	"The Cuckoo in Spring"	Franklin J. Schaffner	Elizabeth Cadell, Sam Hall, Fletcher Markle	December 27, 1954
286	16	"The Missing Men"	Paul Nickell	Marc Brandel, Walt Grove, Fletcher Markle	January 3, 1955
287	17	"Grandma Rolled Her Own"	Franklin J. Schaffner	Harry W. Junkin, Fletcher Markle, Ted Peckham	January 10, 1955
288	18	"Sail with the Tide"	Paul Nickell	Michael Dyne, Fletcher Markle	January 17, 1955
289	19	"It Might Happen Tomorrow"	Franklin J. Schaffner	Fletcher Markle, Carey Wilber	January 24, 1955
290	20	"The Silent Woman"	Paul Nickell	Marc Brandell, Margaret Page Hood, Fletcher Markle	January 31, 1955
291	21	"A Stranger May Die"	Franklin J. Schaffner	David P. Harmon, Fletcher Markle	February 7, 1955
292	22	"The Broken Spur"	Paul Nickell	Fletcher Markle, Reginald Rose	February 14, 1955
293	23	"The Eddie Chapman Story"	Franklin J. Schaffner	Fletcher Markle, Frank Owen, William Templeton	February 21, 1955
294	24	"Donovan's Brain"	William H. Brown Jr.	William Templeton	February 28, 1955
An experimental procedure—developed for the purpose of salvaging the living brains of newly expired subjects (and heretofore attempted only on monkeys)—is performed on a mortally injured millionaire with unforeseen and dire consequences. Guest Stars: Wendell Corey, E. G. Marshall, June Dayton, Don Hanmer, Lawrence Fletcher, John Reese, Patsy Bruder, Charles Penman, and Stanja Lowe.
295	25	"Millions of Georges"	Unknown	Unknown	March 7, 1955
296	26	"The Conviction of Peter Shea"	Unknown	Unknown	March 14, 1955
297	27	"Miss Turner's Decision"	Unknown	Unknown	March 21, 1955
298	28	"Dominique"	Unknown	Unknown	March 21, 1955
299	29	"Cross My Heart"	Unknown	Unknown	April 4, 1955
300	30	"Passage at Arms"	Unknown	Unknown	April 11, 1955
301	31	"Affairs of State"	Unknown	Unknown	April 18, 1955
302	32	"Mrs. Brimmer Did It!"	Unknown	Unknown	April 25, 1954
303	33	"Summer Pavilion"	Unknown	Unknown	May 2, 1955
304	34	"A Picture in the Paper"	Unknown	Unknown	May 9, 1955
305	35	"Strange Companion"	Unknown	Unknown	May 16, 1955
306	36	"Pigeons and People"	Unknown	Unknown	May 23, 1955
307	37	"Operation Home"	Unknown	Unknown	May 30, 1955
308	38	"The Spongers"	Unknown	Unknown	June 6, 1955
309	39	"The Incredible World of Horace Ford"	Felix Jackson	Reginald Rose	June 13, 1955
This is the story—later reworked, with happy ending added for The Twilight Zone—of a 30-something toy manufacturer who wanders into his old neighborhood only to find everything exactly as it was—and everyone exactly the age they were—25 years before. Guest Stars (as credited, in order of appearance): Art Carney, Leora Dana, Jason Robards Jr. (as Jason Robards), House Jameson, Joseph Leberman, Tom Troupe, Carolyn King, Bruce Marshall, Billy Harris, Tommy White, Joey Fallon, Kenneth Sharpe, Buzzy Martin, Bettye Ackerman, Raymond Duke
310	40	"Heart Song"	Unknown	Unknown	June 20, 1955
311	41	"For the Defense"	Unknown	Unknown	June 27, 1955
312	42	"The Day Before the Wedding"	Unknown	Unknown	July 4, 1955
313	43	"Sane as a Hatter"	Unknown	Unknown	July 11, 1955
314	44	"A Terrible Day"	Seymour Robbie	Carey Wilber	July 18, 1955
Guest stars: Jack Klugman, Royal Beal, Bruce Gordon and Arthur O'Connell.
315	45	"The Tall Dark Stranger"	Unknown	Unknown	July 25, 1955
316	46	"Julius Caesar"	Unknown	Unknown	August 1, 1955
317	47	"The Prince and the Puppet"	Unknown	Unknown	August 8, 1955
318	48	"The Secret"	Unknown	Unknown	August 15, 1955
319	49	"The Voysey Inheritance"	Unknown	Unknown	August 22, 1955
320	50	"A Chance at Love"	Unknown	Unknown	August 29, 1955
321	51	"Mama's Boy"	Tom Donovan	Mel Goldberg	September 5, 1955
Guest stars: Martin E. Brooks, Betty Furness, and Alfred Ryder.
322	52	"The Pit"	Unknown	Unknown	September 12, 1955

=== Season 8 (1955–56) ===
No. overall	No. in season	Title	Directed by	Written by	Original release date
323	1	"Like Father, Like Son"	Paul Nickell	Robert Howard Lindsay & Kathleen Lindsey	September 19, 1955
324	2	"Three Empty Rooms"	Franklin Schaffner	Reginald Rose	September 26, 1955
325	3	TBA	TBA	TBA	TBA
326	4	"Uncle Ed And Circumstance"	Paul Nickell	Unknown	October 10, 1955
327	5	TBA	TBA	TBA	TBA
328	6	TBA	TBA	TBA	TBA
329	7	TBA	TBA	TBA	TBA
330	8	"Shakedown Cruise"	Franklin J. Schaffner	Loring Mandel	November 7, 1955
A Navy crew must organize themselves before the crippled submarine sits on the ocean floor. Guest stars: Martin E. Brooks, Betty Furness, and Don Hastings.
331	9	"The Judge and His Hangman"	William H. Brown Jr.	Dick Berg	November 14, 1955
In Bern, Switzerland, the seemingly lackadaisical chief of police announces that the mystery surrounding a fellow officer's death has been solved. Exactly how this solution was reached is revealed through a series of flashbacks. Guest stars: Kurt Kasznar, Charles Korvin, Herbert Berghof, Jamie Smith, George Voskovec, and Luis van Rooten.
332	10	"Of Human Bondage"	Paul Nickell	W. Somerset Maugham	November 21, 1955
333	11	"The Man Who Caught The Ball At Coogan's Bluff"	Franklin Schaffner	Rod Serling	November 28, 1955
334	12	TBA	TBA	TBA	TBA
335	13	TBA	TBA	TBA	TBA
336	14	"Miracle At Potter's Farm"	Franklin Schaffner	Kathleen Lindsay; Robert Howard Lindsay	December 19, 1955
337	15	"Fair Play"	William H. Brown	Unknown	December 26, 1955
338	16	"Dino"	Paul Nickell	Reginald Rose	January 2, 1956
339	17	TBA	TBA	TBA	TBA
340	18	TBA	TBA	TBA	TBA
341	19	TBA	TBA	TBA	TBA
342	20	TBA	TBA	TBA	TBA
343	21	TBA	TBA	TBA	TBA
344	22	TBA	TBA	TBA	TBA
345	23	TBA	TBA	TBA	TBA
346	24	TBA	TBA	TBA	TBA
347	25	TBA	TBA	TBA	TBA
348	26	TBA	TBA	TBA	TBA
349	27	TBA	TBA	TBA	TBA
350	28	"This Will Do Nicely"	William H. Brown	Loring D. Mandel	April 2, 1956
351	29	"The Arena"	Franklin J. Schaffner	Rod Serling	April 9, 1956
A newly appointed junior senator defends his father, a former senator voted out of office, from accusations by a senior senator. When the junior senator learns of evidence to ruin the senior senator's reputation, he faces a dilemma as to whether to divulge the evidence. Guest stars : Wendell Corey, Chester Morris, Leora Dana and Frances Sternhagen.
352	30	TBA	TBA	TBA	TBA
353	31	TBA	TBA	TBA	TBA
354	32	TBA	TBA	TBA	TBA
355	33	"The Drop of a Hat"	Franklin J. Schaffner	Richard Berg	May 7, 1956
Guest stars: Valerie Bettis, Jayne Meadows, Elizabeth Montgomery, Nina Foch, and George Voskovec.
356	34	TBA	TBA	TBA	TBA
357	35	TBA	TBA	TBA	TBA
358	36	TBA	TBA	TBA	TBA
359	37	"The Power"	William H. Brown Jr.	Unknown	June 4, 1956
An adaptation of Frank M. Robinson's novel The Power.
360	38	TBA	TBA	TBA	TBA
361	39	TBA	TBA	TBA	TBA
362	40	TBA	TBA	TBA	TBA
363	41	TBA	TBA	TBA	TBA
364	42	TBA	TBA	TBA	TBA
365	43	TBA	TBA	TBA	TBA
366	44	TBA	TBA	TBA	TBA
367	45	TBA	TBA	TBA	TBA
368	46	TBA	TBA	TBA	TBA
369	47	TBA	TBA	TBA	TBA
370	48	TBA	TBA	TBA	TBA
371	49	TBA	TBA	TBA	TBA
372	50	TBA	TBD	TBD	1956

=== Season 9 (1956–57) ===
No. overall	No. in season	Title	Directed by	Written by	Original release date
373	1	TBA	TBD	TBD	1956
374	2	TBA	TBA	TBA	TBA
375	3	TBA	TBA	TBA	TBA
376	4	TBA	TBA	TBA	TBA
377	5	TBA	TBA	TBA	TBA
378	6	TBA	TBA	TBA	TBA
379	7	TBA	TBA	TBA	TBA
380	8	TBA	TBA	TBA	TBA
381	9	TBA	TBA	TBA	TBA
382	10	TBA	TBA	TBA	TBA
383	11	TBA	TBA	TBA	TBA
384	12	TBA	TBA	TBA	TBA
385	13	TBA	TBA	TBA	TBA
386	14	TBA	TBA	TBA	TBA
387	15	"The Five Dollar Bill"	Unknown	Unknown	January 21, 1957
388	16	TBA	TBA	TBA	TBA
389	17	TBA	TBA	TBA	TBA
390	18	TBA	TBA	TBA	TBA
391	19	"The Hollywood Complex"	Norman Felton	John Vlahos	February 18, 1957
392	20	"The Defender: Part 1"	Robert Mulligan	Reginald Rose	February 25, 1957
393	21	"The Defender: Part 2"	Robert Mulligan	Reginald Rose	March 4, 1957
394	22	"A Child Is Waiting"	Vincent J. Donehue	Abby Mann	March 11, 1957
395	23	TBA	TBA	TBA	TBA
396	24	"A Member Of The Family"	Unknown	Unknown	March 25, 1957
397	25	"The Years In Between"	Alan Schneider; Mel Ferber	Will Schneider; Herman Goldberg	April 1, 1957
398	26	"The Playwright And The Star"	Norman Felton	Sidney Carroll	April 8, 1957
399	27	"The Rice Sprout Song"	Sidney Lumet	Loring Mandel	April 15, 1957
400	28	"The Travelling Lady"	Robert Mulligan	Horton Foote	April 22, 1957
401	29	TBA	TBA	TBA	TBA
402	30	"The Out-Of-Towners"	Jack Smight	Tad Mosel	May 6, 1957
403	31	"Babe In The Woods"	Tom Donovan	Sumner Locke Elliott	May 13, 1957
404	32	TBA	TBA	TBA	TBA
405	33	TBA	TBA	TBA	TBA
406	34	TBA	TBA	TBA	TBA
407	35	TBA	TBA	TBA	TBA
408	36	TBA	TBA	TBA	TBA
409	37	TBA	TBA	TBA	TBA
410	38	TBA	TBA	TBA	TBA
411	39	TBA	TBA	TBA	TBA
412	40	TBA	TBA	TBA	TBA
413	41	TBA	TBA	TBA	TBA
414	42	TBA	TBA	TBA	TBA
415	43	TBA	TBA	TBA	TBA
416	44	TBA	TBA	TBA	TBA
417	45	TBA	TBA	TBA	TBA
418	46	TBA	TBA	TBA	TBA
419	47	TBA	TBD	TBD	1957

=== Season 10 (1957–58) ===
No. overall	No. in season	Title	Directed by	Written by	Original release date
420	1	"The Night America Trembled"	Tom Donovan	Nelson Bond	September 9, 1957
421	2	"First Prize for Murder"	Louis G. Cowan	Story by : John D. MacDonald; Teleplay by : Phil Reisman Jr.	September 16, 1957
422	3	"Mutiny on the Shark Part 1"	Tom Donovan	Max Ehrlich	September 23, 1957
423	4	"Mutiny on the Shark Part 2"	Tom Donovan	Max Ehrlich	September 30, 1957
424	5	"The Morning Face"	Unknown	Tad Mosel	October 7, 1957
425	6	"Act of Mercy"	Tom Donovan	Jerome Ross	October 14, 1957
426	7	"The Deaf Heart"	Sidney Lumet	Mayo Simon	October 21, 1957
427	8	"The Bend in the Road"	Fielder Cook	John Vlahos	November 4, 1957
428	9	"Twenty-Four Hours Til Dawn"	David Greene	Patrick Alexander	November 11, 1957
429	10	"Please Report Any Odd Character"	Norman Felton	Jerome Ross	November 18, 1957
430	11	"Escape Route"	Fielder Cook	William Mourne	December 2, 1957
431	12	"No Deadly Medicine Part 1"	Unknown	Arthur Hailey	December 9, 1957
432	13	"No Deadly Medicine Part 2"	Unknown	Arthur Hailey	December 15, 1957
433	14	"The Brotherhood of the Bell"	Tom Donovan	Story by : David Karp; Teleplay by : Dale Wasserman	January 6, 1958
434	15	"The Other Place"	Jack Smight	Story by : J.B. Priestley; Teleplay by : Theodore Apstein	January 13, 1958
435	16	"Trail by Slander"	Tom Donovan	Roger O. Hirson	January 20, 1958
436	17	"Balance of Terror"	Jack Smight	Story by : Peter Shaffner; Teleplay by : Max Ehrlich	January 27, 1958
437	18	"The Laughing Willow"	Tom Donovan	Sumner Locke Elliott	February 3, 1958
438	19	"Presence of the Enemy"	Jack Smight	Tad Mosel	February 10, 1958
439	20	"Tide of Corruption"	Allen Reisner	Marc Brandel	February 17, 1958
440	21	"The Lonely Stage"	Tom Donovan	Robert Dozier	February 24, 1958
441	22	"The Fair-Haired Boy"	David Greene	Herman Raucher	March 3, 1958
442	23	"A Dead Ringer"	Robert Stevens	James Hadley Chase, Henry Misrock, Madeline Misrock	March 10, 1958
443	24	"Tongues of Angels"	Herbert Hirschman	John Vlahos	March 17, 1958
444	25	"The Award Winner"	David Greene	Jerry Davis & Tom August	March 24, 1958
445	26	"The Shadow of a Genius"	Ralph Nelson	Jerome Ross	March 31, 1958
446	27	"Mrs. 'Arris Goes to Paris"	David Greene	Story by : Paul Gallico; Teleplay by : Michael Dyne	April 14, 1958
447	28	"The Desperate Age"	Herbert Hirschman	Abby Mann	April 21, 1958
448	29	"The Edge of Truth"	David Greene	Adrian Spies	April 28, 1958
449	30	"The Mctaggert Succession"	Ted Post	John McGreevey	May 5, 1958
450	31	"Kurishiki Incident"	Tom Donovan	Roger O. Hirson	May 12, 1958
451	32	"A Funny-Looking Kid"	Ralph Nelson	Ben Starr	May 19, 1958
452	33	"The Enemy Within"	Herbert Hirschman	Richard DeRoy	May 26, 1958
453	34	"Ticket to Tahiti"	David Greene	Robert Bassing	June 2, 1958
Bill Gibson (Franchot Tone), Jim Gibson (James MacArthur), Maggie Church (Kim Hunter), Shirley Gibson (Olive Sturgess).
454	35	"The Strong Man"	Lamont Johnson	Harold Jack Bloom	June 9, 1958
455	36	"The Left-Handed Welcome"	Ron Winston	Story by : John D. Weaver; Teleplay by : Robert Presnell Jr.	June 16, 1958
456	37	"The Man Who Asked for a Funeral"	Tom Donovan	Jerome Ross	June 23, 1958
457	38	"The Undiscovered"	James Clark	Joseph Landon	June 30, 1958
458	39	"Man Under Glass"	Ron Winston	Richard Berg	July 14, 1958
Starring Albert Salmi (Lenny Shank), Jason Robards Sr. (Walter Osgood), Patrick Macnee (Bill Cheever). Includes young Michael Landon (Augie Barone).
459	40	"A Delicate Affair"	Paul Nickell	Jerome Gruskin	July 28, 1958
460	41	"The Last Summer"	John Frankenheimer	Frank D. Gilroy	August 4, 1958
461	42	"Tag-Along"	Jim Clark	Story by : Talmadge Oliver Bartley; Teleplay by : Ernest Kinoy	August 11, 1958
462	43	"Birthday Present"	Don Taylor	Jack Roche	August 18, 1958
463	44	"Bellingham"	Russell Stoneham	Story by : Elliott West; Teleplay by : A.J. Carothers & Elliott West	August 25, 1958
464	45	"The Lady Died at Midnight"	Paul Nickell	Charles Larson	September 1, 1958
465	46	"Music U.S.A."	Norman Abbott	Cy Howard	September 9, 1958
466	47	"No Place to Run"	James Clark	Story by : Nathaniel Benchley; Teleplay by : James P. Cavanagh	September 15, 1958
467	48	"Image of Fear"	Buzz Kulik	Story by : Leslie Stevens; Teleplay by : James P. Cavanagh	September 29, 1958
