= 1984 (Studio One) =

- Westinghouse Studio One episode
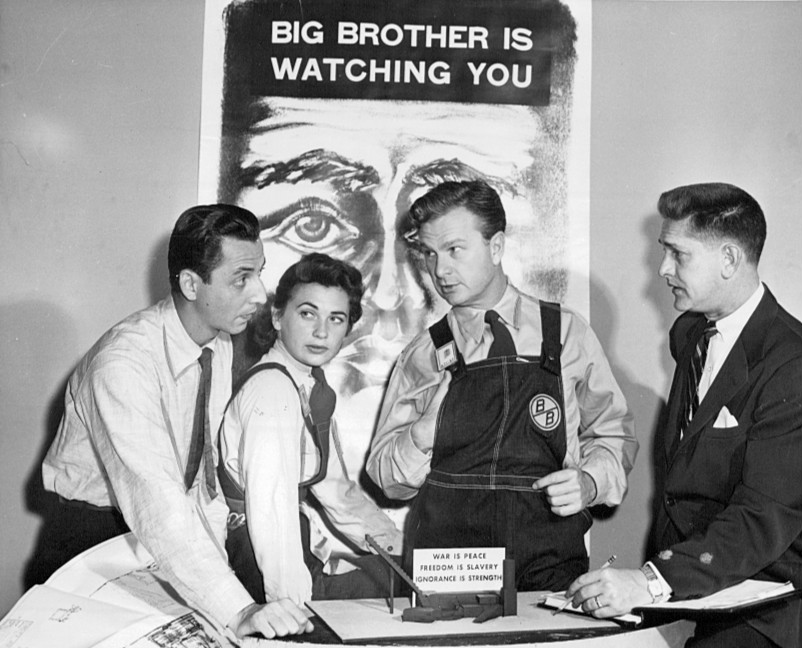
- On the set of the CBS anthology TV series Westinghouse Studio One's production of 1984. L-R: scenic designer Kim Swados, Norma Crane, Eddie Albert, and director Paul Nickell.
- Episode no.: Season 6 Episode 1
- Directed by: Paul Nickell
- Written by: William Templeton
- Original air date: September 21, 1953

Guest appearances
- Eddie Albert - Winston; Norma Crane - Julia; Lorne Greene - O'Brien

Episode chronology
← Previous "The Storm"	Next → "Hound-Dog Man"

"1984" is an episode of the American television series Westinghouse Studio One broadcast September 21, 1953, on CBS. Starring Eddie Albert, Norma Crane and Lorne Greene, it was the first adaptation of George Orwell's 1949 novel Nineteen Eighty-Four.

== Production and transmission ==
The adaptation was written by William Templeton, directed by Paul Nickell, and produced by Felix Jackson for the CBS Westinghouse Studio One series. Music was by Alfredo Antonini and the title drawing was by Dong Kingman. Broadcast on September 21, 1953, it was the first screen adaptation of the novel. Running to just under 50 minutes, it is a much-shortened version of the novel's narrative, with some changes, such as the character of Emmanuel Goldstein being changed to "Cassandra". Templeton co-wrote the 1956 film version, in which the character was similarly renamed as "Cellador". An uncredited Martin Landau is very briefly glimpsed in one scene.

== Cast ==
- Eddie Albert as Winston
- Norma Crane as Julia
- Lorne Greene as O'Brien
- Noel Leslie as Charrington
- Truman Smith as Parsons
- Midge Donaldson as Female Telescreen Voice
- Robert M. Culp as Male Telescreen Voice
- Victor Thorley as Cassandra
- Peter A. Ostroff as Syme
- Janice Mars as Singer
- Susan Hallaran as Selina
- Fred Scollay as Man in Cell
- Vincent Vanlynn as Prison Officer
- Don Hollenbeck as Narrator
- Betty Furness as Commercial spokeswoman

== DVD release ==
In 2008, Koch Vision released the Studio One Anthology, containing "1984" and 16 other episodes from the series, as well as an interview with director Paul Nickell.
