= A Bolt of Lightning =

- Studio One episode
- Episode no.: Season 4 Episode 9
- Directed by: Paul Nickell
- Written by: Irve Tunick
- Original air date: November 12, 1951
- Running time: 60 minutes

Guest appearances
- Charlton Heston as James Otis Jr.; Romney Brent as Governor Bernard; Anne Seymour as Mercy Warren; Harry Townes as Samuel Adams

Episode chronology
← Previous "The Hero"	Next → "The King in Yellow"

"A Bolt of Lightning" was an American television play broadcast on November 12, 1951, as part of the CBS television series, Studio One. It was a historical drama portraying James Otis Jr. (1725–1783) and his 1761 prosecution of the Paxton's case, contesting Britain's use of writs of assistance to conduct warrantless searches of the colonists' property. Charlton Heston, at age 28, starred as Otis.

The running time was 60 minutes including breaks hosted by Betty Furness, promoting Westinghouse refrigerators, electric roaster ovens, food crafters, and "odor-out" bulbs.

== Plot ==
=== Part 1 ===
In the opening scene, Otis leaves his law office in the evening. He passes Robinson, the crown's customs collector. Robinson and two others enter the home of John Emory. Robinson searches Emory's house for papers concerning contraband cargo of molasses and rum allegedly transported by ship to Boston. The search is conducted without a search warrant but rather on the basis of a writ of assistance, a legal process that had been declared illegal by the English courts. Robinson's men proceed to ransack Emory's house.

At a public house, Samuel Adams recounts the colonists' grievances against the crown. Emory arrives and tells Adams what has happened at his house. Adams and Emory visit Otis's house. They tell Otis what happened and ask for Otis's assistance in voiding writs of assistance. Otis initially demurs, noting that as advocate general it is his duty to defend the writs. Adams appeals to Otis's conscience to stand up to the viciousness of Robinson and Governor Bernard. Otis agrees to speak to the Governor.

A second merchant appeals to Otis to represent him in challenging the writs of assistance. Otis's sister, Mercy Warren, overhears the merchant's appeal and urges Otis to side with the people of Boston. Otis worries that standing against the Governor will damage his career.

At a party attended by the Governor, Otis is asked about rumors that he intends to represent a group of merchants in challenging the legality of writs of assistance. Otis says he has been approached and that he is considering the matter. Otis asks the Governor to consider voluntarily abandoning the writs. The Governor orders Otis that, as advocate general, he must defend the writs in Court. Otis refuses to defend an illegal act and resigns his post.

Part one closes with Otis at home after the party. He watches a lightning storm with his daughter, Mary, and says, "I've always had a curious feeling that, when God almighty in his providence should take me from time into eternity, it should be by a bolt of lightning."

=== Part 2 ===
Otis asks Sam Adams to review the speech that he will deliver in court the next day, attacking the writs of assistance. Otis's wife scolds Adams for destroying Otis's career and putting the family at risk. Otis explains that he must speak up for the right of men to be secure in the privacy of their homes. Otis worries that, no matter how persuasive he may be, Judge Hutchinson will not listen. Adams expects Otis to lose and opines that war will ultimately be needed. Otis still hopes the dispute can be settled through the courts.

Otis rehearses the speech for his daughter, Mary. The rehearsal fades out, and Otis is delivering his speech before Judge Hutchinson. Otis argues that the writs annihilate the sacred human right of a man to be secure in his house. He argues that a man is sovereign in his own house and that his rights there are inalienable. And if upheld, Otis urges that the people will resist.

In a gathering of Otis's wife and daughter following the speech, Mary defends her father. Otis's wife and their older daughter feel ashamed that Otis has disgraced the family.

The Governor meets with Robinson and asks Robinson to show Otis and the other trouble-makers the error of their ways.

Sam Adams informs Otis that his speech is being printed and distributed throughout the colonies where its message will be like a lightning bolt. After hearing the speech in court, John Adams is introduced to Otis and congratulates him for the speech. Robinson enters the pub and confronts Otis. One of Robinson's men hits Otis in the head with a club. Otis sustains a brain injury, and the doctor tells the family that he will require constant care for a long time.

=== Part 3 ===
Years have passed, and Otis's sister, now a spy for the patriots, visits Otis's home. She is told that Otis's mind is almost completely gone. He came out from the shadows briefly but the shadows have returned.

The Battle of Bunker Hill is fought. Otis hears the battle and is pleased that the people are resisting. He insists he is not too sick to join the fight. He joins the patriots in the battle.

Otis returns home after the battle. He describes the battle as "a fine beginning, a fine first page". Six more years pass, and in the closing scene, Otis learns of the peace treaty. Otis again looks into the lightning and asks, "What is lightning but a bond of fire binding heaven to earth?" A bolt of lightning then strikes him down.

== Cast ==
The cast credits at the end of the production were as follows:

- Charlton Heston as James Otis Jr.
- Romney Brent as Governor Bernard
- Rita Vale as Ruth Otis
- Elizabeth Johnson as Mary Otis
- Anne Seymour as Mercy Otis Warren (Otis's sister)
- Harry Townes as Samuel Adams
- Frank Overton as John Emory
- Ballad sung by Martin Newman.
- Rudolph Justice Watson
- Harry M. Cooke
- George Ives
- Roy Johnson
- Rita Morley
- Marvyn Dorkin
- Lloyd Bochner
- Shirley Ballard
- Jon Lormer
- Robert Baines

== Production ==
The episode was produced by Worthington Miner, directed by Paul Nickell, and written by Irve Tunick. It was broadcast on November 12, 1951, as part of the CBS television series, Westinghouse Studio One. It was the 100th episode of Studio One

In February 1952, Studio One won the award for Best Dramatic Show at the 4th Primetime Emmy Awards. Heston was also nominated for the Emmy for Best Actor.
