= The Dybbuk (Studio One) =

- Studio One episode
- Episode no.: Season 1 Episode 16
- Directed by: Paul Nickell
- Written by: Sholom Ansky (play); Joseph Liss (writer)
- Original air date: June 1, 1949
- Running time: 48 minutes

Episode chronology
← Previous "Flowers from a Stranger"	Next → "Boy Meets Girl"

"The Dybbuk" is a 1949 television production of the Russian play The Dybbuk by Sholom Ansky, a work authored between 1913 and 1914, which, as late as 2015, was dubbed by Cambridge University Press, "probably the most performed of any Yiddish play". Directed by Paul Nickell for Studio One from an English-language television adaptation by Joseph Liss (which would later form the basis for the like-named Play of the Week episode, directed by Sidney Lumet), The Dybbuk aired on June 1, 1949, and starred Arnold Moss, Mary Sinclair, and James Lanphier.

== Plot ==
No copy of this production is currently known to exist, so any plot description offered would be impossible to vouch for, the sole exception being this short summary, as featured in Variety's original review of the Studio One adaptation.

Ansky's classic tells of a brilliant scholar who dies for the love of a girl on the eve of her wedding to another. Unable to roam eternity, he invades the body of the girl, and is ultimately exorcised. Immediately afterward, the girl joins him in death.

== Cast ==
- Arnold Moss as Rabbi Azrael
- Mary Sinclair as Leah
- James Lanphier as Channon
- David Opatoshu as Sender
- Frieda Altman as Frade
- Henry Lascoe
- Ferdi Hoffman
- Joe Silver
- Maurice Franklin
- Frank Harrison
- Earl George

== Production ==
Though not announced as such at the time, this June 1949 episode represented the screen debut of its star, Mary Sinclair, (Note: The same could almost be said of her leading man, James Lanphier, for whom this was, however, at least his sophomore outing, having appeared the previous month, complete with last name misspelled, in a role deemed minor in a fairly obscure NBC offering; the odd man out amidst four "featured" performers in the five-character, half-hour chamber drama, "Tin Cup Captain".) who had, by then, performed extensively on the stage.

On June 8, Variety reported that CBS-TV's John Demott, who had already introduced such techniques as rear projection into television, had now devised a new process shot system for this episode.

To make possible scenes showing the soul of one character entering the body of another, DeMott had the 'ghost' performing against a jet-black screen, which gave him a disembodied effect. Other characters performed before the standard set and then, through super-imposing one camera over another, the merging illusion was created. Actors rehearsed the scene together before the show but worked at opposite ends of the studio during the actual production.

DeNott likened this process to the split-screen effect used in Hollywood, as he himself had done while working on Paramount's The Ghost Breakers, almost a decade before.

== Release ==
The television play was broadcast on CBS as season 1, episode 16 of its Studio One series on June 1, 1949.

Bowling Green University currently holds a copy of this episode's shooting script.

== Reception ==
New Republic TV critic Saul Carson called it "the most satisfying dramatic performance I have yet seen on the new medium". Citing both "superb acting by Arnold Moss [and] Liss and Miner's thorough grasp of television's possibilities", Carson concludes his review on a cautionary note. "It would be tragic if the Liss-Miner 'Dybbuk' were relegated to the status of one-shot; it should be in television's repertory." The trade publication Variety—aside from concluding its review with a bit of friendly advice directed to the show's sponsor, Westinghouse (Note: "The poetry of the drama was interrupted and in a show like this, which depends upon sustaining mood, the digressions were jarring. With themes of this type, more goodwill to a sponsor would be generated by dropping those middle spiels.")–was no less enthusiastic, dubbing the episode "one of the group's best efforts to date".

A difficult proposition to capture on video, in Studio One's adaptation, the poetic quality of the folklore was ever-present, and the beliefs of the burgers of this village in Mitteleuropa were presented in a manner that didn't strain credulity. [...] Performances were superior. Mary Sinclair and James Lanphier as the ill-fated lovers and Arnold Moss as the rabbi entrusted to exorcise the wandering soul gave the production its high dramatic spots. [...] Washington [sic] Miner's production, Joseph Liss's adaptation, Paul Nickell's direction, and incidental choreography by Felicia Rorel all contribute to making this one of the studio's most successful productions.

The Jewish Advocate reviewer Cy Shapiro called it "one of the finest TV shows I have ever seen" and praising the stars and bit players alike. He also reports that over 500,000 people had seen the broadcast, and that CBS was subsequently "flooded with requests to repeat same and to present other fine Jewish plays in English, and many ask[ing] for plays in the Yiddish language".
