= The Judge and His Hangman (Studio One) =

- Studio One episode
- Episode no.: Season 8 Episode 9
- Directed by: William H. Brown Jr.
- Written by: Dick Berg
- Based on: The Judge and His Hangman by Friedrich Dürrenmatt
- Original air date: November 14, 1955

Episode chronology
← Previous "Shakedown Cruise"	Next → "Of Human Bondage"

"The Judge and His Hangman" is an episode of the CBS television anthology series Studio One consisting of an hour-long adaptation of Friedrich Dürrenmatt's 1950 novel of the same name. The episode was first broadcast November 14, 1955. Adapted by Dick Berg and directed by William H. Brown Jr., the episode starred Kurt Kasznar, Charles Korvin, and Luis Van Rooten.

== Cast ==
Credits derived from November 12, 1955 issue of TV Guide's Chicago Edition.

- Barlach – Kurt Kasznar
- Gastmann - Charles Korvin
- Laszlo - Herbert Berghof
- Tschantz – Jamie Smith
- Von Schwendi – George Voskovec
- Lutz – Luis Van Rooten

== Premise ==
In Bern, Switzerland, the deceptively low-key commissioner of police announces that the mystery surrounding the death of a fellow officer has been solved. Exactly how this solution was reached is revealed through a series of flashbacks.

== Reception ==
Both Ben Gross of the New York Daily News and Post-Gazette TV writer Win Fanning praised Berg's adaptation, but Fanning found it especially valuable as a showcase for Kasznar's "immeasurable talent." Likewise, Hartford Courant critic George Tashman valued, first and foremost, "Kasznar's diabolical portrayal," while deeming the production overall, "an unpleasant little drama [featuring a] highly contrived plot [and] dozens of fluffed lines, [yet one made] enjoyable [by] the acting of Kasznar, Luis van Rooten as the minister of police, and Charles Korvin as Gastmann."

== See also ==
- End of the Game, 1975 theatrical film based on the same novel
