= Martin E. Brooks =

American actor (1925–2015)

- Publicity Photo of Martin E. Brooks
- Born: Martin Baum; November 30, 1925; New York, New York, U.S.
- Died: December 7, 2015 (aged 90); Los Angeles, California, U.S.
- Occupation: Actor
- Years active: 1951–1996

Martin E. Brooks (born Martin Baum; November 30, 1925 – December 7, 2015) was an American character actor known for playing scientist Rudy Wells in the television shows The Six Million Dollar Man and The Bionic Woman, from 1975 onward. The role had very briefly been played by Martin Balsam and then by Alan Oppenheimer.

== Early life ==
Brooks was born Martin Baum in The Bronx in New York City in 1925. When he was 10, he moved with his family to Wilkes-Barre, Pennsylvania. After high school, he volunteered to serve in the U.S. Army, became a paratrooper with the 11th Airborne Division and was awarded a Purple Heart for injuries received during World War II. He attended Penn State University and enrolled at the Dramatic Workshop of the New School for Social Research in New York City. He won the off-Broadway best actor award for his performance in Outside the Door and changed his name to Martin Brooks, following the advice of producer Richard Rodgers.

== Career ==
=== Acting ===
==== Theatre ====
In 1959, Brooks starred in Saul Levitt's hit play The Andersonville Trial with Brian Donlevy and Charles Durning. He was very proud of his theatre work that included An Enemy of the People and I Am a Camera, as well as the actors with whom he appeared, including Julie Harris and Barbara Bel Geddes. Brooks was also in John Steinbeck's Burning Bright as Victor with Kent Smith as Joe Saul, Barbara Bel Geddes as Mordeen, and Howard Da Silva as Friend Ed which he had adapted from his 1950 novel of the same name.

==== Television ====
In the 1950s, Brooks appeared in The Philco–Goodyear Television Playhouse.In the 1960s, he appeared in Combat!. In the 1972–73 TV season, he had a recurring role as Deputy D.A. Chapman in McMillan & Wife. In the fall of 1977, Brooks and Richard Anderson (as Oscar Goldman) became the first known actors to portray the same characters as regulars simultaneously on two different networks. NBC picked up The Bionic Woman after the series had been cancelled by ABC. ABC continued to air The Six Million Dollar Man. Brooks had, by that time, been promoted to series regular on both series. The unusual situation lasted only one season as the two series were cancelled by their respective networks in the spring of 1978.

Brooks reprised the role of Wells in three television movies: The Return of the Six-Million-Dollar Man and the Bionic Woman (1987), Bionic Showdown: The Six Million Dollar Man and the Bionic Woman (1989) and Bionic Ever After? (1994). His other television roles include in Mike Snow in Hunter, Arthur Bradshaw in General Hospital, Car 54, Where Are You?, Gunsmoke (“The Lure”-1967), Mission: Impossible, Night Gallery, Love, American Style, The Mod Squad, and ten appearances as Edgar Randolph in the prime-time soap opera Dallas, playing a pivotal role in a story arc involving J.R. Ewing. Brooks also guest-starred in an episode of The Silent Force in 1970. He appeared in Knots Landing as Ted Burton in the 1990s.

=== Writing ===
Brooks wrote two novels: Danny Brown and Roman Candle. His play Flo and Joe was optioned for a Broadway production and received several workshop productions at the Actors Studio and at Theatre West.

== Personal life and death ==
According to Jon Landau, Brooks was the "soulmate" of Landau's mother, Edie, for over 20 years. They were friends as children and reconnected in 1993 after her husband died. Brooks was friends with Charles Durning when they met in 1959 in Saul Levitt's hit play The Andersonville Trial until Durning's death in 2012.

Brooks died on December 7, 2015, of natural causes at his home in Studio City in Los Angeles, aged 90.

== Awards and honors ==
Brooks won the Theatre World Award and the Donaldson Award for his role in Burning Bright.

== Filmography ==
=== Film ===
Year	Title	Role	Notes	Ref.
1957	Johnny Gunman	Johnny G.^{1}	Drama film written and directed by Art Ford	
1970	Colossus: The Forbin Project	Dr. Jefferson J. Johnson^{1}	Science fiction–thrill film directed by Joseph Sargent; Based on the novel Colossus by D. F. Jones	
1972	The Man	Wheeler's Lawyer	Political drama directed by Joseph Sargent and written by Rod Serling; Largely based on Irving Wallace's The Man	
1994	T-Force	Dr. Jon Gant	Science fiction directed by Richard Pepin	
1996	Street Gun	Man thrown off the roof	Thriller film directed by Travis Milloy (final film role)	

=== Television ===
Year	Title	Role	Notes	Ref.
1951	Sure as Fate^{1}	Guest	Episode: "The Rabbit" (S 1:Ep 17)	
1951	The Philco–Goodyear Television Playhouse	Guest	Episode: "Dr. Hudson's Secret Journal" (S 3:Ep 41)	
1951	Fireside Theatre	Guest	Episode: "A Little Night Music" (S 3:Ep 41)	
1952	Suspense	Harry Raymond	Episode: "Remember Me?" (S 4:Ep 45)	
1952	Joan of Arc^{1}	Guest	Made-for-TV Movie^{2}	
1953	Suspense	Meros Leckow	Episode: "The Man Who Cried Wolf" (S 5:Ep 33)	
1953	Campbell Summer Soundstage^{1}	Guest	Episode: "Deception" (S 2:Ep 6)	
1953	Studio One in Hollywood	Guest	Episode: "The Storm" (S 5:Ep 50)	
1953	Armstrong Circle Theatre^{1}	Guest	Episode: "The Honor of Littorno" (S 4:Ep 10)	
1954	Suspense^{1}	Guest	Episode: "Once a Killer" (S 6:Ep 43)	
1954	Studio One in Hollywood	Stephano^{1}	Episode: "The Cliff" (S 6:Ep 52)	
1954	The Philco–Goodyear Television Playhouse	Guest	Episode: "Time of Delivery" (S 7:Ep 4)	
1955	Justice^{1}	Guest	Episode: "Cry Wolf" (S 2:Ep 15)	
1955	Armstrong Circle Theatre^{1}	Guest	Episode: "Leap for Freedom" (S 5:Ep 31)	
1955	Climax!	Guest	Episode: "A Farewell to Arms" (S 1:Ep 26); Based on A Farewell to Arms by Ernest Hemingway; Adaptation by Gore Vidal	
1955	Studio One in Hollywood	Paul^{1}	Episode: "Mama's Boy" (S 7:Ep 51)	
1955	Studio One in Hollywood	Peters^{1}	Episode: "Shakedown Cruise" (S 8:Ep 8)	
1956	Eye on New York	Lt. Jan Kepart^{1}	Episode: "Night of the Auk" (S 1:Ep 1–Pilot)	
1957	Armstrong Circle Theatre	Aristides Andros	Episode: "Have Jacket Will Travel" (S 8:Ep 11)^{4}	
1957	Decoy	Larry^{1}	Episode: "Necklace of Glass" (S 1:Ep 9)	
1957	True Story	Bruce Mansfield^{1}	Episode: "Girl in Hotel" (S 1:Ep 12)	
1957	Suspicion^{1}	Guest	Episode: "The Sparkle of Diamonds" (S 1:Ep 8)	
1957	Armstrong Circle Theatre	The Priest^{1}	Episode: "The Shepherd of Paris" (S 8:Ep 7)^{4}	
1957–58	Love of Life	Paul Raven	Contract role	
1958	The United States Steel Hour	Martin Mandow^{1}	Episode: "The Charmer" (S 5:Ep 9)	
1958	True Story	Bill Farrell^{1}	Episode: "22 March 1958" (S 1:Ep 18)	
1958	Kraft Television Theatre	Mr. Ferguson^{1}	Episode: "Death Wears Many Faces" (S 11:Ep 420	
1958	The Secret Storm	Skip Curtis	Contract role	
1959	New York Confidential	Sammy Watts	Episode: "Broadway Sam" (S 1:Ep 17)	
1959	New York Confidential	Ralph	Episode: "The Skin Game" (S 1:Ep 20)	
1960	Sunday Showcase	Guest	Episode: "The Margaret Bourke White Story" (S 1:Ep 16)	
1960	Armstrong Circle Theatre	Lewis Benson	Episode: "Full Disclosure" (S 10:Ep 7)^{5}	
1960	Dow Hour of Great Mysteries	Jack Bailey^{1}	Episode: "The Bat" (S 1:Ep 1–Pilot); Apdation of Mary Roberts Rinehart and Avery Hopwood's Broadway play The Bat	
1961	Way Out	The Face^{1}	Episode: "False Face" (S 1:Ep 7)	
1961	Car 54, Where Are You?	Petrucio^{3}	Episode: "The Taming of Lucille" (S 1:Ep 12)	
1962–64	Search for Tomorrow	Dr. Everett Moore	Contract role	
1963	Look Up and Live	Jim^{1}	Episode: "The Presence of Death" (S 3:Ep 12)	
1963	The DuPont Show of the Week	Joe Vanderling	Episode: "Diamond Fever" (S 2:Ep 13)	
1963	Armstrong Circle Theatre	Major Rickert	Episode: "The Aggressor Force" (s 13:Ep 17}4	
1965	Combat!	Corporal MacGowan^{1}	Episode: "The Raider" (S 4:Ep 16)	
1966	The Loner	Chris Meegan^{1}	Episode: "Pick Me Another Time to Die" (S 1:Ep 24)	
1966	Flipper	Kent^{1}	Episode: "Flipper's Underwater Museum" (S 2:Ep 27)	
1966	The F.B.I.	Richard Larken^{1}	Episode: "Anatomy of a Prison Break" (S 2:Ep 10)	
1967	Gunsmoke	Young^{1}	Episode: "The Lure"	
1967	The Fugitive	Lieutenant Gould^{1}	Episode: "The Walls of Night" (S 4:Ep 27)	
1967	Iron Horse	Gilbert Reese^{1}	Episode: "Diablo" (S 2:Ep 1)	
1967	The Wild Wild West	Franklin Poore	Episode: "The Night of the Hangman" (S 3:Ep 7)	
1968	The F.B.I.	Bobby Devries	Episode: "The Predators" (S 3:Ep 25)	
1968	Judd, for the Defense	Art Barrows	Episode: "The Gates of Cerberus" (S 2:Ep 10)	
1969	Mission: Impossible	Paul Trock	Episode: "Illusion" (S 3:Ep 24)	
1970	The Silent Force	Guest	Episode: "The Hero" (S 1:Ep 2)	
1970	The Old Man Who Cried Wolf	Hudson F. Ewing	Made-for-TV Movie directed by Walter Grauman	
1971	Night Gallery	Doctor Armstrong	Episode: "They're Tearing Down Tim Riley's Bar / The Last Laurel" (S 1:Ep 6–b)	
1971	Storefront Lawyers	Kendrick	Episode: "This Money Kills Dreams" (S 1:Ep 22)	
1971	Love, American Style	Guest	Episode: "Love and the Anniversary Crisis / Love and the Conjugal Visit / Love and the Dream Burglar / Love and the Hotel Caper / Love and the Monster" (S 3:Ep 2)	
1971	Cannon	Lewis R. Enders	Episode: "Dead Pigeon" (S 1:Ep 8)	
1971	The Partners	Feeny	Episode: "Have I Got an Apartment for You!" (S 1:Ep 10)	
1971	The Mod Squad	Richard Clark	Episode: "Death of a Nobody" (S 4:Ep 13)	
1972	Owen Marshall: Counselor at Law	Pierce	Episode: "Smiles from Yesterday" (S 1:Ep 21)	
1972–73	McMillan & Wife	Deputy D.A. Chapman	Recurring	
1975–78	The Six Million Dollar Man	Dr. Rudy Wells	Contract role	
1976–78	The Bionic Woman	Dr. Rudy Wells	Contract role	
1981	General Hospital	Dr. Arthur Bradshaw	Contract role	
1983-84	Dallas	Edgar Randolph	10 episodes	
1985	Benson	Mr. Burger	season 7 episode 6 "$1 million an hour"	
