= Frieda Altman =

American actress (1904–2002)

- Born: August 18, 1904; Boston, Massachusetts, U.S.
- Died: January 14, 2002 (aged 97); New York, New York, U.S.
- Education: Boston Latin School; Wellesley College
- Occupation: Actress
- Years active: 1932–1971
- Known for: Search for Tomorrow
- Spouse: Benjamin B. Gamzue (m. 1933; died 1993)

Frieda Altman (August 18, 1904 – January 14, 2002) was an American theatre and television character actress, perhaps best known for her recurring role as Mrs. Miller, the housekeeper, on Search for Tomorrow.

== Early life and career ==
Born in Boston, Massachusetts, on August 18, 1904, Altman was the daughter of Russian Jewish immigrants Samuel and Bella Altman. She attended George Putnam School, Boston Latin School (class of 1920), and Wellesley College, earning her Bachelor of Arts in 1924. Having done so roughly two months before her 20th birthday, Altman was said to be the second youngest member of her graduating class.

In the spring of 1916, at age 11, Altman had reportedly been one of "500 little dancers" performing at the annual May Festival held at the Mechanic's Building in Boston. In a similar vein is her next documented public appearance, seven years later, wherein another annual event, Wellesley College's annual Tree Day, formed the backdrop for a variety of solo and group dances, including Altman and four others "tak[ing] part in an odd dance of candy sticks".

In February 1926, Altman was credited as "assistant to directors" in a production of Indian poet/playwright Kalidasa's signature work, Shakuntala. By April of that year, having advanced to "Chairman of Dramatics" of Junior Hadassah, Altman was also the second-billed player in that group's staging of Abraham Goldfaden's Shulamith, presented entirely in the original Yiddish. Approximately one year later, at Boston's Brattle Hall, Altman starred as Vera in a production of Israel Zangwill's The Melting Pot, staged by the Junior Council of Temple Ashkenaz, Cambridge, Massachusetts. In 1929, Altman portrayed the Virgin Mary in A Christmas Mystery, a production which marked the resumption—after a two-year lapse—of the Boston Public Library's annual Nativity Play presentation. The following February, while not appearing herself, Altman did direct The Eternal Song by Marc Arnstein, one of a pair of one-act plays comprising the debut of the Temple Israel Little Theatre of Boston. By December of that year, Altman had joined an amateur troupe performing in the Greater Boston region, called Lend-a-Hand Masque; on Saturday the 6th, she performed in their production of Aladdin and His Wonderful Lamp, staged at the Brookline High School auditorium.

Prior to making her 1932 Broadway debut, Altman was with Falmouth's University Players, for a period of approximately eight months, beginning no later than December 1931. Her fellow performers included, at various times, Margaret Sullavan, Henry Fonda, James Stewart, Kent Smith, Mildred Natwick, Myron McCormick, and Bretaigne Windust, as well as actor/director Joshua Logan. During that first month, she was part of a large supporting cast in the comedy, It's a Wise Child, starring Sullavan and Fonda, and directed by Logan. Later, in Don Marquis's passion play, The Dark Hours, Altman portrayed Mary Magdalene, alongside Logan himself as Pontius Pilate, Windust as Judas Iscariot, and—as Procla, Pilate's wife—Logan's future offstage spouse, Barbara O'Neil. Later still, as Mrs. Barwick, she appeared alongside Windust, O'Neil, Natwick, and McCormick in John Balderston's time-travel fantasy, Berkeley Square.

In 1952, Altman, as "Aunt Sarah", and child actress Patsy Bruder as "Alice", co-starred in "Little Girl", an episode of Lights Out, in which Sarah's seemingly sad but harmless delusion—mistaking Alice for a girl who had gone missing many years before—may in fact prove life-threatening for her niece.

In the 1963 DuPont Show of the Week episode, "Ride with Terror" (remade in 1967 as The Incident), Altman, Vincent Gardenia, Gene Hackman, and Ron Leibman were among the NYC Subway riders terrorized by delinquents Tony Musante and Gregory Rozakis. In 1967, she co-starred with Boris Tumarin in the Eternal Light episode, "The Book and the Window", with Tumarin portraying Israel Friedlander and Altman as his wife, Lilian.

From 1965 to 1971, Altman had the recurring role of Mrs. Miller, the housekeeper, on the CBS soap opera, Search for Tomorrow.

== Personal life and death ==
On September 3, 1933, Altman married Benjamin—aka Boris—Gamzue, a Latvian-born professor of English and literature who spent most if not all of his career on the faculty of New York University.

Predeceased by her husband, Altman died in Manhattan at age 97, on January 14, 2002.

== Broadway credits ==
- 1932: Another Language as Grace Hallam
- 1932: Carry Nation as Mrs. Gloyd
- 1933: We the People as Passer-by
- 1933: Hilda Cassidy as Mrs. Miller
- 1934: Picnic as Mademoiselle
- 1934: Spring Song as Tillie Solomon
- 1935: Paradise Lost as Bertha
- 1936: Timber House as Alvina Glouster
- 1936: Days to Come as Cora Rodman
- 1937: Marching Song as Jenny Russell
- 1938: Yr. Obedient Husband as Podd
- 1939: Pastoral as Sara Ten Brock
- 1941: Gabrielle as Frau Spatz
- 1941: Ah, Wilderness as Lily Miller, Nat's sister
- 1942: Counsellor-at-Law as Goldie Rindskoff (as Freida Altman)
- 1942: Guest in the House as Miss Rhodes
- 1943: The Naked Genius as Mrs. Davis
- 1944: Hickory Stick as Bettina Pessolano
- 1946: A Joy Forever as Mrs. Tillery
- 1946: Little Brown Jug as Lydia
- 1946: Land's End as Miss Penrose
- 1947: The Wanhope Building as Madam Endor
- 1948: Strange Bedfellows as Mrs. Gimble
- 1948: The Young and Fair as Emmy Foster
- 1950: Hilda Crane as Miss Keavney
- 1955: The Southwest Corner as Hattie Carew
- 1957: The Waltz of the Toreadors as First Maid
- 1958: The Visit as Frau Burgomaster, Frau Schill (replacement)
- 1959: Chéri as Madame Valerie Aldonza
- 1960: A Distant Bell as Keene Stanfield

== Filmography ==
=== Films ===
- 1945: The House on 92nd Street as Saboteur (uncredited)
- 1954: Go Man Go as Ticket seller (uncredited)
- 1964: Fail Safe as Jenny Johnson

=== Television ===
- Studio One
  - Ep. "The Dybbuk" (1949) as Frade
- Suspense
  - Ep. "The Third One" (1949) as Mrs. Sheperone
- The Trap
  - Ep. "The Dark Corner" (1950)
- Flashgun Casey
  - Ep. "The Gentle Strangler" (1951)
- Ellery Queen
  - Ep. "Death of a Wax Doll" (1952)
- Lights Out
  - Ep. "Little Girl" (1952) as Aunt Hannah
- Suspense
  - Ep. "Remember Me?" (1952) as Mrs. Liebowitz
- One Woman's Story
  - Ep. "My Son, Paul" (1952)
- The Doctor
  - Ep. "A Pile of Rocks" (1952) as Maud Gutherie
- Studio One
  - Ep. "An Almanac of Liberty" (1954) as Mrs. Nathan
- Hallmark Hall of Fame
  - Ep. "Macbeth" (1954) as Second Witch
- The Ella Raines Show
  - Ep. "Gomez Case"
  - Ep. "The Murch Case"
- The Elgin Hour
  - Ep. "Mind Over Momma" on (1955) as Sadie Mandel
- The United States Steel Hour
  - Ep. "Hunted" (1956) – Landlady
- Armstrong Circle Theatre
  - Ep. "The Complex Mummy Complex" (1957)
- The United States Steel Hour
  - Ep. "Family Happiness" (1959) – Tatyana Semenova
- Naked City
  - Ep. "Even Crows Sing Good" (1959) as Mama Hine
- The Play of the Week
  - Ep. "The House of Bernarda Alba" (1960) as Prudentia
- Naked City
  - Ep. "A Memory of Crying" (1961) as Mrs. Howard (the florist)
- The DuPont Show of the Week
  - Ep. "Ride With Terror" on (1963) as Bertha Beckerman
- Search for Tomorrow
  - Numerous Episodes (1965–1971) as Mrs. Miller
- The Eternal Light
  - Ep. "The Book and the Window" (1967) as Lilian (Mrs. Israel Friedlander)
