= Sacco-Vanzetti Story =

- NBC Sunday Showcase episode
- Directed by: Sidney Lumet
- Written by: Reginald Rose
- Original air date: June 3, 1960

"Sacco-Vanzetti Story" is a two-part American television play that was broadcast on June 3, 1960, and June 10, 1960, as part of the NBC Sunday Showcase series.

The play tells the story of the arrest, trial, conviction, and execution of Italian anarchists Sacco and Vanzetti in the famed criminal case of the 1920s. It was written by Reginald Rose, directed by Sidney Lumet, and starred Martin Balsam as Sacco and Steven Hill as Vanzetti. The production received four Primetime Emmy Awards nominations, including "Program of the Year" and for best writing and directorial achievement in a drama.

== Plot ==
The play tells the story, in semi-documentary form, of the Italian-born anarchists, Sacco and Vanzetti, who were arrested, tried, and executed for the murder of a guard and the paymaster during the robbery of a shoe factory in South Braintree, Massachusetts.

The first hour was aired on June 3, 1960, covering the events occurring between the arrest and conviction. The production opens with the two men in their jail cells and uses flashbacks depicting the police investigation. It then reenacts portions of the trial, focusing on abuses by the presiding judge and prosecutor, and suggests that the men were convicted because of their radical political beliefs and due to prejudice against foreigners.

The second hour was aired on June 10, 1960, covering the six years following the convictions, including appeals, the confession of Celestino Medeiros that he was the actual killer, public protests, the commission established by Gov. Alvan T. Fuller to assess the fairness of the trial, and the execution in 1927.

== Cast ==
The cast included over 150 performers, including the following principal roles:

- Martin Balsam as Nicola Sacco
- Steven Hill as Bartolomeo Vanzetti
- Frank Campanella as prison guard
- Dana Elcar as newspaperman
- Stuart Germain as Judge Webster Thayer
- Carroll O'Connor as Frederick G. Katzmann, the prosecutor
- E. G. Marshall as William Thompson, attorney
- Robert Emhart as Gov. Alvan T. Fuller
- Ben Grauer, narrator

== Production ==
The idea for the production came from Reginald Rose who wrote the teleplay. Rose had won acclaim for his award-winning teleplay, Twelve Angry Men (1954).

Robert Alan Aurthur was the producer, and Sidney Lumet directed. Jan Scott was the art director. The play was produced on videotape rather than being broadcast live.

Lumet struggled with Rose and Aurthur as to how to present Vanzetti's address to the judge with Rose and Aurthur advocating a more feisty approach and Lumet favoring a simpler approach. Lumet prevailed and recalled Hill's performance as "just brilliant, it was just underplayed and so simple and so direct."

Rose later wrote a stage play based on his Sacco-Vanzetti teleplay. The stage play was titled This Agony, This Triumph and staged by the USC drama department in 1970.

=== Emmy nominations ===
The production was nominated for four Primetime Emmy Awards, but did not win in any category. The nominations were:

- Program of the Year
- Outstanding Program Achievement in the Field of Drama
- Reginald Rose, for Outstanding Writing Achievement in Drama
- Sidney Lumet, for Outstanding Directorial Achievement in Drama

== Reception ==
In The New York Times, Jack Gould praised the acting of Balsam and Hill. However, he found the overall production to be "workman-like" and "disappointingly superficial."

In the New York Daily News, Ben Gross praised NBC and the program's sponsor for their courage in presenting the play and called it "a blasting indictment of Massachusetts justice" and "one of the most controversial ever seen on television."

Critic Charlie Wadsworth praised Rose's teleplay as "an outstanding piece of writing". He also praised the performances of Balsam and Hill as "magnificent".

On the day after the first part was aired, The Boston Globe published a front-page response by its legal editor, Joseph M. Harvey. Harvey criticized the production for presenting "only the defense side of the case" and damaging public perceptions as to how justice is administered in Massachusetts. He added that, while the production may have been "stirring" and "absorbing" as a drama, "the script was guilty of shameless distortions and omissions."

In another front-page presentation following the second part, The Boston Globe's TV critic, Percy Shain gave the production four stars and wrote that it left a "nauseating picture" of Governor Alvan T. Fuller.

In the Los Angeles Times, Cecil Smith called it "a powerful piece of work, skillfully written by Rose and ably directed by Sidney Lumet, which -- agree with its premise or not -- should stir the blood."

Larry Wolters of the Chicago Tribune praised Lumet's "matchless direction" and called it "a great TV project."
