= Burning Bright =

1950 novel by John Steinbeck

- First edition cover
- Author: John Steinbeck
- Language: English
- Publisher: The Viking Press
- Publication date: 1950
- Publication place: United States
- Media type: Print (Hardback & Paperback)
- Pages: 93 pp

Burning Bright is a 1950 novella by John Steinbeck written as an experiment with producing a play in novel format. Rather than providing only the dialogue and brief stage directions as would be expected in a play, Steinbeck fleshes out the scenes with details of both the characters and the environment. The intention was to allow the play to be read by the non-theatrical reader while still allowing the dialogue to be lifted and performed with little adaptation by acting companies. While Steinbeck could see that providing little information in the way of physical description or stage direction allowed the director and actors greater freedom and scope for imaginative interpretation, he weighed this against the benefit of making the players aware of the author's intent and making the play accessible to the general reader.

== Plot ==
The story is a simple morality play concerning Joe Saul, an aging man desperate for a child. His young wife, Mordeen, who loves him, suspects that he is sterile, and in order to please him by bearing him a child, she becomes pregnant by Saul's cocky young assistant, Victor. The fourth character in the story is Friend Ed, a long-time friend of Saul and Mordeen, who helps the couple through the ordeal after Joe discovers that he is indeed infertile and the child can not be his. The story is meant to be that of an everyman (early in its development Steinbeck had thought of calling the play Everyman), so the setting for each of the three acts recasts the four characters in different situations: the first act is set in a circus, Saul and Victor are trapeze artists and Friend Ed, a clown; in the second act, Saul and Friend Ed become neighbouring farmers and Victor appears as Saul's farmhand. In the final act Saul is the captain of a ship, Mr. Victor, his mate, and Friend Ed a seaman about to put out on a different ship. Act three is divided into two scenes; the final scene is set in a hospital where the child is delivered; it makes no reference to any of the settings of the three acts, and so serves equally as a conclusion for any of the stories.

== Development ==
Burning Bright was Steinbeck's third attempt at writing what he called a "play-novelette". He had tried something similar with Of Mice and Men in 1937 and The Moon Is Down in 1942, but, of the three, Burning Bright was the most complete attempt at the form. Steinbeck believed that he may have been the first person to attempt the style. At the time of writing the introduction, in which he explained his intentions, he believed it was a form that would bear further experimentation. In a continuation of the experiment, a stage production was planned to open at the same time the book was published. The original title of the book, In the Forests of the Night, was a line from The Tyger by William Blake, but complaints that it was too long and too literary by the producers of the play led to the change to the shorter excerpt from the same poem: Burning Bright.

Friend Ed has been pointed out as one in a line of characters inspired by Steinbeck's best friend Ed Ricketts. At the time Steinbeck wrote Burning Bright, Ricketts had recently been killed in a car accident, and as well as reflecting his friend's character in that of Friend Ed, it is thought that the settings of the circus and the sea may have had significance for Steinbeck: he had apparently been at the circus when he learnt of Ricketts' death and Ricketts' burial had been beside the sea.

== Adaptation ==
The stage production in 1950 had Rodgers and Hammerstein as producers, Guthrie McClintic as director, Kent Smith as Joe Saul, Barbara Bel Geddes as Mordeen, Howard Da Silva as Friend Ed, and Martin E. Brooks as Victor. The production had a short run at New Haven during which Steinbeck tightened up the second act, but despite his work on the play, confidence in it was fading. When the production moved to Boston for the main run the critical reviews were terrible, and the play closed after only thirteen performances. One of the co-producers admitted that he had known the production was doomed after the first night. Steinbeck was later upbeat about the failure of the play and stated he was still keen to continue working in the theatre:

I'm just determined I'm going to learn something about the theatre. Last time we were kicked around like dogs, but I still want to do it. This shows a truly pure quality of stupidity. Just nuts. I'm so fascinated by everything about the theatre I don't really care if the show's a flop.

Despite his apparent continued enthusiasm after the failure of Burning Bright, Steinbeck never made another attempt at producing anything for the theatre.

In 1959 NTA Film Network in The Play of the Week broadcast Burning Bright with Myron McCormick as Joe Saul, Colleen Dewhurst as Mordeen, Dana Elcar as friend Ed and Donald Madden as Victor. The play can be seen on the streaming service BroadwayHD.

Burning Bright was turned into an opera by American composer Frank Lewin. The opera had its premiere in 1993, with Elaine Steinbeck in attendance.

== Critical reception ==
The reviews of the book were as poor as the reviews of the stage production. While some critics acknowledged it for the experiment that Steinbeck had intended, it was seen as peculiar and at best moderately effective. The artificial use of language, while necessary to allow the characters' development on the stage, jarred with the critics reviewing the novelization, as did Steinbeck's overemphasis of the message of the play.

== Sources ==
- Steinbeck, John (2000). Burning Bright. Penguin Classics. p. 93. ISBN 0141186062.
- Benson, Jackson J. (1990). John Steinbeck, Writer: A Biography. Penguin. p. 1184. ISBN 014014417X.
- Tamm, Eric Enno (2004). Beyond the Outer Shores. Four Walls Eight Windows. p. 365. ISBN 1568582986.
- McElrath Jr., Joseph R.; Crisler, Jesse S.; Shillinglaw, Susan, eds. (1996). John Steinbeck: The Contemporary Reviews. Cambridge University Press. p. 588. ISBN 052141038X.
- Fensch, Thomas, ed. (1989). Conversations with John Steinbeck. University Press of Mississippi. p. 160. ISBN 0878053603.
