= Kurt Kasznar =

Austrian-American actor (1913–1979)

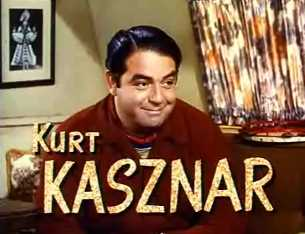
- from the trailer for the film Lili (1953)
- Born: Kurt Servischer; August 13, 1913; Vienna, Austria-Hungary
- Died: August 6, 1979 (aged 65); Santa Monica, California, U.S.
- Occupation: Actor
- Years active: 1924–1978
- Spouses: Cornelia Woolley (m. 1939; died 1948) Leora Dana (m. 1950; div. 1958)

Kurt Kasznar (born Kurt Servischer; August 13, 1913 – August 6, 1979) was an Austrian-American stage, film and television actor who played roles on Broadway, appearing in the original Broadway productions of Waiting for Godot, The Sound of Music and Barefoot in the Park. He also appeared in feature films and had many notable parts in television, including the science fiction series Land of the Giants.

"A big, glib, dapper man who spoke with an accent, he was almost always cast as some sort of a Continental gentleman," reported The New York Times.

As a soldier in World War II, Kasznar was among the first U.S. Army photographers to film the ruins of Hiroshima and Nagasaki.

== Early life ==
Kurt Kasznar was born Kurt Servischer on August 13, 1913, in Vienna, Austria-Hungary. His family was Jewish. His father left the family when Kurt was very young. After his mother married Hungarian restaurateur Ferdinand Kasznar, Kurt assumed his surname. While working as an apprentice waiter at his stepfather's restaurant, Kasznar met director Max Reinhardt and enrolled in his seminars. "There I learned to act, write, build sets and live," Kasznar said later.

At age eleven Kasznar appeared in Der Zirkuskönig (The King of the Circus, 1924), the last movie made by Max Linder, which was filmed in Vienna. Kasznar began working on the stage in 1931, in a performance of Jedermann (Everyman) at the Salzburg Festival.

== Career ==
In 1936 Kasznar left Austria for the United States, with Max Reinhardt's theater company. He appeared in Reinhardt's production of The Eternal Road, playing the role of Zebulon in the premiere performance July 7, 1937, and performing at least a dozen roles during the three-month Broadway run of the epic production.

In 1941 Kasznar produced a two-act Broadway musical revue, Crazy With the Heat, which ended as a financial failure. Later that year he was drafted into the United States Army. He was trained as a cinematographer and later served in the Pacific. Assigned to a photographic unit, he filmed landings on New Guinea and in the Philippines, and the signing of the Japanese surrender aboard the USS Missouri. He was one of the first Army photographers to film the aftermath of the atomic bombings of Hiroshima and Nagasaki.

While in service, Corporal Kurt S. Kasznar wrote and performed in his only play, First Cousins, which he dedicated "to the thousands of foreign-born American soldiers." Kasznar's play was one of five that won a contest for soldier-playwrights and were published in the 1943 book The Army Play by Play. The one-act plays were performed on Broadway for the benefit of the Sailors and Soldiers Club, and were later staged at Hyde Park for President Franklin D. Roosevelt. In his 2004 study, Staging the War: American Drama and World War II, Albert Wertheim calls First Cousins – which tied for fourth place in the competition – "by far the most effective play in The Army Play by Play collection."

Kasznar's first major Broadway appearance was in the 1950 production of Samuel A. Taylor's play, The Happy Time. He recreated his role, that of Uncle Louie, for the 1952 film version and earned a Golden Globe nomination for his performance. Kasznar also appeared on Broadway as the director in Pirandello's Six Characters in Search of an Author (1955–1956), and he played Pozzo in the original Broadway production of Waiting for Godot (1956).

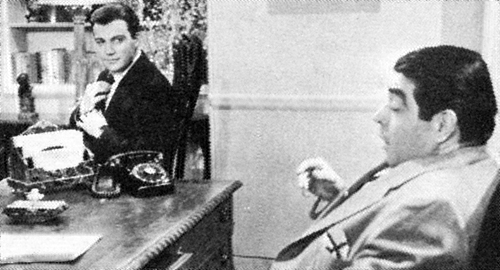
William Shatner (Archie Goodwin) and Kurt Kasznar (Nero Wolfe) in the unaired CBS-TV series Nero Wolfe (1959)

While performing on stage in Noël Coward's Look After Lulu! in March 1959, Kasznar was also playing detective Nero Wolfe in what would have been television's first series based on Rex Stout's characters. Co-starring William Shatner as Archie Goodwin and initially slated to air on CBS in September 1959, the Nero Wolfe series was aborted after a pilot and a few episodes were filmed.

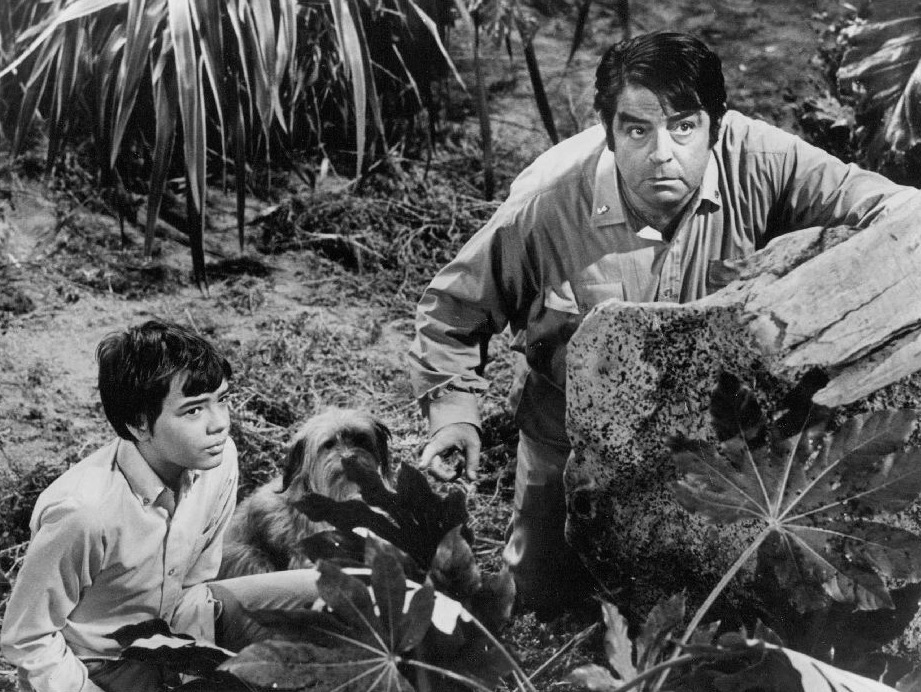
Kurt Kasznar and Stefan Arngrim in Land of the Giants, circa 1969

Kasznar created the role of Max Detweiler in the original Broadway production of The Sound of Music (1959–1963), for which he received a Tony Award nomination. "When that musical had marked its 1,000th performance, Mr. Kasznar was the only actor who had never missed a show," reported The New York Times. He was discussed as a possibility to re-create his stage role in the film version of The Sound of Music, but the role went to Richard Haydn. He debuted the role of Victor Velasco in Neil Simon's Barefoot in the Park (1963–1967).

He appeared as Tevye in several productions of Fiddler on the Roof. In 1974–1975 Kasznar, Myrna Loy, Edward Mulhare and Ricardo Montalbán toured nationwide in John Houseman's production of George Bernard Shaw's Don Juan in Hell, playing 158 cities in six months. In 1978 he played Mansky in Molnár's The Play's the Thing with "enormous authority," wrote New York Times critic Mel Gussow. "It is the kind of character he has played often, and consummately, on stage and in films."

Kasznar appeared in more than 80 films and television shows, and had a regular role in the Irwin Allen science fiction television series Land of the Giants as Alexander Fitzhugh. His feature films included Lili, Kiss Me Kate, The Last Time I Saw Paris, My Sister Eileen, A Farewell to Arms and 55 Days at Peking.

== Private life ==
Kasznar married American heiress Cornelia Woolley following her 1939 divorce from her second husband. The daughter of a New York woolen merchant, Woolley was widely known in the theater world for her philanthropy. She died at home unexpectedly in June 1948, at age 48; at the time, Kasznar was performing in John Houseman's Broadway production of Joy to the World.

Kasznar met his second wife, actress Leora Dana, when they worked together in the Broadway production of The Happy Time (1950). They married in 1950 and divorced in 1958.

== Death ==
Kasznar died on August 6, 1979, at age 65, in Santa Monica, California. Ten months earlier, he had been diagnosed with cancer. He had no known survivors.

== Partial filmography ==
- The Light Touch (1951) as Mr. Aramescu
- Anything Can Happen (1952) as Nuri Bey
- Talk About a Stranger (1952) as Matlock
- Lovely to Look At (1952) as Max Fogelsby
- The Happy Time (1952) as Uncle Louis Bonnard
- The Bad and the Beautiful (1952) as Party Guest (uncredited)
- Lili (1953) as Jacquot
- Sombrero (1953) as Father Zacaya
- Ride, Vaquero! (1953) as Father Antonio
- Kiss Me Kate (1953) as "Baptista"
- All the Brothers Were Valiant (1953) as Quint
- Give a Girl a Break (1953) as Leo Belney
- The Great Diamond Robbery (1954) as Louie
- Valley of the Kings (1954) as Hamed Backhour
- The Last Time I Saw Paris (1954) as Maurice
- Jump into Hell (1955) as Capt. Jean Callaux
- My Sister Eileen (1955) as "Papa" Appopolous
- Studio One (1955), as Barlach, 1 episode, "The Judge and His Hangman"
- Flame of the Islands (1956) as Cyril Mace
- Anything Goes (1956) as Victor Lawrence
- A Farewell to Arms (1957) as Bonello
- Legend of the Lost (1957) as Prefect Dukas
- Arms and the Man (1958) as Major Petkoff
- Frauensee (1958) as Nathanael Dobbs
- The Journey (1959) as Csepege
- For the First Time (1959) as Ladislas Tabory
- 55 Days at Peking (1963) as Baron Sergei Ivanoff
- Code Name: Heraclitus (1967) as Constantine
- Casino Royale (1967) as Smernov
- The King's Pirate (1967) as Zucco
- The Perils of Pauline (1967) as Consul General
- The Ambushers (1967) as Quintana
- Land of the Giants (1968–1970) as Alexander Fitzhugh
- Here's Lucy, 1 episode, "Lucy and the Group Therapy" (1971)
- Hawkins, as John Carraza, 1 episode, "Murder on the 13th Floor" (1973)
- Barnaby Jones episode, "Portrait of Evil" (1975)- George Andre (1975)
- Wonder Woman, 1 episode, "Judgment from Outer Space" (1977)
