= Thomas Donovan =

Thomas Donovan may refer to:

- Paddy Donovan (Thomas Patrick Donovan, 1936–2018), New Zealand amateur boxer and rugby union player
- Thomas Donovan (musician) (born 1964), Canadian singer-songwriter
- Thomas Donovan (politician) (1869–1946), American politician, businessman, and lawyer
- Thomas Donovan (rugby union) (1867–1938), Irish rugby union player
- T. J. Donovan (born 1974), American attorney and politician
- Thom Donovan (born 1974), American musician
- Tom Donovan (baseball) (1873–1911), Major League Baseball outfielder
- Tom Donovan (American football), American football wide receiver
