= Reginald Rose =

American playwright and screenwriter (1920–2002)

- Born: December 10, 1920; Manhattan, New York, U.S.
- Died: April 19, 2002 (aged 81); Norwalk, Connecticut, U.S.
- Occupations: Playwright, screenwriter
- Years active: 1951–1987
- Spouses: Barbara Langbart (m. 1943, divorced); Ellen McLaughlin (m. 1963)
- Children: 6

Reginald Rose (December 10, 1920 – April 19, 2002) was an American playwright and screenwriter. He wrote about controversial social and political issues. His realistic approach was particularly influential in the anthology programs of the 1950s.

Rose was born and raised in Manhattan. He was best known for his courtroom drama Twelve Angry Men, exploring the members of a jury in a murder trial. It was adapted for a film of the same name, directed by Sidney Lumet and released in 1957.

== Early life ==
Reginald Rose was born in Manhattan on December 10, 1920, the son of Alice (née Obendorfer) and William Rose, a lawyer. Rose attended Townsend Harris High School and briefly attended City College (now part of the City University of New York). He served in the U.S. Army during World War II, from 1942 to 1946, where he was promoted to first lieutenant.

Rose began trying to write when he was 15 years old and living in Harlem, but he said, "I didn't make it until I was 30." In the interim, he worked as an ad agency's copywriter, a publicist for Warner Bros, a window washer, a clerk, and a counselor at a camp.

== Career ==
=== Television ===
He sold Bus to Nowhere, his first teleplay, in 1951 to the live dramatic anthology program Studio One. They bought his play, Twelve Angry Men, four years later. This latter drama, set entirely in a room where a jury is deliberating the fate of a teenage boy accused of murder, was inspired by Rose's service on a similar trial. The play was later adapted as the 1957 film of the same name, directed by Sidney Lumet.

Rose said about his own jury service: "It was such an impressive, solemn setting in a great big wood-paneled courtroom, with a silver-haired judge, it knocked me out. I was overwhelmed. I was on a jury for a manslaughter case, and we got into this terrific, furious, eight-hour argument in the jury room. I was writing one-hour dramas for Studio One then, and I thought, wow, what a setting for a drama."

Rose received an Emmy for his teleplay Twelve Angry Men and an Oscar nomination for its 1957 feature-length film adaptation. From 1950 to 1960, Rose wrote for all three of the major broadcast networks. In 1961 he created and wrote for The Defenders. The weekly courtroom drama was spun off from one of Rose's episodes of Studio One. The Defenders won two Emmy awards for his dramatic writing.

Rose co-wrote the 1986 TV movie My Two Loves, starring Mariette Hartley and Lynn Redgrave.

=== The Twilight Zone and films ===
His teleplay "The Incredible World of Horace Ford" was the basis for a 1963 episode of the television series The Twilight Zone. It starred Pat Hingle, Nan Martin, and Ruth White. The episode was broadcast on CBS on April 18, 1963, as Episode 15 of Season Four. The theme was how individuals glorify the past by repressing and exercising censorship of the negative aspects: we remember the good while we forget the bad. The teleplay had originally been produced in 1955 as a Studio One episode.

Rose wrote screenplays for many dramas, beginning with Crime in the Streets (1956), an adaptation of his 1955 teleplay for The Elgin Hour. He made four movies with British producer Euan Lloyd: The Wild Geese, The Sea Wolves, Who Dares Wins and Wild Geese II.

== Personal life, death and legacy ==
Rose married Barbara Langbart in 1943, with whom he had four children. After they divorced, he married Ellen McLaughlin (not the playwright and actress) in 1963, with whom he had two children.

Rose died on April 19, 2002, in a Norwalk, Connecticut, hospital, aged 81. The cause of death was complications of heart failure.

Rose's papers are housed in the Wisconsin Historical Society Archives at the Wisconsin Center for Film and Theater Research. The collection includes "variant drafts of scripts, correspondence, clippings, and production information". Films and tape recordings are included in addition to printed documents. Columbia University Libraries also have scripts, "cast lists, shooting schedules, and allied notes and papers" related to The Defenders. The material is housed in the Rare Book and Manuscript Library.

== Filmography ==
=== Film ===
Year	Title	Writer	Producer	Notes
1956	Crime in the Streets	Yes	No	
1957	12 Angry Men	Yes	Yes	
1957	Dino	Yes	No	
1958	Man of the West	Yes	No	
1959	The Man in the Net	Yes	No	
1973	Baxter!	Yes	No	
1978	The Wild Geese	Yes	No	
1978	Somebody Killed Her Husband	Yes	No	
1980	The Sea Wolves	Yes	No	
1981	Whose Life Is It Anyway?	Yes	No	
1982	The Final Option	Yes	No	
1985	Wild Geese II	Yes	No	

=== Television ===
Year	Title	Writer	Creator	Notes
1951	Out There	Yes	No	Wrote episode "The Bus To Nowhere"
1952–1957	Studio One	Yes	No	Wrote 17 episodes
1953	The Revlon Mirror Theater	Yes	No	Wrote episode "The Enormous Radio"
1953–1954	Danger	Yes	No	Wrote 5 episodes
1954	The Elgin Hour	Yes	No	Wrote episode "Crime in the Streets"
1955	Goodyear Playhouse	Yes	No	Wrote episode "The Expendable House"
1955	Three Empty Rooms	Yes	No	Television film
1955	The Challenge	Yes	No	Television film
1956	The Alcoa Hour	Yes	No	Wrote episode "Tragedy in a Temporary Town"
1957	ITV Television Playhouse	Yes	No	Wrote episode "Thunder on Sycamore Street"
1957	Armchair Theatre	Yes	No	Wrote episode "Tragedy in a Temporary Town"
1959	Shell Presents	Yes	No	Wrote episode "Tragedy in a Temporary Town"
1959–1960	Playhouse 90	Yes	No	Wrote episodes "A Quiet Game of Cards", "A Marriage of Strangers" and "The Cruel Day"
1959–1960	Sunday Showcase	Yes	No	Wrote episodes "A Tribute to Eleanor Roosevelt on Her Diamond Jubilee" and "The Sacco-Vanzetti Story"
1960	The General Motors Hour	Yes	No	Wrote episode "Thunder on Sycamore Street"
1960	Encounter	Yes	No	Wrote episodes "Remarkable Incident at Carson Corners" and "The Incredible World of Horace Ford"
1961	The Play of the Week	Yes	No	Wrote episode "Black Monday"
1961	Drama '61	Yes	No	Wrote episode "The Cruel Day"
1961–1965	The Defenders	Yes	Yes	Wrote 132 episodes
1962	A Quiet Game of Cards	Yes	No	Television film
1963	BBC Sunday-Night Play	Yes	No	Wrote episode "The Remarkable Incident at Carson Corners"
1963	Suspense	Yes	No	Wrote episode "Thunder on Sycamore Street"
1963	The Twilight Zone	Yes	No	Wrote episode "The Incredible World of Horace Ford"
1965	Directions	Yes	No	Wrote episode "The Final Ingredient"
1965	Love Story	Yes	No	Wrote episode "A Marriage of Strangers"
1967	Stranger on the Run	Yes	No	Television film
1967	CBS Playhouse	Yes	No	Wrote episode "Dear Friends"
1970	Annie, the Women in the Life of a Man	Yes	No	Television special
1973	Jackanory	Yes	No	Wrote 3 episodes
1974	The Zoo Gang	Yes	Yes	5 episodes
1977	The Four of Us	Yes	No	Television film
1979	Studs Lonigan	Yes	No	Television miniseries
1982	The Rules of Marriage	Yes	No	Television film
1986	My Two Loves	Yes	No	Television film
1987	Escape from Sobibor	Yes	No	Television film

== Awards and nominations ==
Year	Award	Work	Category	Result	Note(s)	Ref.
1955	Primetime Emmy Awards	Twelve Angry Men	Best Written Dramatic Material	Won		
1957	Primetime Emmy Awards	Tragedy in a Temporary Town	Best Teleplay Writing, One Hour or More	Nominated		
1958	Academy Awards	12 Angry Men	Best Writing, Screenplay Based on Material from Another Medium	Nominated		
1958	Academy Awards	12 Angry Men	Best Picture (with Henry Fonda)	Nominated		
1958	Edgar Awards	12 Angry Men	Best Motion Picture Screenplay	Won		
1958	Writers Guild of America Awards	12 Angry Men	Best Written American Drama	Won		
1961	Primetime Emmy Awards	Sacco-Vanzetti Story	Outstanding Writing Achievement in Drama	Nominated		
1962	Primetime Emmy Awards	The Defenders	Outstanding Writing Achievement in Drama	Won		
1963	Primetime Emmy Awards	The Defenders	Outstanding Writing Achievement in Drama (with Robert Thom)	Won		
1968	Primetime Emmy Awards	Dear Friends	Outstanding Writing Achievement in Drama	Nominated		
1979	Edgar Awards	Somebody Killed Her Husband	Best Motion Picture Screenplay	Nominated		
1987	Writers Guild of America Awards	Twelve Angry Men	Laurel Award for TV Writing Achievement	Won		
1987	Primetime Emmy Awards	Escape from Sobibor	Outstanding Writing in a Miniseries or a Special	Nominated		
1988	Writers Guild of America Awards	Escape from Sobibor	Adapted Long Form	Won		
1997	CableACE Awards	12 Angry Men	Writing a Movie or Miniseries	Nominated		

== Plays ==
- The Porcelain Year (1950)
- Black Monday (1962)
- Twelve Angry Men (1964)
- Dear Friends (1968)
- This Agony, This Triumph (1970)
