= Twelve Angry Men (Studio One) =

- Studio One episode
- Episode no.: Season 7 Episode 1
- Directed by: Franklin Schaffner
- Written by: Reginald Rose
- Original air date: September 20, 1954
- Running time: 60 minutes

Guest appearances
- Robert Cummings as Juror #8; Franchot Tone as Juror #3; Edward Arnold as Juror #10; Paul Hartman as Juror #7; John Beal as Juror #2; Walter Abel as Juror #4; Norman Fell as Foreman / Juror No. 1

Episode chronology
← Previous "The Cliff"	Next → "The Education of H*Y*M*A*N K*A*P*L*A*N"

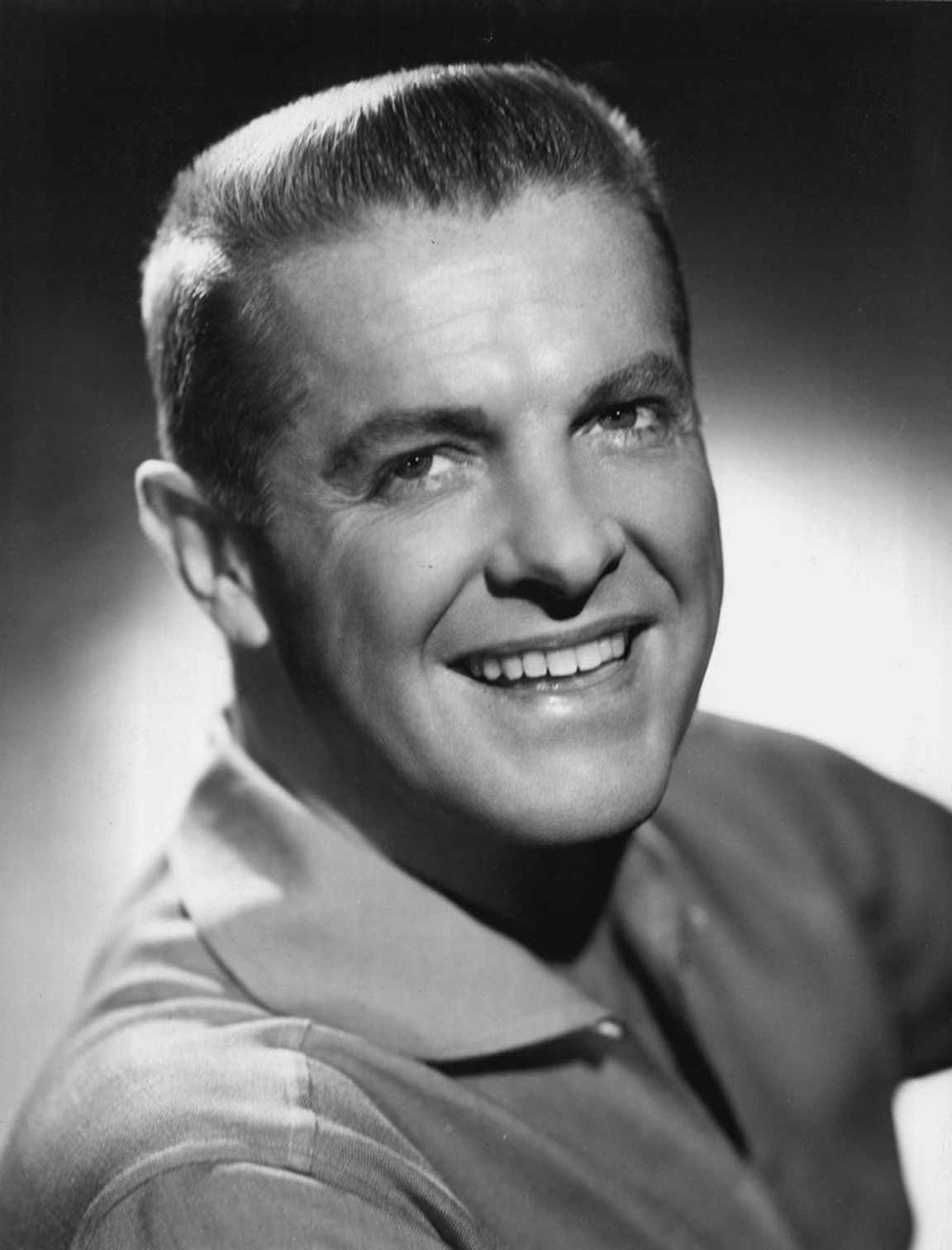
Robert Cummings, the lead actor in "Twelve Angry Men".

"Twelve Angry Men" is a 1954 episode of the American anthology television series Studio One, written by Reginald Rose and directed by Franklin J. Schaffner. It follows the titular twelve members of a jury as they deliberate an apparently clear-cut murder trial, and details the tension among them when one juror argues that the defendant might not be guilty. Staged as a CBS live production on September 20, 1954, the drama garnered three Emmy Awards for Rose's writing, Schaffner's direction, and Robert Cummings' lead performance.

Rose sold the stage rights to the teleplay, which was directly adapted as a 1955 play by Sherman L. Sergel that is still often performed. Rose himself adapted his 1954 teleplay for the feature film 12 Angry Men (1957), and for a 1964 stage version of the film. The story has been the subject of numerous remakes and adaptations in many languages.

== Plot ==
=== Act I ===
The program opens as a judge instructs the jury in a murder case that their verdict must be unanimous. In the jury room, an initial vote is 11 to 1 in favor of guilty. Juror #8 (Robert Cummings) is the lone holdout. Juror #3 (Franchot Tone) questions how Juror #8 could think otherwise after hearing the same evidence he did. #8 replies that he simply wants to talk about it, and not cast his vote lightly due to the likely death sentence.

As per the Foreman's (Norman Fell) suggestion, they go once around the table, each juror having an opportunity to express his point of view. Juror #10 (Edward Arnold) focuses on the neighbor who testified that she saw the defendant stab his father. Juror #7 (Paul Hartman) focuses on the defendant's record – reform school at age 15 for stealing a car, arrested for knife fighting. Juror #4 (Walter Abel) states that the defendants's alibi is flimsy, and that he comes from the slums, which, regrettably, are known breeding grounds for criminals. Juror #5 (Lee Phillips) takes offense and points out that he's lived in a slum his whole life – "maybe it still smells on me."

Juror #8 asks for the alleged murder weapon, a switchblade, to be brought into the jury room. Juror #4 points out that the shopkeeper who sold the knife testified that it was the only one he had in stock, and that it is a very strange knife. In response, Juror #8 pulls an identical knife from his pocket, and reveals he bought it from a junk shop around the corner from the defendant's home, suggesting it is not as unique as the shopkeeper thought.

Juror #8 asks for a secret ballot. If there are still 11 guilty votes, he will accept it and not object anymore. The votes are handed in.

=== Act II ===
The Foreman reads the votes to everyone and, to their surprise, finds that another juror voted “not guilty”. There are now 10 guilty votes. Juror #10 demands to know who it was; Juror #3 believes it was #5 and berates him for it. Juror #9 (Joseph Sweeney) then reveals that he was the one who changed his vote, as he respects Juror #8's courage in taking a lone stand against the others.

Juror #8 focuses on the noise from the elevated train that passed by as the murder took place. One of the witnesses, an old man who lived below the victim's apartment, claimed that he heard the defendant say, "I'm gonna kill you," and then heard the body drop one second later. He questions how the witness could have heard these things with the train roaring by his window. Juror #9 suggests that the old man may have lied to get attention, so he could be important for once in his life. Juror #8 then points out that, regardless, people often say, "I'm gonna kill you," without actually meaning it; Juror #3 thinks this point is ridiculous. Juror #5 changes his vote to not guilty; the vote is now 9–3.

Juror #8 next questions how the old man, who'd been crippled by strokes and walked with two canes, could have gotten out of bed and run through his apartment in time to see the defendant running down the stairs. The old man testified that it took him 15 seconds, something he was positive about. Juror #3 angrily declares that the old man was confused during the trial, so how could he be positive about anything? The room falls silent, as #3 realizes what he has just said. Juror #8 then performs a reenactment to see whether the old man could get to the door that fast. Juror #2 times him with a watch, and reveals the reenactment took 28 seconds. #8 proposes that the old man may not have got to the door in time, and simply assumed that the footsteps he heard were the defendant's. Juror #3 accuses Juror #8 of dishonesty, and insists the defendant must die. When #8 calls #3 a sadist, #3 lunges and declares he'll kill him, proving #8's earlier point.

=== Act III ===
A new vote is taken. It is now 6–6. Juror #2 (John Beal) is troubled by the downward angle of the stab wound, as the defendant was shorter than the victim. Juror #3 shows that it could feasibly be done, but Juror #8 demonstrates how a switchblade is better used underhanded, with upward strikes. Juror #5, having seen knife fights firsthand, confirms this, adding that no one with experience of switchblades would use them overhanded. Juror #7, who has tickets to the evening's theater, changes his vote to speed up deliberations; Juror #11 (George Voskovec) demands that #7 take the case seriously and vote with conviction. Another vote is taken; 9–3 in favor of acquittal. Jurors 3, 4 and 10 are now the holdouts.

Juror #10 goes on a racist tirade, insisting the defendant must be guilty due to how "these people" are. The other jurors turn their backs on #10, until Juror #4 bluntly telling him not to speak again.

Juror #4 is still persuaded by the woman who said she saw the defendant stab his father. Juror #6 (Bart Burns) recalls that the woman wore glasses, and that she wouldn't have worn her glasses to bed, where she was at the time of the killing. Juror #8 proposes that all the woman could have seen, for the instant she looked out the window, was a blur. Juror #3 is left as the only guilty vote, but he finally gives in. The defendant is found not guilty.

== Cast ==
The cast included performances by:

- Robert Cummings as Juror No. 8
- Franchot Tone as Juror No. 3
- Edward Arnold as Juror No. 10
- Paul Hartman as Juror No. 7
- John Beal as Juror No. 2
- Walter Abel as Juror No. 4
- George Voskovec as Juror No. 11
- Joseph Sweeney as Juror No. 9
- Bart Burns as Juror No. 6
- Norman Fell as Foreman (Juror No. 1)
- Lee Phillips as Juror No. 5
- Larkin Ford (credited as Will West) as Juror No. 12

=== Uncredited cast ===
- Vincent Gardenia as Bailiff

Betty Furness presents Westinghouse appliances in breaks after each of the acts.

== Production ==
The production was staged in New York City and aired live on September 20, 1954, as the first episode in the seventh season of the program, Studio One. A kinescope recording was made for rebroadcast later on the west coast.

It was written by Reginald Rose especially for Studio One. Felix Jackson was the producer and Franklin Schaffner the director. Wes Laws was the set decorator, and Willard Levitas provided the settings.

The production won three Emmy Awards: for Rose's writing, Schaffner's direction, and for Robert Cummings as Best Actor.

== Reception ==
The performance received generally positive reviews. In 1997, Steve Rhodes wrote: "Cummings gives the best of several outstanding performances."

== Sources ==
- Cynthia Littleton (April 17, 2003). "Mt&r Finds '54 'Angry Men'". The Hollywood Reporter. Revised link to article retrieved April 23, 2017.
- Rose, Reginald, Twelve Angry Men, teleplay
