= Paul Nickell =

American television director

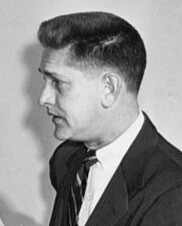
- Born: John Paul Nickell; December 28, 1915; Salt Lick, Kentucky, U.S.
- Died: May 17, 2000 (aged 84); Raleigh, North Carolina, U.S.
- Education: Morehead State University; University of North Carolina
- Occupation: Television director
- Years active: 1948–1968

John Paul Nickell (December 28, 1915 – May 17, 2000) was an American television director.

Nickell was born in Salt Lick, Kentucky. He attended Morehead State University and the University of North Carolina. He started working in television on WPTZ in Philadelphia, moving to New York in 1948 to direct the anthology drama series Studio One. Nickell's other directing credits include Mr. Lucky, The Eleventh Hour, Ben Casey, The Virginian, Naked City, Wide Country, The Donna Reed Show, Sam Benedict, 77 Sunset Strip, The Young Marrieds and Bonanza.

In 1964, Nickell was nominated for a Primetime Emmy Award in the category Outstanding Directing for a Comedy Series for his work on the television program The Farmer's Daughter. His nomination was shared with William D. Russell and Don Taylor. He retired from directing in 1968, and then taught at the University of North Carolina.

Nickell died in May 2000 in Raleigh, North Carolina, at the age of 84.
