= Studio One (American TV series) =

American anthology drama series (1948–1958)

- Also known as: Studio One in Hollywood; Studio One Summer Theatre; Westinghouse Studio One; Westinghouse Summer Theatre.
- Genre: Anthology drama
- Presented by: Art Hannes (announcer); John Cannon (announcer)
- Narrated by: John Cannon
- Theme music composer: Vic Oliver
- Opening theme: "Prelude to the Stars"
- Ending theme: "Prelude to the Star"
- Country of origin: United States
- Original language: English
- No. of seasons: 10
- No. of episodes: 467 (list of episodes)

Production
- Executive producer: Worthington Miner
- Producers: Worthington Miner; Herbert Brodkin
- Running time: 48–50 minutes
- Production company: CBS Productions

Original release
- Network: CBS
- Release: November 7, 1948 – September 29, 1958

Studio One is an American anthology drama television series that was adapted from a radio series. It was created in 1947 by Canadian director Fletcher Markle, who came to CBS from the CBC. It premiered on November 7, 1948, and ended on September 29, 1958, with a total of 467 episodes over the course of 10 seasons.

== History ==
=== Radio ===
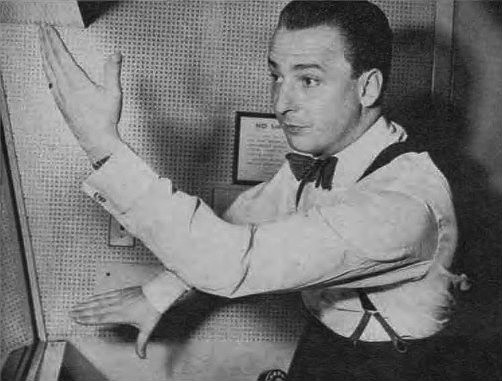
Fletcher Markle directing CBS Radio's Studio One (1948)

On April 29, 1947, Fletcher Markle launched the 60-minute CBS Radio series with an adaptation of Malcolm Lowry's Under the Volcano. Broadcast on Tuesdays opposite Fibber McGee and Molly and The Bob Hope Show at 9:30 pm Eastern Time, the radio series continued until July 27, 1948, showcasing such adaptations as Dodsworth, Pride and Prejudice, The Red Badge of Courage and Ah, Wilderness. Top performers were heard on this series, including John Garfield, Walter Huston, Mercedes McCambridge, Burgess Meredith and Robert Mitchum.

CBS Radio received a Peabody Award for Studio One in 1947, citing Markle's choice of material and the authenticity of his adaptations "in a production, which at its best, is distinguished for its taste, restraint, and radio craftsmanship".

=== Move to television ===
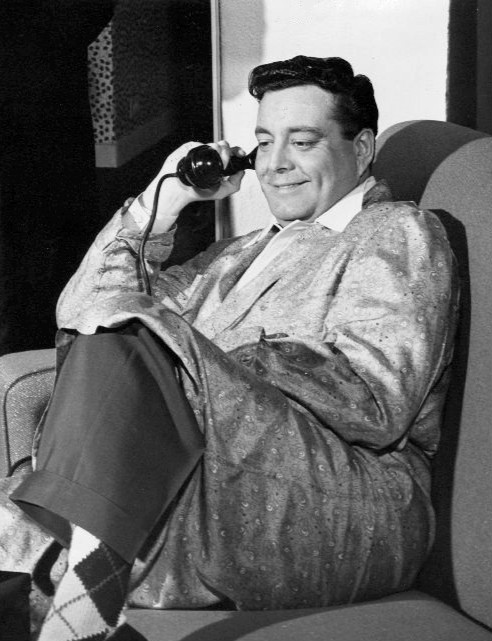
Jackie Gleason in "The Laugh Maker" (1953)

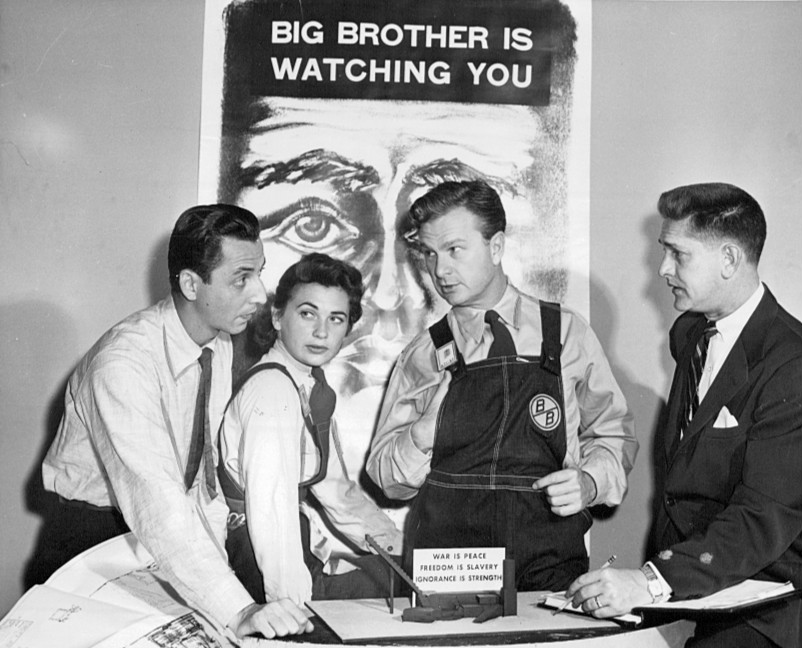
Eddie Albert (third from left) on the set of "1984" (1953), the first screen adaptation George Orwell's novel

Alexander Scourby (right) in "The Night America Trembled" (1957)

In 1948, Markle transitioned from radio to television. Sponsored by Westinghouse Electric Corporation, the television series was seen on CBS (which Westinghouse later owned between 1995 and 2000), from 1948 through 1958, under several variant titles: Studio One Summer Theatre, Studio One in Hollywood, Summer Theatre, Westinghouse Studio One and Westinghouse Summer Theatre. It was telecast in black-and-white only.

Offering a wide range of dramas, Studio One received Emmy nominations every year from 1950 to 1958. The series staged some notable and memorable teleplays among its 467 episodes. Some created such an impact, they were adapted into theatrical films. William Templeton's 1953 adaptation of George Orwell's novel Nineteen Eighty-Four, starring Eddie Albert as Winston Smith, led to the 1956 feature-film version with Edmond O'Brien in the principal role. Reginald Rose's drama "Twelve Angry Men", about the conflicts of jurors deciding a murder case, originated on Studio One on September 20, 1954; and the 1957 motion picture remake with Henry Fonda was nominated for three Academy Awards. Sal Mineo had the title role in the January 2, 1956, episode of Reginald Rose's "Dino", and he reprised the role for the film Dino (1957).

In 1954, "Crime at Blossoms", scripted by Jerome Ross, was given an Edgar Award for Best Episode in a TV Series. Nathaniel Hawthorne's granddaughter received a plaque in recognition of her grandfather's writing achievements during the April 3, 1950, telecast of The Scarlet Letter. "The Night America Trembled" was Studio One's September 9, 1957, top-rated television recreation of Orson Welles' October 30, 1938, radio broadcast of The War of the Worlds. The cast included Alexander Scourby, Ed Asner (credited as Edward Asner) and Vincent Gardenia; James Coburn (credited as Jim Coburn), Warren Beatty and Warren Oates all made their television debuts in bit parts. John Astin appeared uncredited as a reporter.

Another notable presentation was an adaptation in 1952 of a medieval mystery play about the Nativity of Jesus, "The Nativity", based on the Chester and York Mystery Plays of the 14th and 15th centuries, reworked into Elizabethan English. With musical accompaniment by the Robert Shaw Chorale, and presented during the Christmas season of 1952, it was one of the few medieval mystery plays telecast on commercial network television. The cast included Thomas Hardie Chalmers, Miriam Wolfe, Hurd Hatfield and Paul Tripp.

During the 1953 presentation "Dry Run", whole sections of a submarine were built inside the studio, and the entire cast was nearly electrocuted when water that was being used for special effects got very close to power cables.

Worthington Miner, Martin Manulis and others produced. As the official commercial spokeswoman for Westinghouse, Betty Furness became strongly identified with the Westinghouse products she advertised and demonstrated during the commercial breaks, and she was also seen as an actress in eight Studio One dramas. The show's musical directors were Milton C. Anderson, who also created music for Playhouse 90, and Eugene Cines. The show's musical orchestra was also directed in several episodes during the 1950s by Alfredo Antonini.

The show's run ended when Westinghouse switched its sponsorship to the Westinghouse Desilu Playhouse, which premiered in 1958. The series finished at number 24 in the Nielsen ratings for the 1950–1951 season.

== Episodes ==
| Season | Episodes | Originally released | |
| Season | Episodes | First released | Last released |
|---|---|---|---|
| 1 | 20 | November 7, 1948 | June 29, 1949 |
| 2 | 42 | September 12, 1949 | June 26, 1950 |
| 3 | 55 | August 28, 1950 | September 10, 1951 |
| 4 | 51 | September 17, 1951 | September 15, 1952 |
| 5 | 50 | September 22, 1952 | September 14, 1953 |
| 6 | 52 | 1953 | September 13, 1954 |
| 7 | 52 | September 20, 1954 | 1955 |
| 8 | 50 | 1955 | 1956 |
| 9 | 47 | 1956 | 1957 |
| 10 | 48 | September 9, 1957 | September 29, 1958 |

== Critical response ==
An Associated Press review of the episode "Brotherhood of the Bell" said that it adapted a novel "of some substance" into "a totally insubstantial bit" for TV. The episode was the show's first broadcast after it moved from New York to Hollywood. The review called it "a great disappointment after a Studio One fall season in New York which was distinguished by some excellent dramatic offerings".

== Preservation ==
For years, the second half of the original TV production of "Twelve Angry Men" was considered lost. However, in 2003, Joseph Consentino, a researcher-producer for The History Channel, discovered a complete kinescope of the Studio One production in the home of the late New York defense attorney, and later judge, Samuel Leibowitz. Consentino was researching a History Channel documentary about Leibowitz, and the discovery was announced by the Museum of Television & Radio.

The episode "Walk Down the Hill" was digitally preserved by the UCLA Film & Television Archive in collaboration with Paramount Pictures Archive from 16mm kinescope picture and track negative elements and a composite kinescope. Preservation funding was provided by the John H. Mitchell Television Preservation Endowment. The preserved episode screened at the 2024 UCLA Festival of Preservation.

== Home media ==
In 2008, Koch Vision released the Studio One Anthology DVD set with 17 episodes and the original Westinghouse commercials. Bonus features include the "Studio One Seminar" from the Paley Center for Media; an interview with director Paul Nickell, footage from the Archive of American Television and a featurette on the series.

"Twelve Angry Men" is also included as a bonus on the Criterion Collection's DVD and Blu-ray of the 1957 film.

Many episodes are available for viewing at the Paley Centers in New York City and Los Angeles, and some are available from Amazon.com via made-on-demand DVDs of several episodes not included in the Koch Vision Anthology and on Amazon Prime Video.

== Awards and nominations ==
| Year | Result | Emmy Award Category | Recipient |
|---|---|---|---|
| 1950 | Nominated | Best Kinescope Show | – |
| 1951 | Nominated | Best Dramatic Show | – |
| 1952 | Won | Best Dramatic Show | – |
| 1953 | Nominated | Best Dramatic Show | – |
| 1954 | Nominated | Best Dramatic Show | – |
| 1955 | Nominated | Best Individual Program of the Year | – |
| 1955 | Nominated | Best Dramatic Show | – |
| 1955 | Won | Best Written Dramatic Material | Reginald Rose (For "Twelve Angry Men") |
| 1955 | Won | Best Direction | Franklin J. Schaffner (For "Twelve Angry Men") |
| 1955 | Won | Best Actor in a Single Performance | Robert Cummings (For "Twelve Angry Men") |
| 1956 | Nominated | Best Dramatic Series | – |
| 1956 | Won | Best Camerawork – Live Show | T. Miller |
| 1957 | Nominated | Best Single Performance by an Actress | Nancy Kelly (For "The Pilot") |
| 1957 | Nominated | Best Single Performance by an Actor | Sal Mineo (For "Dino") |
| 1958 | Nominated | Best Teleplay Writing – One Hour or More | Arthur Hailey (For "No Deadly Medicine") |
| 1958 | Nominated | Best Dramatic Anthology Series | – |
| 1958 | Nominated | Actress – Best Single Performance – Lead or Support | Piper Laurie (For "The Deaf Heart") |
| 1958 | Nominated | Actor – Best Single Performance – Lead or Support | Lee J. Cobb (For "No Deadly Medicine") |
