= Chaim Towber =

Actor and playwright in Yiddish theater

- חיים שמואל טויבער
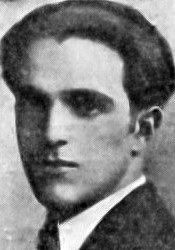
- Born: Chaim-Shmil Toyber; June 14, 1901; Mohyliv-Podilskyi
- Died: February 26, 1972 (aged 70); New York City
- Citizenship: Russian Empire; United States
- Occupations: actor, playwright, musician
- Years active: 1910 - 1941

Chaim Shmuel Towber (Tauber, Toyber, Yiddish: חיים שמואל טויבער, June 14, 1901, Mohyliv-Podilskyi — February 26, 1972, New York City) was an American and Canadian actor of Jewish-Ukrainian descent, best known as the author of the song "I Love You So Much" (Yiddish: Ikh Hob Dikh Tsu Fil Lib).

== Biography ==
=== Early life ===
Chaim Towber was born on June 14, 1901, in the town of Mohyliv-Podilskyi (Yiddish name Molev) into a family of a poor tailor. He received education in a cheder and later attended a commercial school.

At the age of nine, Chaim made his debut in a family production of Abraham Goldfaden's play Doctor Almasaro. In the spring of 1917, he participated in the establishment of the Molev-Podilskyi society Di yidishe bine (Yiddish: The Jewish Stage) under the direction of Borukh Mozshvits, and on May 12 of the same year, he played the role of Shemay in Jacob Gordin's play The Jewish King Lear. He later became the director of this society. Under his leadership, actors who eventually formed the Mohyliv troupe toured villages and towns in the Podolia and Kyiv Governorates, acquiring "invaluable experience" in lieu of monetary compensation. Peasants used food to pay for admission to the performances.

=== In Bessarabia ===
In 1919, Towber joined a professional troupe led by Lev Meyerson and Grisha Epstein. To escape from pogroms, Chaim, along with the troupe, moved to Romania, where he, along with other refugees from various parts of the Russian Empire, formed a new theatrical collective. In the summer of 1921, he obtained a temporary engagement at the Jignitsa Theater in Bucharest, directed by Itsikl Goldberberg. From 1922, he performed in Bucharest and other Romanian cities.

During his time in Bessarabia, Towber created his first one-act plays, Bloody Hanukkah and Thorny Path, and performed in them. At the same time, he wrote his three-act dramatic work, Glut, and engaged in translating Russian plays into Yiddish. His last work in Romania was a role in the production of I. L. Peretz's Three Gifts.

=== In America ===
In 1925, Towber moved to Montreal, Canada, where he joined the theatrical troupe of Isidor Hollander, touring small towns across America. In 1928–1929, Towber worked at the Casino Theater in Philadelphia, where he staged his plays Galician Rabbi and Golden Rings to the music of Reuben Osofsky. The play Golden Ring was also staged in 1930 in New York's National Theatre by Mikhal Michalesko, set to the music of Alexander Olshanetsky.

In the theatrical season of the 1929-30s, he worked at the Liberty theater in Brooklyn. In the following season, he rejoined Hollander's troupe in Toronto. In 1931, Towber became a member of the Hebrew Actors' Union. During the 1931–33s, he played in various theater groups in Detroit, Philadelphia, and Boston.

In 1934, in collaboration with William Siegel, Towber wrote the script for the musical show Happy Family, which premiered at the Public Theater in New York. The music was composed by Sholom Secunda.

=== Ikh Hob Dikh Tsu Fil Lib ===
The 1933–34 season was successful for Chaim Towber. The premiere of the operetta Der Katerinshtshik (The Organ-grinder) by Alexander Olshanetsky took place on the stage of the Second Avenue Theater in New York. The main roles in the play were played by Julius Nathanson, Annie Thomashefsky (Boris Thomashefsky's sister) and Luba Kadison. Kadison became the first performer of the famous song written by Towber, "Ikh Hob Dikh Tsu Fil Lib" ("I Love You So Much"). Luba Kadison's performance was praised for "taste and restraint, clearly absent in other productions of the Theater on Second Avenue." In the subsequent years, the song experienced significant popularity among Jewish artists and transcended its initial theatrical context, gaining recognition beyond the Jewish community.

== Work in Cinema ==
Starting in 1939, Towber began working in cinema. Initially, he appeared in episodes of the films Kol Nidre and Big Shot. In 1940, he wrote screenplays and lyrics for songs for musical comedies with the music of Sholom Secunda: My House, Der Yiddisher Nigun (The Jewish Melody), Motl the Operator. In the latter, Towber played the leading role. All these films were directed by Joseph Seiden. Towber played his last role in 1941 in the film "Mazl Tov, Jews!" by the same director.

Chaim Towber died in 1972.
