= Ikh Hob Dikh Tsu Fil Lib =

Yiddish song by Alexander Olshanetsky and Chaim Tauber

"Ikh Hob Dikh Tsu Fil Lib (Yiddish original)"
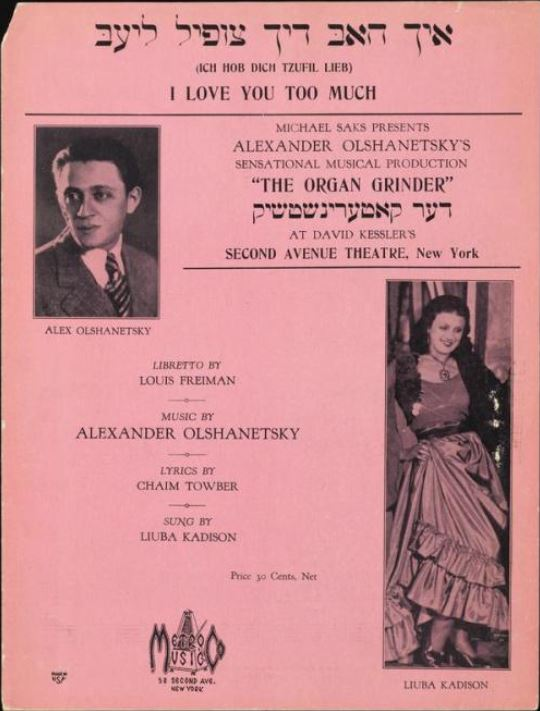
- Alexander Olshanetsky and Luba Kadison on the sheet music cover

Song
- Language: Yiddish
- Written: 1933
- Genre: tango
- Composer: Alexander Olshanetsky
- Lyricist: Chaim Towber

"I love you much too much (English version)"

Song
- Language: English
- Written: 1940
- Composer: Alexander Olshanetsky
- Lyricist: Don Raye

"Ikh Hob Dikh Tsu Fil Lib" (Yiddish: איך האָב דיך צו פֿיל ליב, "I love you so much") is one of the most popular love songs written in Yiddish.

== History ==
The musical piece "Ich hob dikh tsu fil lib" was written by composer Alexander Olshanetsky and lyricist Chaim Towber for the musical comedy Der Katerinshtshik (The Organ-grinder). The play premiered during the 1933-1934 theatrical season at David Kessler's Second Avenue Theater. The troupe was struggling financially, and the producers tried to rely on an entertainment production, in the words of one critic, "a return to the good old hokum", that would avoid financial risk in the event of a more serious Yiddish drama.

The Organ-Grinder opened with a star cast, which included Julius Nathanson, Annie Tomashevsky (Boris Tomashevsky's sister) and Luba Kadison, who performed this song in the play. Kadison was known for her performance in serious classical Yiddish productions, and this was her first time in a musical performance.

== Plot ==
The plot of the play revolves around Tsirele, the daughter of a widow and innkeeper from a small Polish town, and Abrasha, a Gypsy organ-grinder, street beggar and pickpocket, whose mystery nevertheless attracts many women. His parents - also organ grinders from the Gypsy camp - are perceived by the townspeople as "thieves from lower society." Tsirele and Abrasha are sincerely in love and intend to get married, despite the strong objections of Tsirele's family and Rabbi Makarover. Her mother, Rivke, chose another party for her daughter - Pinya. Rivka turns to Masha, a Gypsy fortune teller, to predict Tsirele's future. It so happened that Masha is very fond of Abrasha, with whom, apparently, she once had some kind of romantic relationship. Masha wonders about her own fate and, upon learning that Abrasha is going to marry Tsirele, she pours out her heart in this pitiful song - Ikh hob dikh tsu fil lib. In the song, Masha expresses her grief, while unselfishly wishing Abrasha happiness: "I love you too much to be angry with you." With tears in her eyes, she promises Abrasha her blessing, not the stereotypical Gypsy curse.

Luba Kadison, who has been associated with this song for many years, later stated that she inspired the authors of this song to give it its current form and role in the play. She called the song "a melody of hearts and flowers" and objected that the song does not reveal Masha's character and does not contribute to the development of the plot. According to Kadison, it was she who insisted that the song be rewritten so that it would appear naturally during the fortune-telling on the cards. And she claimed that it was she who suggested that the song should contain heartache and an expression of painful acceptance of fate.

While Tsirele and Abrasha are going to go to the wedding chuppah (canopy) without the consent of her mother, messengers arrive from another town to reveal that the organ-grinders are not Abrasha's real parents, and that Abrasha is not a Gypsy, but a Jew who was kidnapped in infancy and raised as their own son in a Gypsy camp. It turned out that Abrasha has a rich Jewish ancestry, he is the grandson of Rabbi Makarover, whose own late daughter - Abrasha's mother - married a doctor against his will and incurred his condemnation.

Abrasha obeys the request of the rabbi and returns to the family. Ultimately, Rivka gives in, as does Rabbi Makarover, who appeared on time at the wedding without an invitation, this time in order to bless, not curse, the alliance he opposed, and even recognize its divine origin.

== Reception ==
The performance's music was greeted with enthusiasm by critics, and the play was crushed due to lack of plot and implausibility. The music was called "a classic that would fit the best Viennese operetta, and a pearl of the Jewish scene." Ikh hob dikh tsu fil lib was praised for its freshness of form and novelty, and Luba Kadison's performance was praised for "taste and restraint, clearly absent in other productions of the Theater on Second Avenue." Over the next few years, the song gained immense popularity among Jewish artists and completely broke away from its original theatrical context.

== In other languages ==
In 1940, Bob Zurke and his Delta Rhythm Orchestra recorded the English version, I Love You Much Too Much, and achieved recognition in the non-Jewish world. Featuring English lyrics by Don Raye, the song has been recorded by numerous performers in a variety of styles, including Gene Krupa, Ella Fitzgerald, The Andrews Sisters, The Barry Sisters, Connie Francis, Dean Martin, Tamara Gverdtsiteli. In 1981, Carlos Santana's instrumental version of the song made its way onto the Rock & Roll Top 40 charts.

The song was performed in the Russian TV series "The Life and Adventures of Mishka Yaponchik".
