= Vilna Troupe =

The Vilna Troupe (Yiddish: Vilner trupe ווילנער טרופע; Lithuanian: Vilniaus trupė; Polish: Trupa Wileńska; Romanian: Trupa din Vilna), also known as Fareyn Fun Yiddishe Dramatishe Artistn (Federation of Yiddish Dramatic Actors) and later Dramă şi Comedie, was an international and mostly Yiddish-speaking theatre, one of the most famous in the history of Yiddish theater. It was formed in and named after the city of Vilnius (Vilna) in the Russian Empire, later capital city of Lithuania. Distinctly Modernist, and strongly influenced by Russian literature and by the ideas of Konstantin Stanislavski, their travels in Western Europe and later to Romania played a significant role in the dissemination of a disciplined approach to acting that continues to be influential in the present day.

== Early years ==
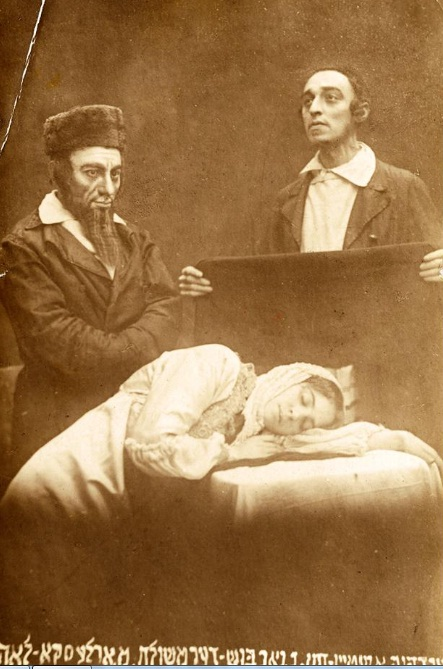
Vilna Troupe plays "Der dibek" (The Dybbuk), Poland, 1920s

Founded in 1915 or 1916 during World War I, the troupe began with the deserted Vilna State Theatre as their base, toured Kovno, Białystok and Grodno, and soon moved to Warsaw. Their repertoire epitomized the second golden age of Yiddish theater, with works by S. An-sky, Sholem Aleichem and Sholem Asch, as well as Molière, Maxim Gorky, Henrik Ibsen, plus some Jewish-themed plays by non-Jews, notably Karl Gutzkow's Uriel Acosta. Their uniform Lithuanian Yiddish stood in contrast to the mix of dialects often heard in Yiddish theater at the time.

They were the first to stage An-sky's The Dybbuk. Early versions of the play were written variously in Russian and Yiddish, but Russian director and method acting pioneer Stanislavski (who first encountered the work in Russian) made several suggestions to An-sky. One of these was that for the sake of authenticity the piece should be in Yiddish. Stanislavski's death prevented the play from being produced at the Moscow Art Theater. At the time of An-sky's death, on November 8, 1920, the play was complete but had never been professionally produced. As a tribute to An-sky, the Vilna troupe, under the direction of David Herman, utilised the 30-day period of mourning after his death to prepare the play, which opened December 9, 1920, at the Elysium Theatre in Warsaw. Its unanticipated success established the play as a classic of modern Yiddish theater.

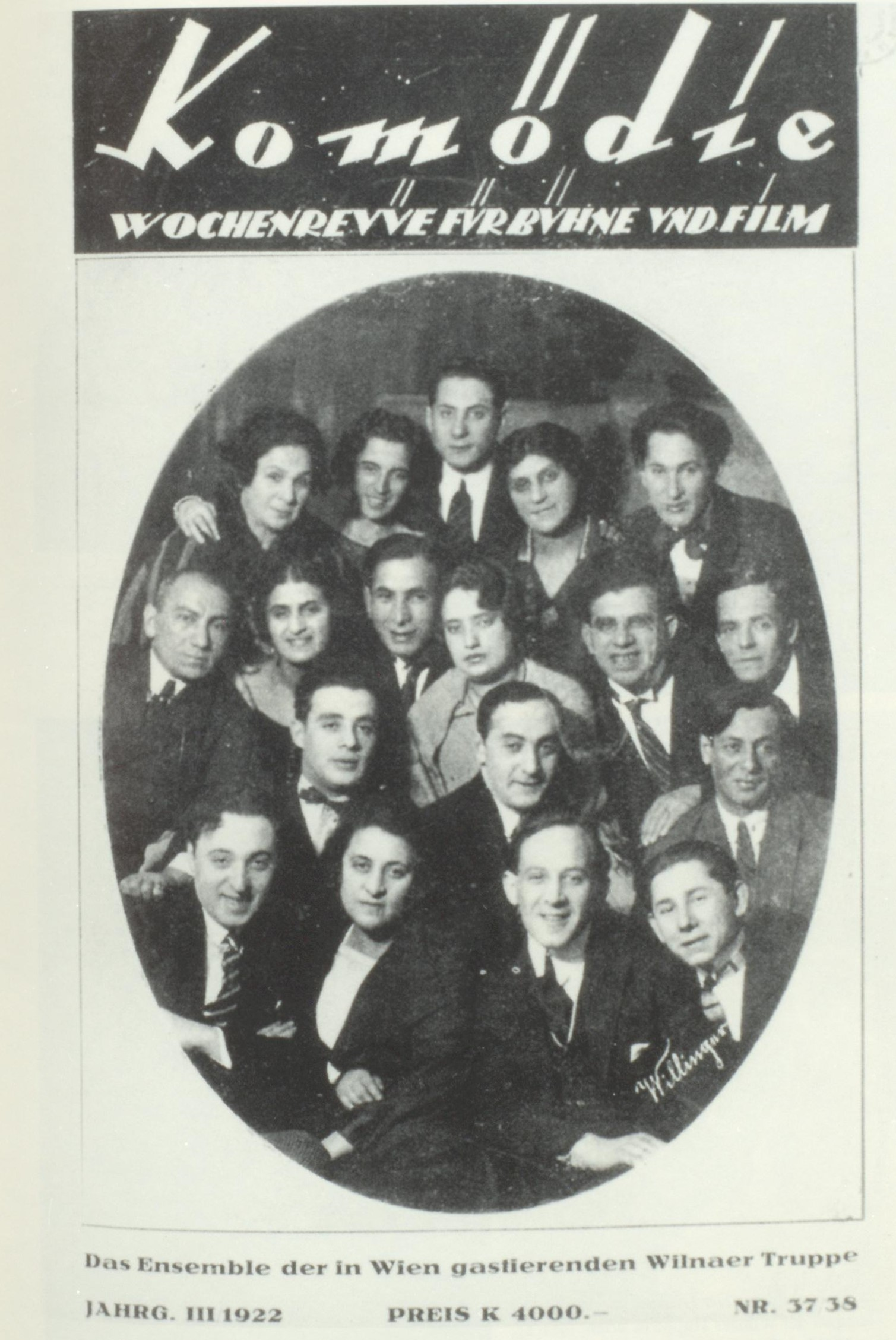
Vilna Troupe in 1922

They toured extensively; they played in New York City, London and Paris. Their 1923 London production of Sholem Asch's The God of Vengeance at the Pavilion Theatre, Whitechapel was shut down by the censor (who had originally passed it based on an English-language synopsis). The play includes a portrayal of a lesbian relationship, which is the most favorably portrayed relationship in what is otherwise dark play. Among the members of the troupe was Joseph Green, later a Yiddish-language filmmaker.

== Bucharest ==
In 1923, the Vilna troupe came to Bucharest at the invitation of Isidor Goldenberg of the Jigniţa Summer Theater. At the time, the troupe included actresses Hanna Braz, Luba Kadison, Helena Gotlib, Judith Lares, Hanna Mogel, and Miriam Orleska, and actors Alexander Stein, Joseph Buloff, Aizik Samberg, Joseph Kamen, Jacob Waislitz, Leib Kadison, Shmuel Sheftel, Benjamin Ehrenkrantz and Chaim Brakarz. The director of the company was Mordechai Mazo. Author, businessman and Zionist activist A. L. Zissu was instrumental in helping the transition and was reportedly the company's main financial backer after 1923. Zissu was the brother-in-law of the Romanian poet Tudor Arghezi.

According to playwright and cultural promoter Israil Bercovici, their disciplined approach to theater impacted not only Romanian Yiddish theater but Romanian theater generally. Their audience went beyond the usual attendees of Yiddish theater: they drew the attention of the Romanian-language press, the Romanian theater world, and of "men of culture" generally. An August 23, 1924 article in the daily newspaper Adevărul noted: "Such a demonstration of artistry, even on a small stage such as Jigniţa and even in a language like Yiddish ought to be seen by all who are interested in superior realization of drama." Romanian literary critic Paul Cernat argues that the Vilna Troupe acted as a ferment for the local avant-garde, Expressionist environment, and by extension, for cutting edge Romanian literature. Cernat noted that while most Romanian avant-garde shows were "simple playful curiosities", "expressionist aesthetics were not without consequences on the [new Romanian] theatrical texts".

In Cernat's view, the Vilna Troupe accomplished this in tandem with various local companies and promoters. Among the latter, he cites Zissu, Benjamin Fondane, Ion Marin Sadoveanu, Armand Pascal, Sandu Eliad, Scarlat Callimachi, Dida Solomon, George Ciprian and various authors affiliated with Contimporanul magazine. Citing cultural historian Ovid Crohmălniceanu, Cernat also concludes that the branch of Expressionism favored by the company followed a distinct path, having its roots in Hasidic Judaism.

The Vilna Troupe was instantly made notorious by its staging of The Deluge, a work by Swedish-born dramatist Henning Berger, which was positively reviewed by the prominent literary magazine Rampa. The Deluge was a headliner by the company, until it was replaced by Maxim Gorky's The Lower Depths (August 1924) The artistic praise did not pay the bills, and touring elsewhere in Romania only made the financial picture worse. According to modernist author Mihail Sebastian, the actors' commitment and the quality of the shows contrasted heavily with the venues they were touring. Sebastian referred to one of the latter as "once destined for Jewish pornography", and recounted how news of the Vilna Troupe "miracle" had spread by word of mouth. The situation was aggravated when the actors had to take a break from performing at the Jigniţa, following the death of its female owner, Sofia Lieblich. During that period, several actors left their temporary home in Romania, most of them settling in the United States.

Their fortunes were salvaged by a 1925 production of Osip Dymov's Der zinger fun zayn troyer ("The Singer of His Sorrow"), created in collaboration with Jacob Sternberg's troupe. The production was another critical success: writer Victor Eftimiu called it "a model of stylized realist theater", while dramatist Ion Marin Sadoveanu argued that it was comparable to "the best scenes" produced in France by the acclaimed director Jacques Copeau. It was an unprecedented hit, and ran at length at Bucharest's Central Theater. On their 40th show with the play, the actors were rewarded with portraits specially drawn by caricaturist Jacques Kapralik. The company was by then also being reviewed by the modernist platform Integral, and especially by its two main columnists, Ion Călugăru and M. H. Maxy, both of whom later chose to become directly involved in its activities. Their initiative followed their dissatisfaction with the choice of Der zinger fun zayn troyer and in particular with Joseph Buloff's directing: the magazine accused Buloff of having "abused color in order to complete a null text." For a while, Călugăru replaced Mazo as director of the troupe, while Maxy provided the scenic design for several productions.

The positive reception indirectly helped establish close cultural connections between the newly-emancipated Jewish-Romanian community and sections of the ethnic Romanian majority. Cernat notes that this was in glaring contrast to a parallel phenomenon, "the recrudescence of antisemitic manifestations, particularly among the students". Solidarity with the company and the Jewish community at large was notably expressed by left-wingers such as Arghezi, Gala Galaction, N. D. Cocea and Contimporanul editor Ion Vinea.

In an article for the leftist magazine Lupta, Victor Eftimiu also expressed his opinion that the cultural renaissance heralded by the Troupe could enforce cultural patriotism and nationalism among Romanian Jews, and thus make "Jewishness" prove itself more worthy than "the braggadocios" of other nationalist discourses. Writing in the Warsaw Yiddish-language Literarishe Bleter during the run of Der zinger fun zayn troyer, Joseph Buloff was amazed at the positive reception that Yiddish theater received among the gentiles of Bucharest. Buloff noted that the Romanian actor Tanţi Cutava was equally comfortable acting in French and Yiddish as in his native Romanian, that he often heard ethnic Romanians singing songs from the Yiddish theater over a glass of wine, and that Romanian writers and artists invited Yiddish actors to their get-togethers, all of which apparently formed a stark contrast to Warsaw at that time. Following the November 1924 establishment of an Amicii teatrului evreiesc (Friends of the Jewish Theatre) association designed to help the troupe recover from its financial slump, several such clubs were set up by Jews and non-Jews in various Romanian localities.

The company also registered success when, in late 1925, it decided to reinstate The Deluge as its headliner. Apparently, the production was the work of several directors, and underwent significant changes from one staging to another, in both direction and assignment of roles. It earned further praise from critics, especially after Luba Kadison replaced Orleska in the play's sole female role. (Buloff and Leib Kadison, who had been assigned the title roles in the original variant, had by then withdrawn.) Der zinger fun zayn troyer and The Deluge were followed by successful Bucharest productions of David Pinsky's Melech David un zaine Froien (King David and His Women) and Tolstoy's The Living Corpse. Pressured, in part, by a 32% tax on performances by foreign troupes, by the end of 1925, the troupe had decided to reconstitute themselves as a Bucharest-based troupe, taking the Romanian-language name Dramă şi Comedie.

== Dramă şi Comedie ==
"The wandering troupe from Vilna will stay put... after an era of prolonged touring", reported Integral. "They will fix on a program, which will no longer oscillate between melodrama and an expressionist mural. Apparently, the prospect launched today is precise: a new group tending to go along the route of modern innovation. 'No compromise with lack of taste—no compromise with bad taste': a shout that justifies an existence and would be worthy of realization."

The "no compromise" slogan came from the statement of program, really more of an artistic manifesto, with which the reconstituted group launched itself. The same document also declared the troupe's intent "to offer the masses and intellectuals simultaneously an institution of culture". The new troupe included such actors as Braz, Kadison, Lares, Orleska, Stein, Buloff, Kamen, Waislitz, Sheftel, and the Kadisons from the 1923 roster, plus Noemi Nathan, Yokheved Waislitz, Jehuda Ehrenkranz, Samuel Iris, Simkhe Natan, Sholom Schönbaum, Henry Tarlo, and Simi Weinstock.

However, Dramă şi Comedie would play only one full season of theater (1925–26), with some remnants struggling on another year. Their productions, beginning with Alter Kacyzne's Der dukus ("The Duke") and including Nikolai Gogol's Marriage, were critically acclaimed, but never matched the commercial success of Der zinger fun zayn troyer. Directed by Sternberg, and endorsed by writers Arghezi, Felix Aderca and Alfred Hefter-Hidalgo, the Marriage production was also at the center of a dispute in the literary community, due to its innovative aesthetics. Integral reacted when some spoke of it as an example of the constructivist "pure theatre" guidelines theorized by Contimporanul, and instead explained it as an example of "synthetic" theatre.

During that period, the staging of Ger tzedek was criticized by Contimporanul chronicler Sergiu Milorian, who saw in it proof that traditional "Yiddishist" plays were "unperformable", while arguing that the contribution of painter Arthur Kolnik in "the science" of scenic design was the show's only merit. After the sudden and unexpected death of actress Judith Lares, director Mazo left for Warsaw, and then Vilna. The troupe continued briefly with Luigi Pirandello's Man, Beast, and Virtue in the 1926–27 season.

== Return to Poland ==
After the financial failure of the society that supported Dramă şi Comedie, the troupe returned to calling itself the Vilna Troupe, continuing at first in Bucharest, where Joseph Buloff directed his adaptation of "Shabtsi Tsvi" (Sabbatai Zevi; based on Sholem Asch's play of the same title and Jerzy Żuławski's The End of the Messiah), and then embarking on a tour of the Romanian provinces. In mid 1926 Buloff and Luba Kadison left the troupe and, at the invitation of Maurice Schwartz, emigrated to the United States, where they joined Schwartz's Yiddish Art Theatre in New York. The rest of the troupe returned to Bucharest, and then went to Cernăuți (Czernowitz; Chernivtsi), where A. Stein directed a production of Leonid Andreyev's play "Der gedank" (Thought).

Shortly later Stein and other members left the troupe, and the remaining members returned to Poland, where they first toured the Galician provinces, then settled for a time in Lwów (Lemberg; Lviv, Ukraine), in 1927. The troupe at this time consisted of Miriam Orleska, Chava Eisen, Chaim Brakarz, David Herman, Rachel Holzer, Haber, Jacob and Yokheved Waislitz, Simkhe Weinstock, M. Mazo, Abraham Morewski, Naomi and Simkhe Nathan, Joseph Kamen, and Nadia Kareni. In Lwów David Herman staged and directed Jacob Preger's Der nisoyen (The Temptation), in August 1927; and in October, "Yehudis un Holofernes", a Yiddish adaptation of Friedrich Hebbel's Judith.

The troupe then traveled to Kraków, and finally to Warsaw, where they began performing at the Elysium Theater on 22 March 1928, with the following actors: Miriam Orleska, Dovid Birnboym, Helena Gotlib, Esther Goldenberg, Zalmen Hirshfeld, Jacob Waislitz, Ruth Taru, David Licht, Yankev Mansdorf, Naomi and Simkhe Nathan, A. Samberg, Joseph Kamen and Dina Koenig (Kamen), Yankev Kurlender, Batsheva Kremer, Esther Rappel, Perl Ruth, and Shmuel Sheftel. In May 1928 Michael Weichert staged and directed an epic production of Sholem Asch's Kidesh hashem, with set designs by Władysław Weintraub and music by Henech Kon; hugely popular with audiences, it was performed about 250 times. In October of the same year, David Herman staged and directed I. L. Peretz's Bay nakht afn altn mark (At Night in the Old Marketplace), with stage design by Weintraub, music by Joseph Kaminski, and choreography by Leah Rotbaum.

== Later years ==
There were several later revivals of the Vilna Troupe in New York City. The first of these was a revival of The Dybbuk at the Grand Theater in April 1926. In late summer 1926 they were at the Liptzin Theater performing Rasputin and the Czarina.

In March 1929, they were playing Chone Gottesfeld's Parnose ("Business") in The Bronx, New York. The production moved in May to the Yiddish Folks Theater at Second Avenue and East 12th Street, near the center of New York's main Yiddish Theater District of the time. Director Jakob Rotbaum began his professional career staging Eugene O'Neill's works with the troupe in 1930.

Shows continued to be produced in Bucharest under the Vilna Troupe name even after 1927. Following the breakup of Dramă şi Comedie, a play The Flood was put on at the Baraşeum theater, which was loosely the story of the Vilna troupe. In a March 1929 article for Cuvântul newspaper, Mihail Sebastian announced that the company was returning to Bucharest. In early 1930, company actors also staged Peretz's A Night in the Old Marketplace, later described by Crohmălniceanu as one of the "memorable dates in the history of European Yiddish theater", alongside 1925's Der zinger fun zayn troyer. The production, directed by Sternberg, was the subject of a "literary trial" in the intellectual community: Sternberg's radical modernist approach was scrutinized by the more reserved authors Camil Petrescu and Barbu Lăzăreanu, but their accusations were denied merit by a pro-avant-garde group comprising Maxy, Sandu Tudor and Ilarie Voronca. References to the troupe and its role were also present in Maxy's overview of modernist performances in Romania, published by unu magazine in February 1931.

In January of the following year, the fate of the company was also discussed by Sebastian, in his column for Cuvântul. The writer, who had followed the Vilna Troupe's activities over the previous decade, was reviewing Joseph Kamen's return to the Romanian stage with another group of actors. Remembering his impression of the original troupe's shows, Sebastian spoke of its "melancholic destiny": "ever since then, death, dissipation and perhaps fatigue have passed through all these things. [J]udith Lares, who sleeps her eternal sleep in some town in Transylvania. [Buloff], who confronts an infamous public in America. Stein, lost in some place I don't recall."

The company disbanded again in 1931. Still, several members of the troupe continued on occasion to perform together in the United States. In September 1936, Sonia Alomis, Alexander Asro and Noah Nachbush performed a program of short pieces at the New School for Social Research, which The New York Times said "remind[ed] us that they are still an active force in [Jewish] theater." Among the plays performed were Sholem Aleichem's Kapores, Mikhail Artsybashev's one-act Jealousy, Der Tunkeler's Should I Marry, or Shouldn't I?, and Veviorke's A Philosopher—A Drunkard. Several members of the troupe participated in a 1937 New York revival of The Dybbuk, directed again by David Herman.

The Vilna Troupe's success with The Deluge had made various Romanian intellectuals seek to preserve the text in a Romanian-language translation. This was first attempted in 1928 by an author named Iosif Vanciu, but its staging by the National Theatre Cluj received bad reviews. During the final stages of World War II, following the 1944 Romanian coup d'état, the project was resumed by Baraşeum and Sebastian, resulting in a loose adaptation based not on Berger's original, but on the text as performed by the Vilna Troupe. In his stage program for the play, Sebastian offered additional praise to his predecessors, but noted that, although "excellent", the Vilna Troupe's text had to be adapted for being too "sketchy".

== Members ==
- Sonia Alomis (alternatively Alumes)
- Alexander Asro (also spelled Aleksandr Azro)
- Jacob Bleifer
- Joseph Buloff
- Moses Feder
- Jacob Gertner
- Joseph Green (originally surnamed Greenberg)
- Hertz Grosbard
- David Herman (director)
- Leib Kadison
- Luba Kadison
- Joseph Kamen
- Matus Kowalski
- Jacob Lubotsky
- Mordechai Mazo
- Abraham Morewski
- Noah Nachbush
- Lea Naomi
- Miriam Orleska
- Chaim Shneier (also known as Chaim Hamerow)
- Eliosha Stein
- Sholem Tanin
- Tarlo
- Abraham Teitelbaum
- Miriam Veide
- Freda Vitalin
- Pola Walter
