= The Jumping-Off Place =

Novel by Marian Hurd McNeely

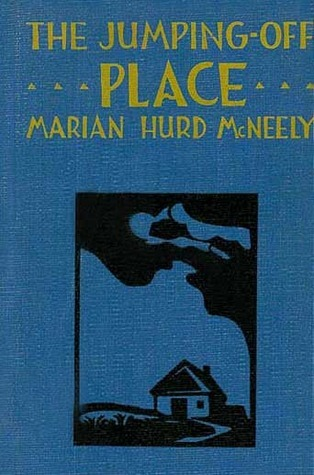
- Author: Marian Hurd McNeely
- Illustrator: William Siegel
- Language: English
- Genre: Children's literature
- Publisher: Longmans, Green and Co.
- Publication date: 1929
- Publication place: United States
- Pages: 308

The Jumping-Off Place is a 1929 children's novel written by Marian Hurd McNeely and illustrated by William Siegel. Set on the Dakota prairie in the early 1900s, it follows the Linville children as they move from Wisconsin to South Dakota to live on their recently deceased uncle's homestead claim on the Rosebud Indian Reservation; it is based on the author's own life homesteading in South Dakota. The novel earned a Newbery Honor in 1930.

== Plot ==
The four orphaned Linville children - Becky, Dick, Phil, and Joan - move to South Dakota in 1910 to "prove up" on a homestead claim originally filed by their uncle Jim, who raised them and who died suddenly just before the story starts. They deal with unexpected expenses, unpleasant neighbors, claim jumpers, bad weather, and other problems, but eventually triumph over them all and gain the respect and friendship of the nearby town's inhabitants. Though they had originally intended to sell or rent the claim once they owned it, they decide at the end of the book to stay in South Dakota, having come to love the prairie.
