= Luba Kadison =

Lithuanian actress (1906–2006)

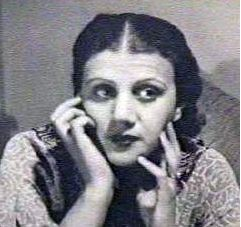
- Born: 13 December 1906
- Died: 4 May 2006 (aged 99)
- Occupation: Actress
- Spouse: Joseph Buloff

Luba Kadison Buloff (December 13, 1906 – May 4, 2006) was a Lithuanian Jewish actress, active for decades in Yiddish theatre, in both Europe and the United States.

== Early life ==
Luba Kadison was born in Kovno, Lithuania. She moved with her family to Vilna during World War I, and then to Warsaw while she was still in her teens. Her father, Leib Kadison, was a co-founder of the Vilna Troupe. From a young age, Luba Kadison was playing juvenile roles with the Vilna Troupe, and moved into female leads as she grew. While attending a drama school (her only formal education), she played a small role in the 1920 premiere of S. Ansky's The Dybbuk.

== Career ==
With the Vilna Troupe, Luba Kadison played the bride (the female lead) in The Dybbuk, and starred in Ossip Dimov's Yoshke Muzicant (directed by her future husband Joseph Buloff). Yoshke Muzicant was a major success in Bucharest, drawing the attention of Maurice Schwartz; Kadison and Buloff moved to the United States in 1927, both to work with Schwartz at the Yiddish Art Theater in New York City. Both were fixtures in the Yiddish theatre scene in New York for many years after they arrived. They performed in South American tours in 1933 and 1940. She played the wife in a 1951 Yiddish adaptation of Death of a Salesman. In 1954, she had a leading role in the Yiddish musical Wish Me Luck!

In 1962, Luba Kadison and Helen Waren adapted three stories by Anton Chekhov for English performance. In 1970 Kadison adapted Singer's The Brothers Ashkenazi, for a production starring and directed by her husband Joseph Buloff. The New York Times reviewer judged her adaptation pleasing, saying "Miss Kadison's Yiddish lines are flavorsome and supple." Luba Buloff also worked as a translator, and taught acting.

In 1992, her memoirs written with Joseph Buloff, On Stage, Off Stage, was published.

== Ikh Hob Dikh Tsu Fil Lib ==
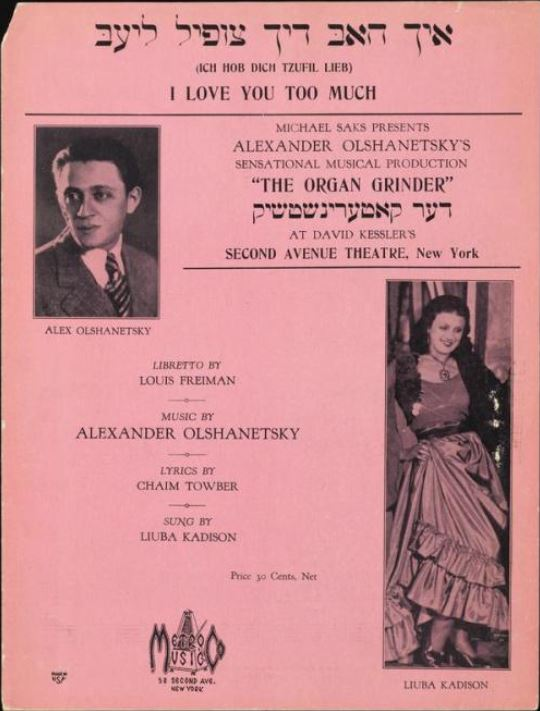
Alexander Olshanetsky and Luba Kadison on the sheet music cover

Amidst the 1933–34 season, Luba Kadison achieved success, marking it as one of her notable years. The premiere of Der Katerinshtshik (The Organ-grinder) by Alexander Olshanetsky unfolded on the stage of the Second Avenue Theater in New York. Notably, in this production, Kadison shared the stage with renowned performers Julius Natanson and Annie Thomashefsky (Boris Thomashefsky's sister).

A pivotal moment in Kadison's career emerged as she took on the role of the first performer of the iconic song penned by Chaim Towber, "Ikh Hob Dikh Tsu Fil Lib" ("I Love You So Much"). Her rendition garnered acclaim for its "taste and restraint," setting it apart from other productions at the Theater on Second Avenue. In the subsequent years, this song achieved widespread popularity among Jewish artists, transcending its initial theatrical context. Its recognition expanded beyond the confines of the Jewish community, becoming a cherished piece in the broader cultural landscape.

== Personal life ==
Luba Kadison married fellow actor Joseph Buloff by 1925, in Bucharest. They had a daughter, Barbara. Kadison was widowed when Joseph Buloff died in 1985. Luba Kadison died in 2006, at age 99. She was the last survivor from the Vilna Troupe.

The papers of Joseph Buloff and Luba Kadison are archived at the YIVO Institute for Jewish Research, in New York City.
