= Miriam Orleska =

Polish actress (1900–1943)

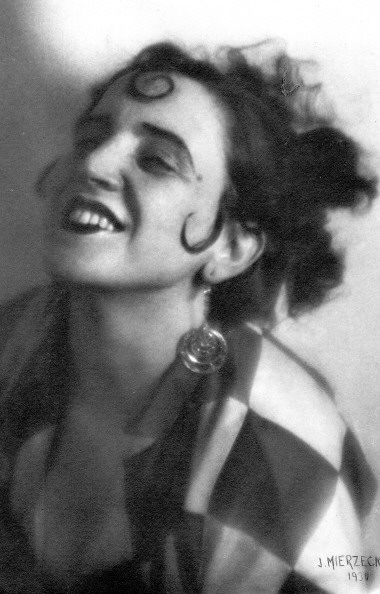
- Orleska in 1930
- Born: 1900; Warsaw, Poland
- Died: 1943 (aged 42–43); Treblinka extermination camp, Poland
- Occupation: Actress
- Spouse: Mordechai Mazo (1889–1942)

Miriam Orleska (Yiddish: מרים אָרלעסקאָ; 1900 in Warsaw – 1943 in Treblinka extermination camp) was an actress in the Vilna Yiddish theatre, best known for her role as Leah in S. Ansky's The Dybbuk.

== Biography ==
Orleska started acting at a young age, and played the role of David in a production of Sholem Asch's Mitn shtrom in her last year in the gymnasium. She studied theatre at the Instytut Pedagogiczny w Warszawie and the Warszawska Szkola Dramatyczna under Helena Hryniewiecka, Antoni Bednarczyk, and Aleksander Zelwerowicz.

Orleska helped found the Vilna Troupe in 1919, with which she performed in Poland, Romania, France, Germany, the Netherlands, Belgium, and England. She played roles in S. Ansky's Day and Night, Peretz Hirschbein's Griene Felder and Die Puste Kretshme, a stage adaption of Sholem Aleichem's The Bloody Hoax, and Yiddish versions of Karl Gutzkow's Uriel Acosta, Arthur Schnitzler's Liebelei, Molière's L'Avare, and Eugene O'Neill's' All God's Chillun Got Wings.

Orleska is best known for playing Leah in the premiere of S. Ansky's The Dybbuk in 1920. For this role, Robert Musil described Orleska as "the most beautiful actress since Duse appeared upon the stage" and adding "One wishes to see this actress in a great role on the European stage, perhaps Desdemona."

During the Holocaust, Orleska acted in the Warsaw Ghetto's Femina Theater and later the Polish-language Nowy Teatr Kameralny. She also worked in the Aleynhilf, the most important social welfare organization in the ghetto. She was murdered in the Treblinka extermination camp in 1943, along with her husband Mordechai Mazo.
