= Hertz Grosbard =

Polish reciter (1892–1994)

Hertz Grosbard (1892−1994) was a Polish reciter. He performed recitations of Yiddish literature during the 20th century.

== Biography ==
He was born in Łódź to a religious family. In 1919 he was an actor member of the Vilna Troupe of Warsaw (Yiddish Theater Ensemble). During the 1920s he began performing what came to be known as his "word concerts" to great critical acclaim. During the "word concerts" he recited classics of Yiddish literature such as works of Itsik Manger and Scholem Aleichem. He was very popular and performed extensively both in Europe, the Americas, and in Israel, e.g. in Vilnius he performed more than 50 times between 1928 and 1940. Ten albums with selections of his word concerts were issued in the 1950s and 1960s. He held his last concert in 1992 in Holon, Israel, in conjunction with his 100th birthday.
