= William Siegel =

20th-century American graphic artist and illustrator

William Siegel, later William Sanderson
- Born: Wilhelm Tsiegelnitsky; 1905; Riga, Russian Empire
- Died: 1990 (aged 84–85)
- Occupations: Artist (painter), illustrator
- Known for: Illustrations in New Masses

William Siegel (1905–1990; born Wilhelm Tsiegelnitsky, later William Sanderson) was an American painter and illustrator. Early in his career, he worked as a contributing editor publishing illustrations in New Masses magazine. During the Great Depression he developed a successful career illustrating children's books, including Marion Hurd McNeely's Newbery Honor Book The Jumping-Off Place. He also worked in magazine illustration and advertising, before being drafted into the U.S. Army in World War II. He served at Lowry Air Force Base in Denver, before being sent to Germany. After the war he became an assistant professor of Advertising Design at the University of Denver, teaching there from 1946 until his retirement in 1972. He was considered "one of the mainstays, one of the people who helped build the School of Art" and is an important modernist artist in Colorado.

== Background ==
Wilhelm Tsiegelnitsky was born in 1905 to Grigori Mojesevich Tsiegelnitsky, a construction engineer, and his wife Berta in a village near Riga, Russian Empire. His parents were of Russian-Jewish and German-Jewish background but the family was baptised in the Russian Orthodox Church for economic reasons. In 1917, during the Bolshevik Revolution they lived with relatives in Rostov-on-the-Don. While there, William took classes at Chinyenov Art School.

In 1921, the family left Rostov and emigrated to the United States, traveling on short-term visas via Kiev, Italy and Greece. They were sponsored by relatives in New Jersey, and arrived in the US in 1923. Their names were anglicized to Gregory, Bertha, and William Siegel. In Newark, Delaware, William studied with Ida Wells Stroud at the Fawcett School of Industrial Art (later the Newark School of Fine and Industrial Art). He went on to study at the National Academy of Design in New York City from 1924 to 1927. His teachers included Charles Hawthorne (painting), William Auerbach-Levy (etching) and Charles Louis Hinton (life drawing). Sanderson won prizes in Life Drawing (Suydam Medal), Composition (First Prize), and Etching (Honorable Mention). In 1928 he joined the Art Students League in New York to study with lithographer Charles Locke, but could not afford to continue.

== Career ==
In 1926, Siegel had a woodcut illustration published in Der Hammer (to which Moyshe Nadir contributed): "in an intentionally crude style, Siegel portrayed many workers shouting slogans at what was clearly a protest rally."

As early as 1926, Siegel published work in the New Masses magazine as a "contributing editor". He also contributed to books and pamphlets of International Publishers, the printing arm of the Communist Party USA headed by Alexander Trachtenberg. He was active with New Masses until 1936, when he chose to leave, disliking the direction the magazine was moving in politically.

During the Great Depression of the 1930s, Siegel earned a steady income as a book illustrator. (This disqualified him for participating in the Works Projects Administration.) His works included the Newbery Honor Book The Jumping-Off Place by Marion Hurd McNeely; Yermak the Conqueror by P.N. Krasnoff; Fanfan in China by Joe Lederer, Freighter Holiday by Fay Orr. His work was included in the 1935 Fifth Exhibition of American Book Illustration, which was sponsored by American Institute of Graphic Arts.

By 1931, Siegel was a member of the John Reed Clubs and showed his work with fellow members Jacob Burck, Hugo Gellert, William Gropper, and Louis Lozowick among others. For the club, he served in 1934 as secretary of a Birobidzhan art committee. He also exhibited at the John Reed Club's ACA Galleries in New York City. In 1934, the New School of Social Research in New York City exhibited some drawings and possibly watercolors by Siegel as well as Anton Refregier. In 1936, he joined others in calling for an American Artists' Congress. In 1937 Siegel held a solo show at the ACA (American Contemporary Art) Galleries in New York.

As of 1931, William Siegel became a naturalized citizen of the United States. By 1936 he was informally using the last name Sanderson, a name change that became official as of 1941. Through the 1930s and 1940s, he published magazine illustrations and covers, appearing in The New Yorker, Esquire, Cue, and Harper's. In 1938, he was appointed art director of the McCue Ad Agency in New York.

In March 1942, William Sanderson was drafted into the U.S. Army and sent to Kessler Field near Biloxi, Mississippi for basic training. He served at Lowry Air Force Base in Denver in the Army Air Corps, publishing amusing drawings of life in the army in the base's Rev-Meter newspaper. He had a solo show of black-and-white drawings of army life at the Denver Art Museum-Chappell House, and began painting watercolors. While at Lowry he began a lifetime friendship with artist Vance Kirkland. In 1943 he met Ruth Lambertson of Cedar Falls, Iowa at the Colorado Springs Fine Arts Center. They married eight weeks later, remaining married for forty-seven years.

During the final months of World War II, he worked for the American ground forces as an interpreter of Russian, to coordinate activities of the American and Soviet Armies as they approached Berlin. He later used photographs of Berlin to paint a montage of the bombed city, Berlin 1945 (1947).

After leaving the army, Sanderson was hired at the University of Denver in 1946, as an assistant professor of Advertising Design. Sanderson was a charter member of the group 15 Colorado Artists, founded in 1948 by Vance Kirkland and other faculty artists from the university. He taught at the University of Denver until 1972, when he retired. His large body of work includes both oils and watercolors. Stylistically, he produced stylized realist and surrealist images, as well as a period of abstract expressionist works. Many employ a bright joyful palette, large blocks of color, and undulating lines. His paintings were often inspired by Colorado's outdoors, but also reflect his experiences in both childhood and army life.

He considered social criticism to be an important part of an artist's work, and was responsive to racial prejudice in works such as Whites Only and Brief Encounter and to Chicano social and political concerns in Tierra y Libertad (Land and Liberty) and La Pulqueria (Pulque Drinking).

"I believe the artist is first of all a human being with the ability to see and depict the hope, aspirations and the despair of other human beings.".... "Unfortunately most artists today are concerned only with textures, brushstrokes and technique. It isn't very fashionable to be involved. But my feeling is that a painter has a responsibility to society."

After retiring, the Sandersons lived in Fort Morgan, Colorado. He died in 1990, after suffering from leukemia and Alzheimer's disease.

== Works ==
New Masses covers:

- "Wharf Nigger" (November 1929)
- "Negro Workers" (July 1930)

New Masses illustrations:

- "Going Up" (October 1926)
- "Nine Years" (November 1926)
- "Wanhsien Massacre" (November 1926)
- "He Wants More Than Pie in the Sky" (December 1926)
- "Another Triumph of Free Speech" (January 1927)
- "China Awakens" (January 1927)
- "Crusaders Ordered South" (February 1927)
- "The White Peril" (March 1927)
- "Decoration" (March 1927)
- "Faster, Headsman, Faster!" (April 1927)
- "The Miners – Who Will Lead Them?" (June 1927)
- "Fifth Avenue Bus" (October 1927)
- "We–US & Co." (February 1928)
- "Decorations" (February 1928)
- "Subway Track Walkers" (July 1928)
- "The Linesman" (July 1928)
- "It Will Fall" (July 1928)
- "(Unnamed, shows miners)" (September 1928)
- "Strike!" (October 1928)
- "(Unnamed, shows miners)" (November 1928)
- "(Unnamed, with "Decaying Beauty")" (January 1929)
- "Proletarian Art" (March 1929)
- "Death of a Miner" (April 1929)
- "Iron Dinosaur" (July 1929)
- "An Anthology of American Negro Literature" (February 1930)
- "Subway" (March 1930)
- "Office Workers Lunch Hour" (April 1930)
- "The white bourgeois version of the Negro" (May 1930)
- "–as the white worker knows him" (May 1930)
- "Book Bargains" (May 1930)
- "Lynched Negro Worker" (September 1930)
- "(Unnamed, with "Strike!" and "Expensive")" (November 1930)
- "(Unnamed on back cover)" (November 1930)
- "...but Holy Father, look what we have done for the church!" (February 1931)
- "Unnamed (reads "Vive La Commune")" (March 1931)
- "Unnamed (with "Can You Make Out Their Voices")" (March 1931)
- "A Few Thoughts for 'Independence Day' On – Scottboro - Mooney & Billings - The Unemployed" (July 1931)
- "The Recruiting Agent, M.A., PH.D., D.D." (August 1931)
- "Books on Soviet Russia" (September 1931)
- "If Winter Comes" (September 1931)
- "Evolution of the Socialist Party" (November 1931)
- "The Mooney Case" (April 1932)
- "Ford" (May 1932)
- "Capitalist Crisis" (June 1932)
- "Equal Rights for Negroes" (July 1932)
- "Eviction" (July 1933)
- "Proposed Mural for the College of the City of New York" (July 1933)
- "(Unnamed, from The Paris Commune" (April 1934)
- "Symbols of Fascism" (October 1935)
- "Strike" (November 1935)

Books, pamphlets illustrated:

- Road to Cathay (1928)
- Treasure of the Château (1929)
- Boy's Gengis Khan (1930)
- In Lawrence's Bodyguard (1930)
- Land Spell (1930)
- American History Retold in Pictures (1931)
- The Paris Commune: A Story in Pictures (1932)
- Uproar in the Village (1933)
- Our Lenin (1934)
- Bananas: The Fruit Empire of Wall Street (1935)

Books written and illustrated:

- Around the World in a Mailbag (1932)

== See also ==
- New Masses
- International Publishers
- Alexander Trachtenberg
