= Joseph Buloff =

Lithuanian-born American actor and director (1899–1985)

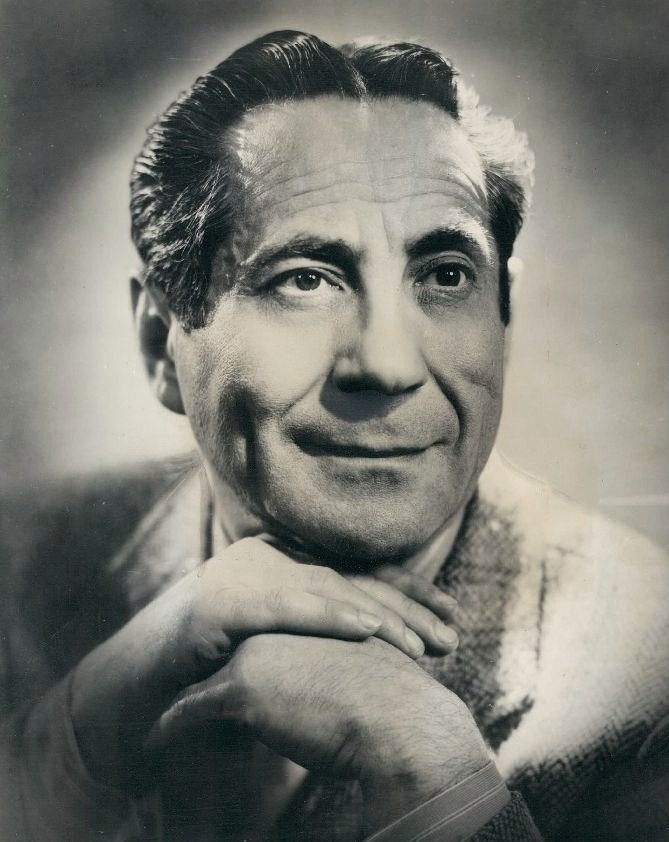
- Buloff in 1960
- Born: December 6, 1899; Vilna, Lithuania, Russian Empire
- Died: February 27, 1985 (aged 85); Manhattan, New York, U.S.
- Occupation: Actor
- Years active: 1923–1981
- Spouse: Luba Kadison (m. 1925)
- Children: 1

Joseph Buloff (December 6, 1899 – February 27, 1985) was a Jewish actor and director known for his work in Broadway and Yiddish theatre. He received the Itzik Manger Prize for contributions to Yiddish letters in 1974.

== Life and career ==
Buloff was born on December 6, 1899, in Vilna, in what was then the Russian Empire and is now Lithuania.

Buloff debuted on stage with the Jewish State Theatre in Vilna. He joined the Vilna Troupe when he was a teenager, and "his first major success" came in that company's production of Day and Night by S. Ansky. While with the troupe, he also met Luba Kadison, whom he married and remained with until his death six decades later. They had a daughter, Barbara.

Buloff immigrated to the United States in 1927 and worked with Maurice Schwartz's Yiddish theatre company. Buloff and Kadison toured Europe and the Western Hemisphere in the early 1930s, acting with Yiddish troupes in the countries that they visited. Their productions included adaptations of works by Dostoevski and Tolstoy and translated versions of works by Chekhov, Molière, and Pirandello.

Broadway productions in which Buloff appeared included The Price (1979), The Fifth Season (1975), The Wall (1960), Moonbirds (1959), Once More, With Feeling (1958), Mrs. McThing (1952), The Whole World Over (1947), Oklahoma! (1943), Spring Again (1941), My Sister Eileen (1940), Morning Star (1940), The Man from Cairo (1938), To Quito and Back (1937), Call Me Ziggy (1937), and Don't Look Now (1936).

On February 27, 1985, Buloff died at his Manhattan home, aged 86. He left a memoir, written in Yiddish, which was translated by Joseph Singer and published by Harvard University Press in 1991 as From the Old Marketplace.

== Legacy ==
Some of Buloff's papers are preserved at YIVO and at the New York Public Library for the Performing Arts.

== Filmography ==
Year	Title	Role	Notes
1941	Let's Make Music	Joe Bellah	
1941	They Met in Argentina	Santiago, O'Shea's Trainer	
1947	Carnegie Hall	Anton Tribik	
1948	To the Victor	Bolyanov	
1948	The Loves of Carmen	Remendado	
1949	A Kiss in the Dark	Peter Danilo	
1950	Monticello, Here We Come		
1956	Somebody Up There Likes Me	Benny	
1957	Silk Stockings	Ivanov	
1981	Reds	Joe Volski	
