= Isidor Goldenberg =

Isidor Goldenberg (1870–?) was a Romanian Jewish singer and actor, prominent in Yiddish theater in the late 19th and early 20th century.

As a boy, he sang in the choir of Leibuş Sanberg. In 1883, as an adolescent, he performed in Iaşi with the troupe of Sigmund Mogulesko, Sigmund Feinmann, and Moishe Finkel. This inspired him to organize his own youth theater. In 1885, he toured in a troupe led by Zaharia Filipescu and his wife.

In Galaţi he spent a summer performing in one of the garden theaters common at the time, then worked with a singer named Solomonescu, before hooking up with the troupe of Marcu Segalescu, in which he played small roles.

He travelled with Segalescu to Botoşani, where he played larger roles, notably Avesalom in Abraham Goldfaden's Shulamith and Max in Goldfaden's The Two Kuni-Lemls.

He performed with Axelrod in Lviv from 1889 to 1891, then in Budapest with Josef Eskraiz, Shramek, and Veinstock, back to Lviv where he played in several Goldfaden plays Rabbi Yosselmann, The Tenth Commandment, Judith and Holofernes and Baron Rothschild. From there he went on to Budapest again, then to Bucharest, where he joined the Jigniţa Theater as an actor and (from 1897) a director of the company.

Beginning in 1904, he had great success with the more naturalistic repertoire of Jacob Gordin; in 1906 he played in one of the many Yiddish productions of Karl Gutzkow's Uriel Acosta, before heading to New York City, where he performed with Jacob Adler, Boris Thomashefsky, Max Morrison, and others. He loved the New York Yiddish audience, who showed more enthusiasm than any he had ever known. At the time he wrote "...they applauded, clamoured, vociferated, whistled — yes, whistled", they held up the play for a quarter of an hour with their applause, "sincere, spontaneous, and from the heart."

He returned to Europe and, in 1913, upon the death of Moritz Lieblich, became the director of the Jigniţa, which throughout World War I was a highlight of the distressed wartime Bucharest theater scene. Remaining at Jigniţa, in 1923 he invited the Vilna troupe to Romania, where their Stanislavski-influenced style revolutionized Romanian Yiddish theater and, arguably, Romanian theater in general.
