= Marian Hurd McNeely =

American children's book writer

Marian Kent Hurd McNeely (née Hurd; July 26, 1877 – December 18, 1930) was an American children's book author. Her work Jumping-Off Place received a Newbery Honor in 1930.

== Biography ==
Marian Kent Hurd was born on July 26, 1877, in Dubuque, Iowa, the second of four children of Louis G. and Lymna Maxfield Hurd. She worked for a newspaper around the turn of the century, writing a column from 1903 to 1906. She then left for Italy for a year. She married Lee McNeely on May 4, 1910. They had four children.

For two years, they homesteaded at Rosebud Indian Reservation, which became the inspiration for The Jumping-Off Place.

Apart from her books, McNeely wrote short stories and poems which appeared in publications such as St. Nicholas Magazine, Literary Digest, Ladies' Home Journal and the Saturday Review of Literature. A Ballade of Losers, was a humorous poem about being an also-ran for the Newbery Medal.

She was killed on December 18, 1930, when she was hit by a car while crossing a street.

== Works ==
- 1905: Miss Billy
- 1909: When she came home from college
- 1928: Rusty Ruston: A story for brothers and sisters
- 1929: The Jumping-Off Place
- 1931: Winning Out
- 1932: The way to glory and other stories
