= Julius Nathanson =

Actor and comedian in Yiddish theater

- דזשוליוס נאַטאַנזאָן
- Born: July 17, 1890; Pavoloch, Kiev Governorate, Russian Empire
- Died: May 14, 1957 (aged 66); Reseda, California
- Citizenship: Russian Empire; United States
- Occupation: Actor
- Known for: Contributions to Yiddish theatre

Julius Nathanson (sometimes spelled Natanson, Yiddish: נאַטאַנזאָן, דזשוליוס, July 17, 1890 – May 14, 1957) was a prominent figure on the Yiddish stage, known for his career as both a character actor and comedian. Over the course of nearly five decades, he made significant contributions to Yiddish theater.

== Early life ==
Julius Nathanson was born on July 17, 1890, in Pavoloch, Kiev Governorate, Russian Empire (now Ukraine). His father worked as a grain trader. Until the age of ten, Natanson studied in a cheder and sang with a cantor in the local synagogue choir. Later, when his family moved to Kiev, he became a lace worker. During his time in Kiev, Natanson sang for several years in a chorus at Brodsky Synagogue. Simultaneously, he worked as an employee in a haberdashery store and, later, in a hotel. In the evenings, he pursued education at the handverker (artisan) school.

== Immigration to the United States ==
In 1905, Nathanson's family arrived in the United States and settled in Chicago. For two years, Julius worked in a tailor shop, attended evening school, and privately took Yiddish lessons.

In 1907, Nathanson began working in Jewish theaters: as a wardrobe attendant, a ticket seller, a role transcriber and poster paster.

== Theatrical career ==
Nathanson's career then took him to different cities, including St. Louis, Cincinnati, and Cleveland, where he worked in various capacities, such as a singer in a Jewish cinema and a prompter in theater troupes. Nathanson continued his pursuits in the entertainment industry, managing a cinema in Denver for two years and returning to cabarets as a singer. His collaborations with his wife, Anna, in English vaudeville acts took him to various provincial troupes. Securing an engagement at Liberty Theatre in New York City marked a turning point for Nathanson. Subsequently, he joined Boris Thomashefsky's People's Theatre in the same season, where he landed roles in plays alongside Thomashefsky's wife, Bessie.

Over the following seasons, Nathanson played at the National Theater and spent a year in Boston, serving as both an actor and manager. He returned to New York, joining the cast of New York's Grand Theatre. Later, he returned to Boston, where he was the leading actor and director of a local Jewish theater for four years.

In 1927–1928, Nathanson acted at the Second Avenue Theater, and in the 1928–1929 season, he directed a theater in Philadelphia. Following this, he toured Argentina and other Latin American countries in 1930.

In 1931, Nathanson performed at the Chicago's Lawndale Theatre, toured the American provinces, and visited Europe. He continued his involvement in the Yiddish theater community, becoming a member of the executive committee of the Hebrew Actors' Union and the editorial board of the Lexicon of the Yiddish Theatre.

Julius Nathanson died on May 14, 1957, at his home at Reseda, California, at the age of 66.

== Personal life ==
Julius Nathanson was married to Anna Nathanson (1895–1988), also a figure in the Jewish theater and an actress.
