= Village East by Angelika =

Movie theater in Manhattan, New York

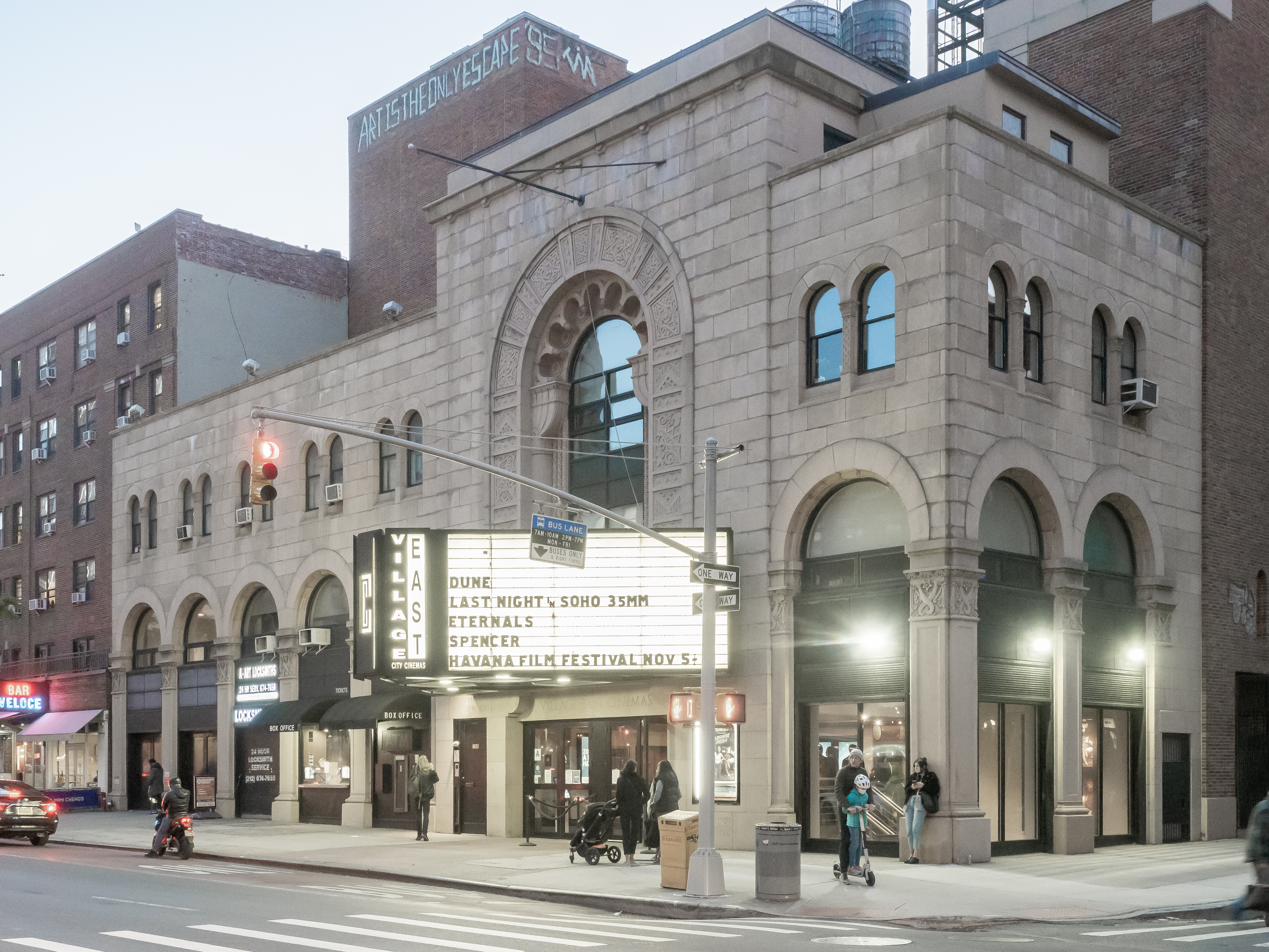
- Interactive map of Village East by Angelika
- Former names: List: Louis N. Jaffe Theater; Yiddish Art Theatre (1926–1928, 1932–1934); Yiddish Folks Theatre (1928–1937); Molly Picon's Folks Theatre (1930–1931); Germans' Folks Theatre (1931–1932); Century Theatre (1937–1946); New Jewish Folk Theatre (1944–1945); Stuyvesant Theatre (1946–1953); Phoenix Theatre (1953–1961); Casino East Theater (1961–1965); Gayety Theater (1965–1969); Eden Theater (1969–1976); 12th Street Cinema (1976–1977); Entermedia Theater (1977–1985); Second Avenue Theater (1985–1988); Village East Cinema (1991–2021)
- Address: 181–189 Second Avenue
- Location: East Village, Manhattan, New York City
- Coordinates: 40°43′51″N 73°59′11″W
- Owner: Senyar Holding Company
- Operator: City Cinemas (Reading International); Angelika Film Center
- Type: Yiddish, Off-Broadway
- Screen: 7
- Current use: Movie theater
- Public transit: New York City Subway: Third Avenue, First Avenue at Astor Place

Construction
- Architect: Harrison Wiseman

Website
- www.angelikafilmcenter.com/villageeast
- Yiddish Art Theatre
- U.S. National Register of Historic Places
- New York State Register of Historic Places
- New York City Landmark
- Location within Manhattan Location within New York City Location within New York Location within the United States
- Location: 189 Second Avenue, New York, New York
- Coordinates: 40°43′51″N 73°59′11″W
- Area: 12,077 ft^{2} (1,122.0 m^{2})
- Built: 1926
- Architect: Harrison G. Wiseman
- Architectural style: Moorish
- NRHP reference No.: 85002427
- NYSRHP No.: 06101.001791
- NYCL No.: 1764, 1765

Significant dates
- Added to NRHP: September 19, 1985
- Designated NYSRHP: August 16, 1985
- Designated NYCL: February 9, 1993

Village East by Angelika (also Village East, originally the Louis N. Jaffe Art Theatre, and formerly known by several other names (Note: The theater has also been known as the Louis N. Jaffe Theater, Yiddish Art Theatre, Yiddish Folks Theatre, Molly Picon's Folks Theatre, Germans' Folks Theatre, Century Theatre, New Jewish Folk Theatre, Stuyvesant Theatre, Phoenix Theatre, Casino East Theatre, Gayety Theatre, Eden Theatre, 12th Street Cinema, Entermedia Theater, Second Avenue Theater, and Village East Cinema.)) is a movie theater at 189 Second Avenue, on the corner with 12th Street, in the East Village of Manhattan in New York City. Part of the former Yiddish Theatre District, the theater was designed in the Moorish Revival style by Harrison Wiseman and built from 1925 to 1926 by Louis Jaffe. In addition to Yiddish theatre, the theater has hosted off-Broadway shows, burlesque, and movies. Since 1991, it has been operated by Angelika Film Center as a seven-screen multiplex. Both the exterior and interior of the theater are New York City designated landmarks, and the theater is on the National Register of Historic Places.

Village East's main entrance is through a three-story office wing on Second Avenue, which has a facade of cast stone. The auditorium is housed in the rear along 12th Street. The first story contains storefronts and a lobby, while the second and third stories contained offices, which were converted into apartments in the 1960s. The main lobby connects to another lobby along 12th Street with a promenade behind the auditorium. The auditorium consists of a ground-level orchestra and one overhanging balcony with boxes. The balcony remains in its original condition, but the orchestra and former stage area have been divided into six screens.

The Louis N. Jaffe Art Theatre was originally used by the Yiddish Art Theatre and largely served as a Yiddish playhouse from 1926 to 1945. It opened on November 17, 1926, with The Tenth Commandment. The Yiddish Art Theatre moved out of the theater after two seasons, and it became the Yiddish Folks Theatre. The venue was leased by Molly Picon in 1930–1931 and by Misha and Lucy German in 1931–1932. The Yiddish Arts Theatre then performed at the theater until 1934, after which the Yiddish Folks continued for two more years. From 1936 to 1944, the building was a movie theater called the Century Theatre, hosting Yiddish performances during two seasons.

After a decline in Yiddish theater, the Jaffe Art Theatre was renamed the Stuyvesant Theatre in 1946 and continued as a movie theater for seven years. The then-new Phoenix Theatre used the playhouse from 1953 to 1961. The Jaffe Art Theatre then became the Casino East Theatre, which hosted the burlesque production This Was Burlesque for three years before becoming a burlesque house called the Gayety Theatre in 1965. The theater was renamed yet again in 1969, this time operating as the off-Broadway Eden Theatre until 1976, showing the revue Oh! Calcutta! The venue was then converted into a movie theater, the 12th Street Cinema, before returning to live shows in 1977 under the name Entermedia Theatre (renamed the Second Avenue Theatre in 1985). After closing in 1988, the venue was renovated into Village East Cinema, reopening in 1991. Angelika rebranded the theater in 2021.

== Description ==
Village East, originally the Yiddish Art Theatre, is at the southwestern corner of East 12th Street and Second Avenue in the East Village of Manhattan in New York City, within the former Yiddish Theatre District. The theater occupies a rectangular land lot of 12,077 square feet (1,122.0 m^{2}), with a frontage of 103 feet (31 m) on Second Avenue and 117.25 feet (36 m) on 12th Street. It is composed of two sections: a three-story office wing with a cast-stone facade, facing east on Second Avenue, as well as an auditorium wing with a brown-brick facade, extending westward along 12th Street. The site is a block north of St. Mark's Church.

The theater was built by Louis Jaffe, a developer and prominent Jewish community leader, for Maurice Schwartz's Yiddish Art Theatre, which presented works in Yiddish. The theater was designed in the Moorish Revival style by Harrison Wiseman, while William Pogany consulted on the interior design. Despite the prevalence of Yiddish theaters in the area in the early 20th century, the Jaffe Art Theatre was the only one in the Yiddish Theatre District that was specifically built for a Yiddish theatrical group. By the 21st century, Village East was the only remaining Yiddish theater building on Second Avenue, the one-time center of the Yiddish Theatre District.

=== Facade ===
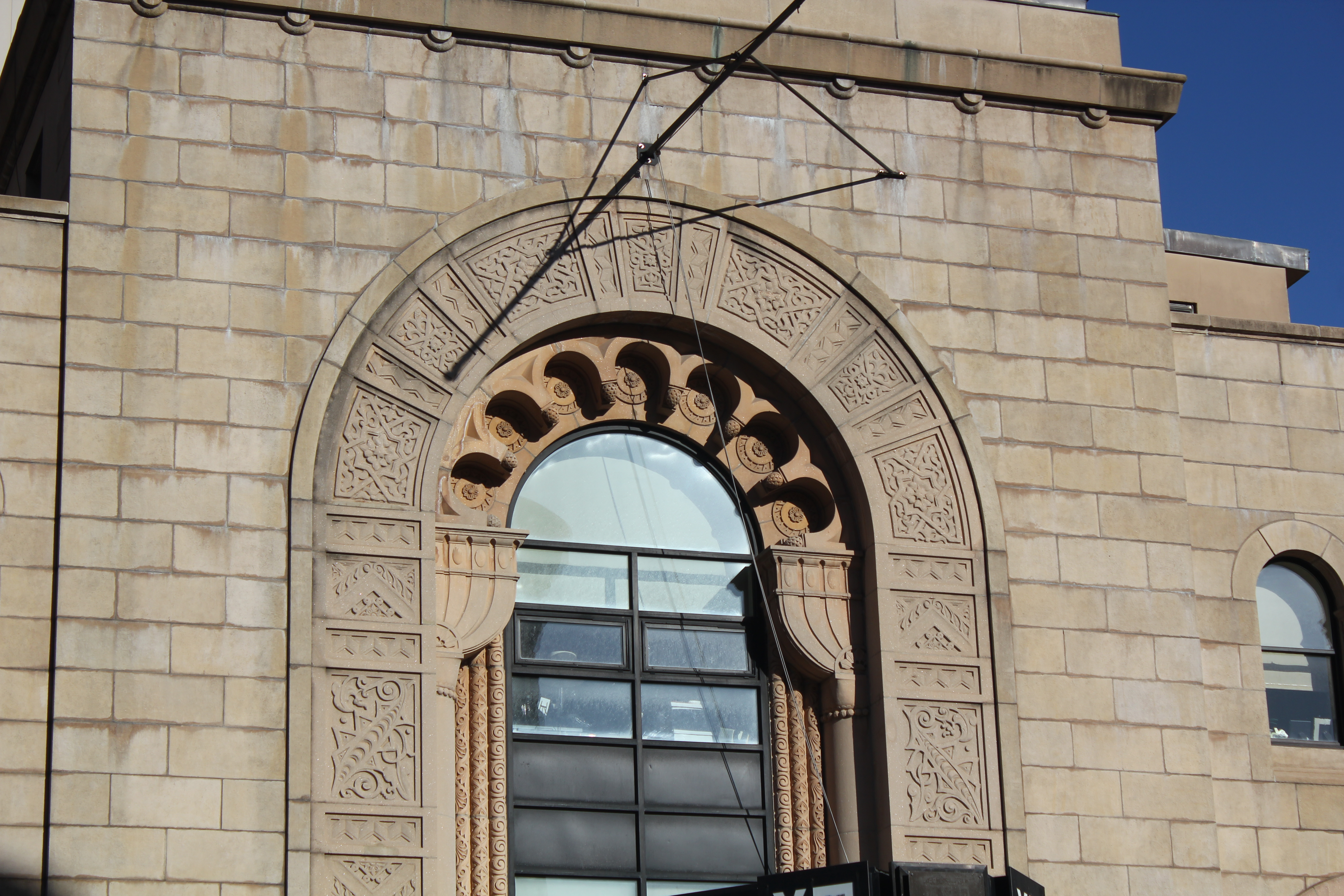
Detail of main entrance arch. In the intrados of the arch are half-menorahs. Above those, seven Moorish-style openings with medallions are arranged in a semicircle.

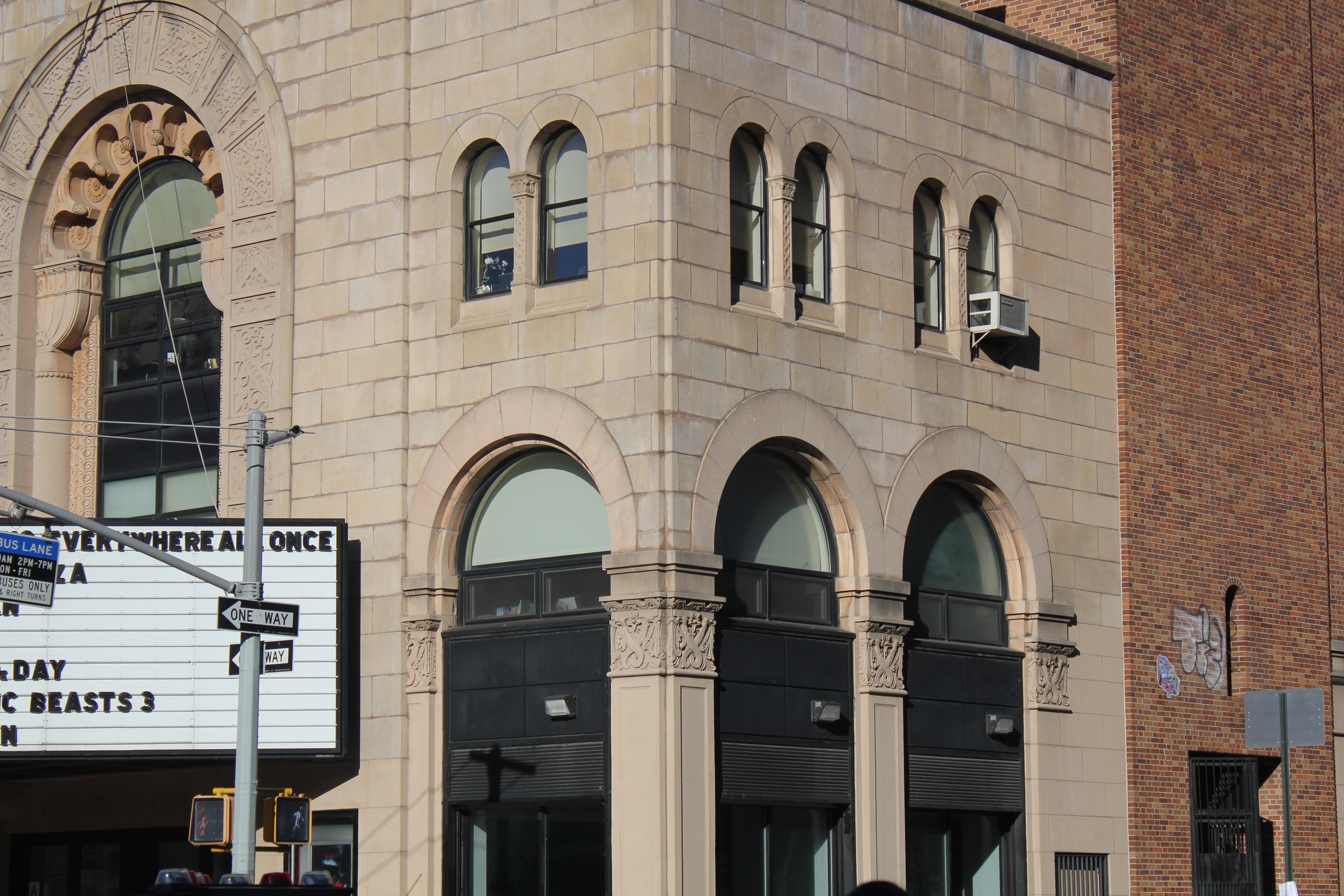
Detail of smaller arches on Second Avenue (left) and 12th Street (right)

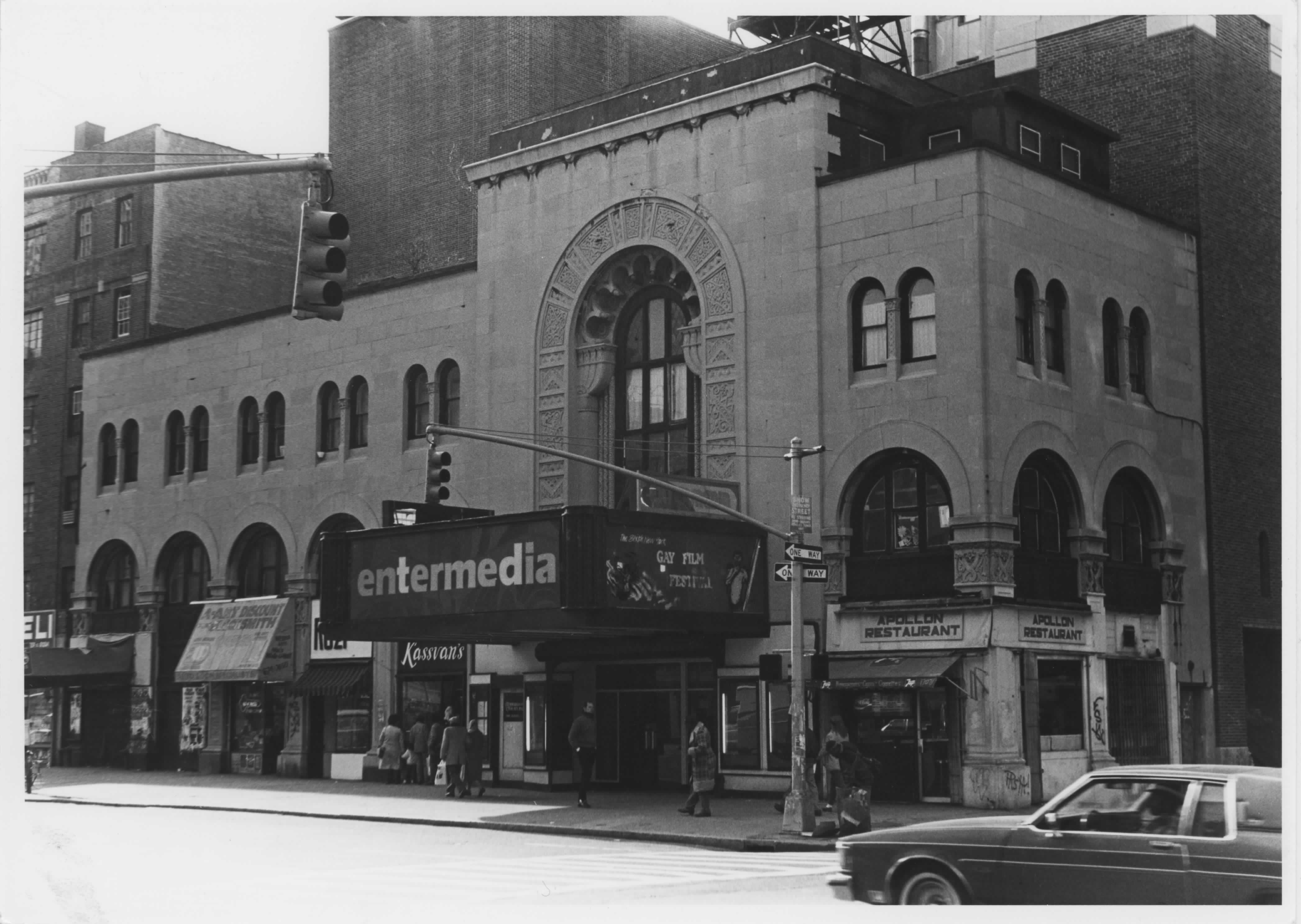
Exterior of the Entermedia Theater in 1985

On the building's Second Avenue elevation, the first two stories consist of a double-height arcade with seven arches, each corresponding to one bay. The main entrance is in the second-northernmost bay and is taller and wider than the others. This bay contains a large archway surrounded by panels with geometric and foliate decorations. There are four metal-and-glass doors at the ground floor, with a projecting triangular marquee sign above. The marquee was originally rectangular and had decorations at its corners. To the left (south) of the main entrance is a door to the upper office stories, topped by a lintel with the inscribed words "Jaffe Art Theatre Bldg". To the right (north) is a sign board and a cornerstone, containing an inscription of the Gregorian date May 23, 1926, in English and the corresponding Hebrew calendar date in Hebrew. The intrados, near the top of the arch, contains capitals shaped like half-menorahs. Above those, seven Moorish-style openings with medallions are arranged in a semicircle. The top of the entrance bay contains a cornice supported by round corbels.

The other six arches are identical round-arched openings and are separated by paneled pilasters. The top of each pilaster contains a capital with foliate and geometric motifs and birds. The smaller arches formerly contained six storefronts, one in each bay. After the building was converted into a cinema in 1990, the northernmost bay was converted to an interior staircase, while the two bays immediately south of the main entrance became ticket counters. The remaining storefronts in the three southernmost bays contain aluminum storefronts at the first floor, as well as aluminum spandrel panels between the first and second floors. At the third floor, there are two small arched windows in each bay. These are separated by pilasters with guilloche motifs, which are topped by capitals with foliate decorations. The roof above the northernmost bay contains a small dormer unit, while the roof above the southern five bays is a terrace.

The easternmost portion of the 12th Street elevation contains two bays of double-height arches and paired windows, similar to those in the Second Avenue elevation. The steel-framed auditorium structure is clad in brick. The outer portions of the auditorium facade are treated as pavilions. They are slightly taller than the rest of the auditorium and protrude slightly from the central section of the facade. Each outer pavilion contains a metal gate at ground level, above which is an arched opening with a fire stair behind it. The center of the facade contains a cast-stone doorway surrounding five sets of exit doors. There is a carved corbel on either side of the doorway. Above the doors is a blind brick arch, surrounding a panel with pink terracotta quatrefoils. The top of the auditorium facade is made of a band of cast stone. An alley runs to the west of the theater.

=== Interior ===
The interior is decorated in a gold, blue, rose, cream, and silver color scheme. Many of the interior decorations are inspired by the Alhambra in Spain. The decorations also contain elements of Moorish, Islamic, and Judaic architecture. Most decorations resemble their original condition, even though the layout of the theater has been substantially changed. The interior of Village East was used as a filming location for the films The Night They Raided Minsky's in 1968 and The Fan in 1981, as well as a promotional video for Reese's Peanut Butter Cups in 1984.

==== Lobbies ====
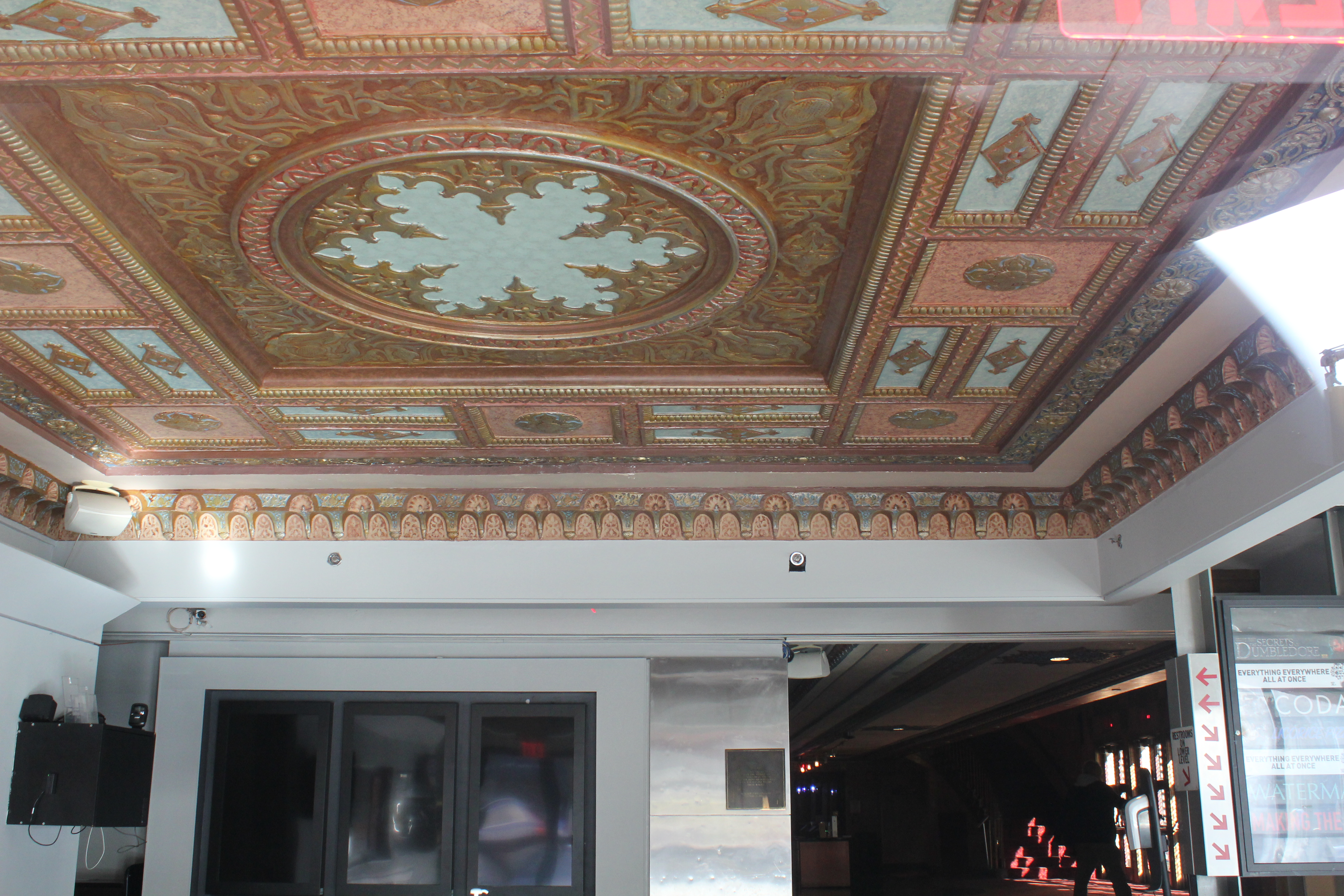
Ceiling of the main lobby

The theater has two lobbies. The main one on Second Avenue was a square space (subsequently expanded to a rectangular space), while a secondary lobby on 12th Street provides access to the balcony level. When the theater was converted into a movie theater in the early 1990s, all of the floor surfaces were covered or replaced with a carpet containing red, gold, blue, and gray patterns.

Originally, the main lobby had a floor made of terracotta, with a pattern of white rhombus motifs. The box office was on the north wall, while the south wall contained mirrored panels. Only the original ceiling of the main lobby remains intact. The center of the ceiling contains a medallion; the edges of the ceiling contain a frieze with corbels, as well as decorative rectangular and square panels. During the early-1990s renovation, the lobby was expanded southward, and a concession stand and a wall of poster boards were installed. The lobby also contains an exhibit about the history of Yiddish theatre.

On the northern side of the theater building, to the right of the main lobby, is the 12th Street lobby. The walls there are buff-colored and are designed to resemble travertine. The exit doors on the north wall contain trefoil arches, corbels, and Moorish exit signs. The ceiling has three circular chandeliers and is ornately designed with floral symbols and circles. The 12th Street lobby connects to a pair of segmentally arched alcoves, inside which are stairs descending to the basement.

On the north wall of the 12th Street lobby, two curved staircases with wrought-iron railings lead up to a narrow promenade behind the balcony-level seating. The underside of the balcony promenade (immediately above the 12th Street lobby) contains three medallions, each of which contains six-pointed arabesques, as well as recessed lighting fixtures and a decorative border. Above the promenade are four rectangular panels and one square panel, each with cartouches at its center, in addition to recessed lighting. Small staircases at the western and eastern ends of the promenade lead up to the top of the balcony-level seating.

==== Auditorium ====
The auditorium has an orchestra level, a balcony, boxes, and a proscenium arch that originally had a stage behind it. The auditorium is oriented toward the south, with the rear wall and 12th Street lobby being to the north. The original auditorium contained 1,143, 1,236, 1,252, or 1,265 seats. The orchestra level was initially raked, sloping down toward an orchestra pit in front of the stage. The stage originally measured 30 by 36 feet (9.1 by 11.0 m) across.

In 1990, the theater was multiplexed, being split into a seven-screen movie theater. Most of the original decorations remain intact, although the seating at orchestra level was raised to the height of the original stage. Screens 1 through 5 are within the original auditorium, while screens 6 and 7 are within the stage area. In all seven screens, the seats are 21 to 22 inches (530 to 560 mm) wide, larger than similar theaters. The balcony level is the largest and most ornate screen; it originally had 500 seats. Below the balcony are four additional screens: two 200-seat venues within the original orchestra level, a 175-seat venue in a former basement restaurant, and a 75-seat venue in a sidewalk vault. The stage area was divided into two screens, one above the other. The lower screen is at the level of the original stage, while the upper screen is about 60 feet (18 m) above the ground, within the former fly loft.

The side walls of the auditorium are made of textured plaster and were initially painted in a buff color, though it was subsequently repainted blue-gray. The front of the balcony is decorated with rosettes and round-arched panels, atop which are a parapet and railing. After the original auditorium was multiplexed, a lower balcony was created in front of the original balcony, connected to it by double staircases. The lower balcony has an exit to the promenade, directly below the original balcony, as well as a ramp leading to an exit on the north wall. There are 40 seats within the lower balcony. On either side of the proscenium arch is a wall section with one box at the balcony level. The boxes are each recessed within a pointed Moorish arch, which is framed by vermiculated quoins and topped by voussoirs. The inner reveals of the boxes contain colonettes, above which are lambrequin arches. The fronts of the boxes contain rosettes and round-arched panels, which wrap around to the front of the balcony. Next to the boxes is a flat proscenium arch, which is surrounded by floral and geometric decorations. The proscenium opening has been bricked up, and a movie screen for the balcony-level seats has been installed within the proscenium.

The middle of the ceiling contains a shallow circular dome measuring 40 feet (12 m) across. At the center of the dome is a medallion with the Star of David, which is enclosed within a larger six-pointed star with trefoils at its "points". A metal chandelier with two tiers hangs from the center of the dome. The outer border of the dome is decorated with wrought-iron grilles and motifs of the Star of David. There are also fascia panels around the dome, some of which have been modified to accommodate projection equipment and ventilation openings. Outside of the dome, the ceiling contains ornate gilded plaster moldings. The decoration is intended to resemble a honeycomb and contains rosettes, eight-pointed stars, and strapwork. There are ducts near where the ceiling intersects with the walls. The ceiling is actually made of 3-by-3-foot (0.91 by 0.91 m) panels suspended from the roof via iron bars.

==== Other spaces ====
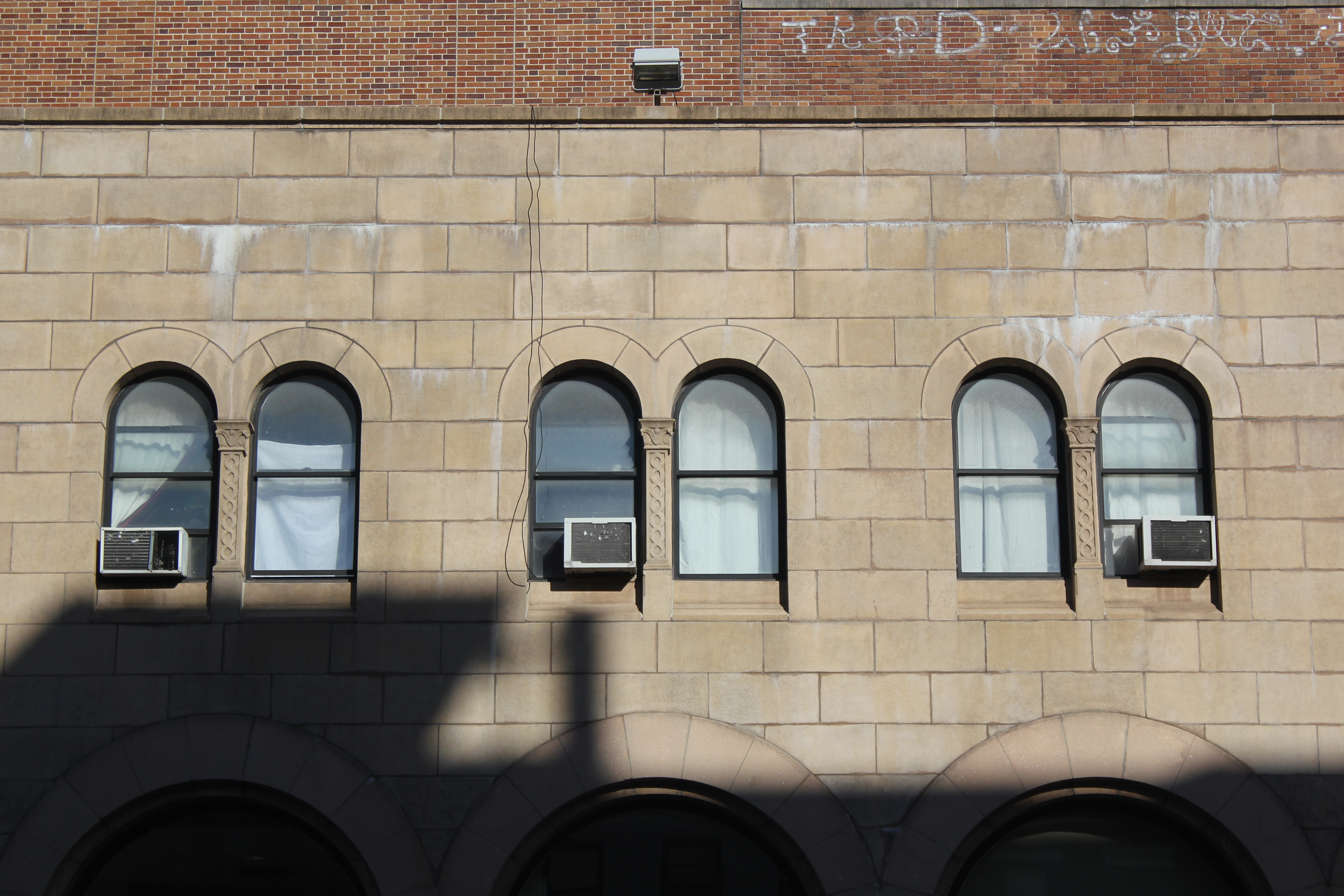
Former office area on Second Avenue

Above the stage were twelve dressing rooms, as well as access to the space above the dome. Under the stage were offices, storage rooms, and access to the orchestra pit. In addition, the theater's restrooms, lounge, and administrative offices were in the basement behind the auditorium (near 12th Street). The lounge contained busts of prominent playwrights and performers in Yiddish theatre, such as Abraham Goldfaden, David Kessler, Jacob Pavlovich Adler, Jacob Gordin, and Sholem Aleichem. The basement also included a restaurant and cabaret/nightclub.

The second and third stories along Second Avenue contained rehearsal rooms. These were accessed from the third bay from north, just left of the main entrance. These floors also contained offices. The Russian Art Restaurant took up one of the storefronts for several years. Among the building's office tenants were the Jewish National Workers Alliance, Yiddisher Kultur Farband, and Jewish Folk Schools. The offices were converted into apartments in the 1960s. The residents included actress Jackie Curtis, photographer Peter Hujar, and painter David Wojnarowicz.

== History ==
During the 1880s, New York City's Jewish immigrant population started moving to the East Village and the Lower East Side in large numbers; many immigrants were Yiddish-speaking Ashkenazi Jews. The Yiddish Theatre District was developed during the late 19th and early 20th centuries to provide entertainment for the growing Jewish population. While most early Yiddish theaters were south of Houston Street, many producers moved north along Second Avenue in the early 20th century. One of them was Maurice Schwartz, who came from Ukraine and founded the Yiddish Art Theatre in 1918. The theatre company was originally housed in several theater buildings. Developer and lawyer Louis N. Jaffe had watched one of the Yiddish Art Theatre's shows at Madison Square Garden and was so impressed that he decided to build a dedicated building for the company.

=== Development and opening ===
In May 1925, Jaffe acquired a site on 12th Street and Second Avenue, formerly part of the Stuyvesant Farm. He hired Harrison G. Wiseman to design a building with a 1,200-seat theater for Schwartz's company. The theater would be designed in what media described as an "old Jerusalem" style. In addition to being the Yiddish Art Theatre's home, the building would contain offices for the theatre company's staff and the Jaffe Art Film Corporation; a gymnasium; and a theatrical library. The theatre company would lease the theater at a nominal price. The demolition of Madison Square Garden had forced the Yiddish Art Players to relocate to the Nora Bayes Theatre in the midtown Theater District. Initially, the project was to have been completed in December 1925.

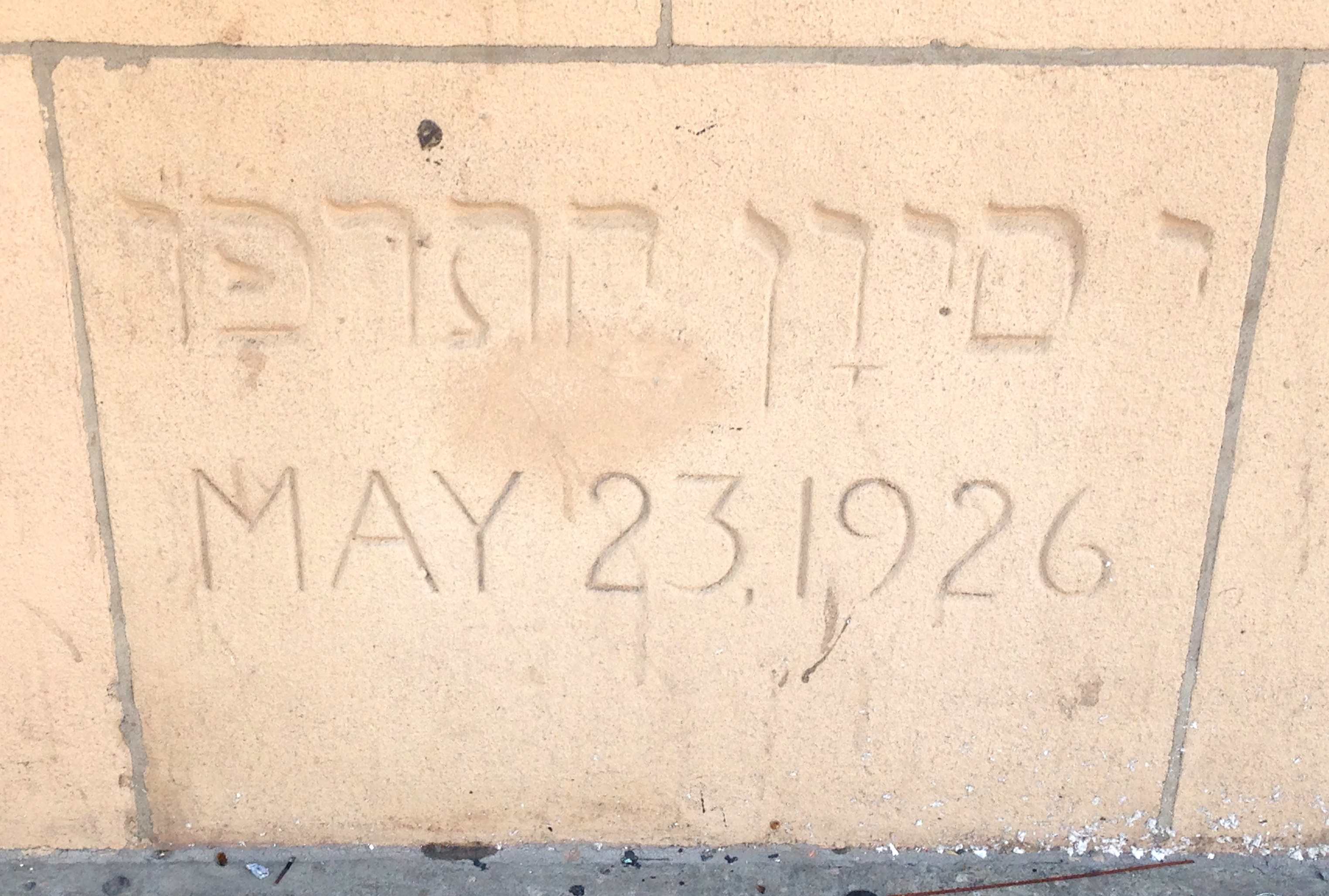
Cornerstone showing both English and Hebrew dates

Wiseman filed plans with the New York City Department of Buildings (DOB) at the end of May 1925, shortly after Jaffe acquired the site. The building was to cost $235,000. The DOB initially objected to the project because of its location within a residential neighborhood, the lack of exits to the west, and the absence of a setback along Second Avenue. Site-clearing began the next month, and five old houses were torn down to make way for the theater. Olga Loev, widow of Sholem Aleichem, laid the theater's cornerstone at a ceremony on May 23, 1926. Playwright Herman Bernstein said that the event was "of magnitude for Jews in America", given the Yiddish Art Theatre's success in spite of early difficulties. Portraits of Abraham Goldfaden (the "father of the Yiddish theatre movement") and Peter Stuyvesant (the owner of the Stuyvesant Farm) were placed inside the cornerstone. Jaffe said he wanted the theater to be "a permanent monument to prove that the Jewish immigrant to [the United States] is a useful citizen and makes a definite contribution to the country", responding to anti-Semitic comments that Stuyvesant had made three centuries prior.

By mid-1926, the Jaffe Art Theater was expected to open that September, but it remained closed past that date. Schwartz then planned to open the theater on November 11 with The Tenth Commandment, his adaptation of Goldfaden's play Thou Shalt Not Covet. Before the theater opened, the New York Herald Tribune called it "a lasting monument to Yiddish art", while The New York Times said the theater building "will be the most attractive amusement structure in that locality". The Louis N. Jaffe Art Theater opened on November 17, 1926, with The Tenth Commandment. In the opening-night program, Schwartz described the theater's opening as the "culmination of a lifelong dream". The opening-night visitors included theatrical personalities such as Daniel Frohman, Owen Davis, and Robert Milton, as well as non-theatrical notables such as Otto Kahn and Fannie Hurst. The theater, which cost $1 million to construct, was not officially completed until January 8, 1927.

=== Yiddish shows ===
The Jaffe Art Theatre was one of the last Yiddish theaters to open on Second Avenue, having been completed just as Yiddish theater was starting to decline. From 1926 to 1945, the Jaffe Art Theatre largely hosted Yiddish productions, though it changed names several times based on whichever company appeared there. It hosted not only straight plays but also revues, musicals, and operettas. Notable performers during this era included Joseph Buloff, Celia Adler, Luba Kadison, Ludwig Satz, Molly Picon, Menasha Skulnik, Joseph M. Rumshinsky, Ola Lilith, and Jacob Ben-Ami. Yiddish theatre historian Nahma Sandrow referred to the theater as "a temple" for Yiddish theatre, saying: "It was more than just a physical building; it really existed in people's cultural consciousnesses".

==== 1920s ====
For the rest of the 1926–1927 season, the Jaffe Art Theatre was occupied by limited runs of six productions: Mendele Spivak in 1926 and Her Crime, Reverend Doctor Silver, Yoske Musicanti, Wolves, and Menschen Shtoib in early 1927. After a summer hiatus, the theater then reopened the 1927–1928 season with the play Greenberg's Daughters in September 1927. The season also featured the play The Gardener's Dog, the first American production by Boris Glagolin's Moscow Revolution Theater. Other plays of that season included The Gold Diggers and On Foreign Soil in late 1927, as well as Alexander Pushkin and American Chasidim in early 1928. Schwartz appeared in many of these plays. Despite high expectations, the theater performed worse than expected in its first two seasons. Among the reasons for this were the rise of talking pictures, negotiations with performers' unions, and a decline in Jewish immigration.

In April 1928, Jaffe leased the theater to the Amboard Theatre Corporation, headed by Morris Lifschitz. The next month, the Louis N. Jaffe Art Theatre Corporation sold the theater to a client of Jacob I. Berman. The Yiddish Art Theatre moved out after two seasons because Schwartz had severed his agreement with Jaffe. The New York City Landmarks Preservation Commission (LPC) stated that the Jaffe Art Theatre remained vacant for the 1928–1929 season, but contemporary news reports indicate that the Yiddish Folk Theatre occupied the building during that season, starting with a dance recital in September 1928. The Yiddish Folks Theatre gave at least two other performances at the theater, both directed by Ludwig Satz. His Wife's Lover opened in October 1929, followed by If the Rabbi Wants that December.

==== 1930s ====
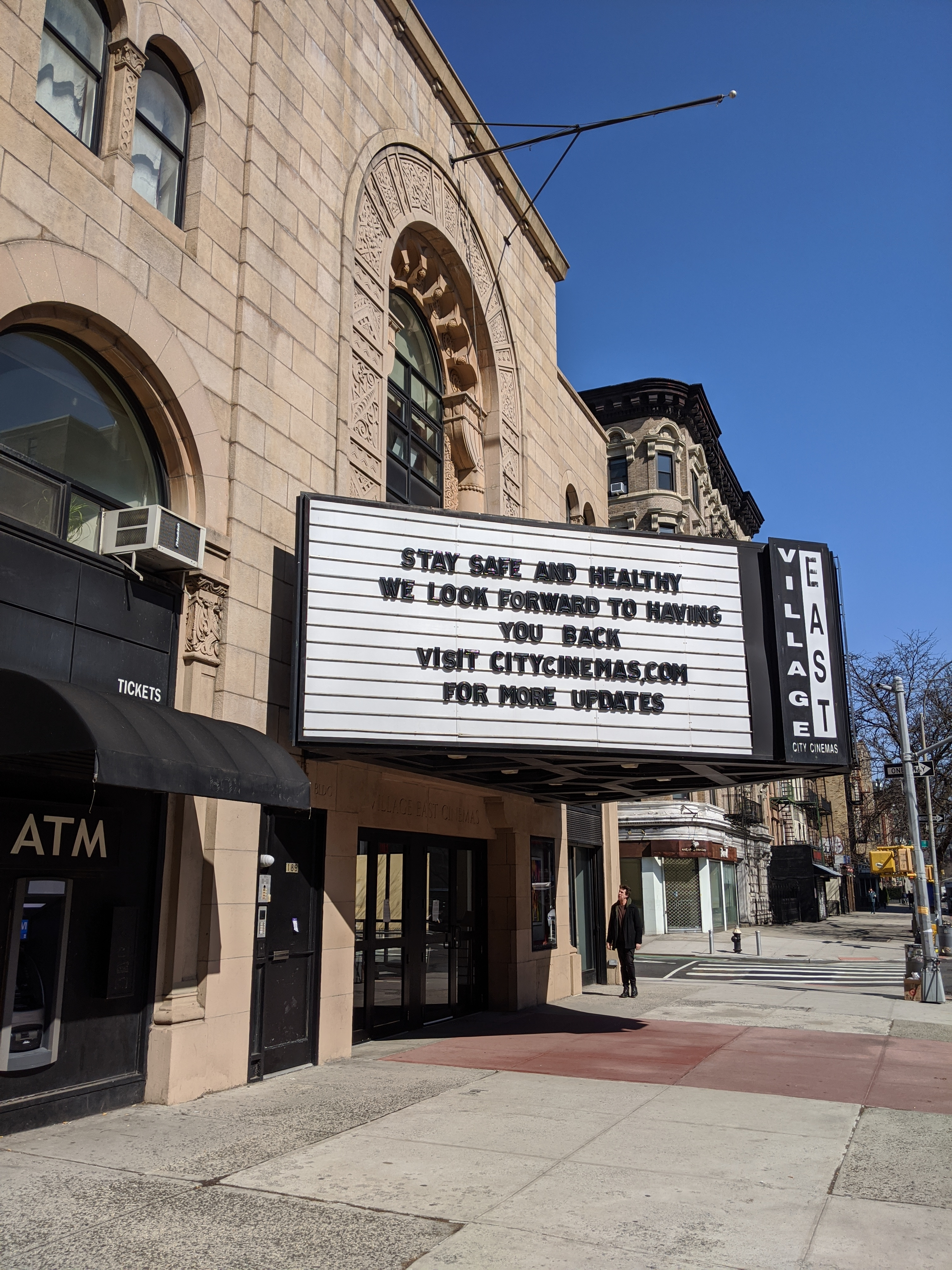
Marquee

The comedienne Molly Picon leased the Jaffe Art Theatre in June 1930, and it was renamed Molly Picon's Folks Theatre. Isaac Lipshitz acquired the theater in a foreclosure proceeding that August, and the play The Girl of Yesterday opened the next month, starring Picon. This was followed in January 1931 by the play The Love Thief, also starring Picon. Prosper Realty Corporation was recorded as taking ownership of the theater that February. Misha and Lucy German (also spelled Gehrman) leased the theater in May 1931, and the theater was rebranded yet again as the Germans' Folks Theatre. Under the German family's ownership, the theater hosted at least four performances: One Woman in 1931 and In a Tenement House, Pioneers, and Wedding Chains in 1932.

The Yiddish Art Theatre returned to the theater after Schwartz leased it for the 1932–1933 season. The company opened the season with Yoshe Kalb, which ran for 235 performances at the theater and was then performed on Broadway in English, for a total of 300 performances. Other Yiddish plays performed in 1932–1933 included Chayim Lederer, Legend of Yiddish King Lear, Bread, and Revolt. Schwartz also leased the theater for the 1933–1934 season, when he hosted Wise Men of Chelm, Josephus, and Modern Children. The theatrical company departed in April 1934, and the venue again became the Yiddish Folks Theatre, since Schwartz owned the rights to the "Yiddish Art Theatre" name. Under the direction of Joseph Buloff, the New York Art Troupe leased the theater for the 1934–1935 season, hosting eight plays there.

Menasha Skulnik and Joseph M. Rumshinsky signed a lease for the theater in April 1935, then announced plans to lease the theater as a movie house "until the fall". One newspaper proclaimed that the Yiddish Folks Theatre would become the world's first movie theater that hosted films exclusively in Yiddish, though it is unknown whether this ever happened. The first live show that Skulnik and Rumshinsky hosted at the theater was Fishel der Gerutener (English: "The Perfect Fishel"), which opened in September 1935. The men hosted three other shows: Schlemiehl in September 1936, Straw Hero in November 1936, and The Galician Rabbi in 1937.

==== Decline and film conversion ====
By the late 1930s, the popularity of Yiddish theatre was starting to wane. Various reasons were cited for the decline, including a slowdown in the number of Jewish immigrants after World War I and the fact that younger Jews were blending in with American culture. In addition, the city's Jewish population dispersed from the Lower East Side and East Village. By March 1937, just ten years after the Yiddish Folks Theatre had opened, independent film operators Weinstock and Hertzig planned to lease the theater for movies. Saulray Theatres Corporation leased the theater the next month, and it became a movie theater called the Century. The conversion occurred as similar Yiddish venues in the East Village and Lower East Side had become movie houses. Shortly after the Century reopened, its sound equipment was replaced. The theater went into foreclosure by September 1937 and was taken over by the Greater New York Savings Bank.

In June 1940, the Yiddish Folks Theatre leased the Century for one season. The Yiddish Folks Players then presented Sunrise that October, followed by Sixty Years of Yiddish Theatre, a musical in honor of Rumshinsky, in January 1941. The troupe's manager Jacob Wexler died in the middle of the 1940–1941 season, and Ola Lilith took over the troupe's management. The third and final Yiddish show of the season was A Favorn Vinkel ("The Forsaken Nook") in February 1941, with a special performance in honor of Ludwig Satz. The Century's operators announced that March that they would return the theater to a film policy, showing three American feature films every day. After a renovation, the Century screened the feature film Gone with the Wind that April. In addition, O'Gara & Co. Inc. was hired to lease out the office space on Second Avenue.

In 1942, the Greater New York Savings Bank leased the theater to the Century Theatre Company for ten years. The bank then leased the Jaffe Art Theatre in January 1944 to Benjamin Benito, who planned to stage Italian opera and vaudeville there. The Raynes Realty Company acquired the theater from the bank that September and discontinued Benito's lease. Jacob Ben-Ami's New Jewish Folk Theater leased the theater during the 1944–1945 season, operating it as the Century Theatre. Ben-Ami presented two shows, The Miracle of the Warsaw Ghetto by H. Leivick and We Will Live by David Bergelson, in what was the theater's last season as a Yiddish theatrical venue. By then, many Yiddish speakers had been murdered in the Holocaust, further contributing to the decline in Yiddish theatre. The Jaffe Art Theatre then reopened as a 1,082-seat movie theater, the Stuyvesant Theatre, around March 1946. The theater continued to screen films until 1953.

=== Off-Broadway use ===
==== Phoenix Theatre era ====
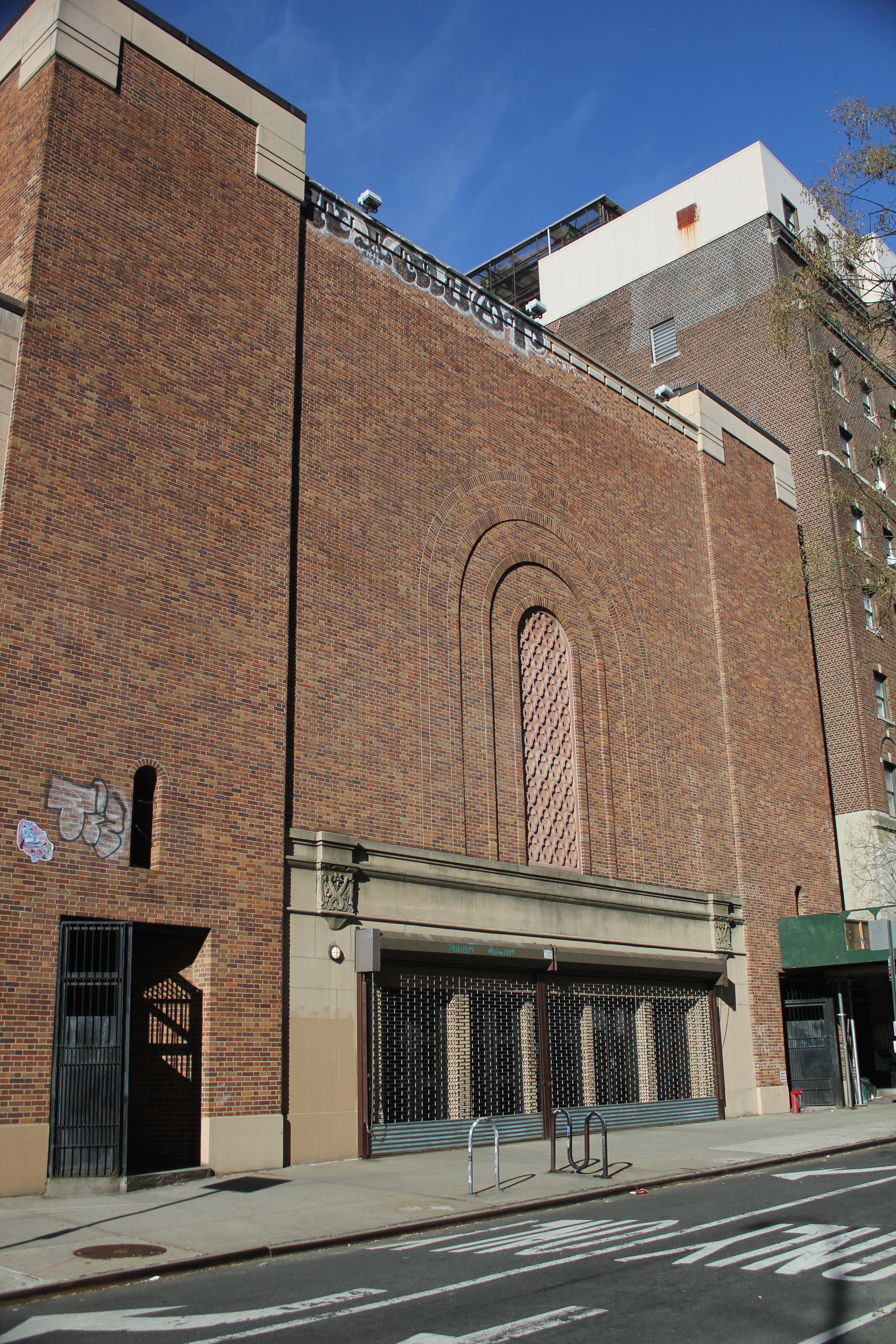
12th Street facade

In October 1953, Norris Houghton and T. Edward Hambleton formed the Phoenix Theatre company and leased the Jaffe Art Theatre, initially for a series of five plays. The Phoenix Theatre was a pioneering project in the development of off-Broadway, with a different approach to legitimate theatre than found on Broadway. Houghton and Hambleton had wanted a theater away from Broadway's Theater District. The Jaffe Art Theatre had appealed to them because it was newer than most Broadway venues and also because it was close to Stuyvesant Town–Peter Cooper Village, which had 30,000 residents. The group planned to charge a relatively cheap $1.20 to $3.00 per ticket; in return, performers would not be paid more than $100 per week, and each show would have a four-week limited run. A writer for Variety described Phoenix's formation as "one of the most important off-Broadway developments of recent years".

Phoenix's first production was Sidney Howard's play Madam, Will You Walk?, which opened in December 1953 with Hume Cronyn and Jessica Tandy. Other notable shows of the 1953–1954 season included Coriolanus, The Golden Apple, and The Seagull. The troupe's first season was successful; The Golden Apple transferred to Broadway, while The Seagull was sold out through its limited run. This prompted Houghton to renew his lease on the theater. The 1954–1955 season included the plays Sing Me No Lullaby, The Doctor's Dilemma, and The Master Builder, as well as the revue Phoenix '55. The theater also started hosting Sideshows, a set of "programs of diverse entertainment", on Monday nights during that season. Additionally, air-conditioning was installed in the theater around 1955 so shows could be presented there during the summer. The presence of the Phoenix Theatre and other off-Broadway companies on Second Avenue contributed to a revival of the former theatrical hub there.

During the 1955–1956 season, Phoenix presented plays from aspiring directors at the Jaffe Art Theatre as part of an experimental program. The regular season also included the plays Six Characters in Search of an Author, The Adding Machine, Miss Julie and The Stronger in repertory, and A Month in the Country. For the 1956–1957 season, Phoenix changed its policy to present exclusively revivals of 18th- and 19th-century works. The shows during this season included Saint Joan, Diary of a Scoundrel, The Good Woman of Setzuan, Measure for Measure, The Taming of the Shrew, and The Duchess of Malfi. After the season ended, Phoenix was reorganized as a nonprofit in an attempt to solve its financial troubles, and Theater Incorporated took over the theater building. After Phoenix's reorganization, the theater hosted several shows during the 1957–1958 season, including Mary Stuart, The Makropulos Secret, The Chairs and The Lesson in repertory, The Infernal Machine, The Two Gentlemen of Verona, The Broken Jug, La Malade Imaginaire, and three Molière plays in repertory. Phoenix continued to lose money and had a relatively small 3,000 subscribers during 1957–1958.

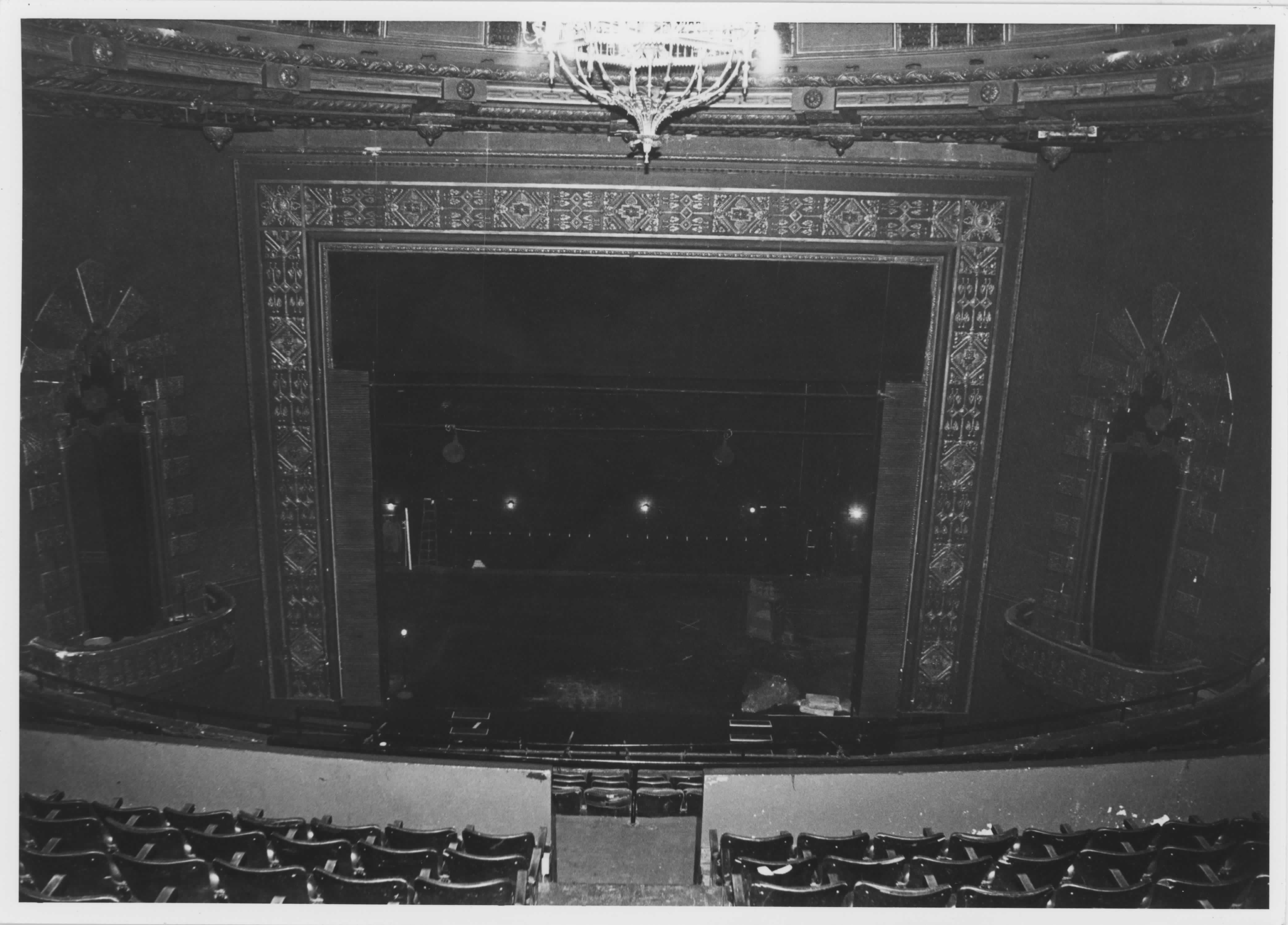
Interior of the theater from the balcony in 1985, prior to renovations.

For the 1958–1959 season, Phoenix decided to book plays by Nobel Prize-winning writers such as T. S. Eliot. The plays during that season included The Family Reunion, Britannicus, The Power and the Glory, The Beaux' Stratagem, and Once Upon a Mattress. After launching a drive to enroll new subscribers in April 1959, the theatrical company enrolled 9,000 subscribers and obtained $150,000 in subsidies by that June. This enabled Phoenix to pre-select all of the plays in a season, rather than booking plays as the season progressed, for the first time in the troupe's history. The theater then hosted plays such as Lysistrata, Peer Gynt, and part 1 and part 2 of Shakespeare's Henry IV during 1959–1960. Phoenix's last full season at the theater, in 1960–1961, consisted of H.M.S. Pinafore, She Stoops to Conquer, The Plough and the Stars, The Octoroon, and Hamlet. The company relocated to the much smaller 74th Street Theater in late 1961 after The Pirates of Penzance, the first play of the 1961–1962 season, was staged at the Second Avenue theater. This move was prompted by the fact that, after its first season, Phoenix had consistently operated at a loss and could not fill the Jaffe Art Theatre.

==== Burlesque and nude era ====
In November 1961, Michael Iannucci and Milton Warner leased the Jaffe Art Theatre for one year, with an option to renew for another year. The next month, the theater was renamed the Casino East Theater and reopened with a Yiddish-language show, Gezunt un Meshuga ("Hale and Crazy"). By then, it had 1,150 seats. In March 1962, Casino East hosted the satirical burlesque production This Was Burlesque starring Ann Corio. During this time, Iannucci managed the front of house, or the publicly accessible parts of the theater. Corio oversaw the stage and backstage operations, with a speaker in her dressing room that allowed her to hear everything on stage. The revue was successful, ultimately lasting 1,509 performances at the Casino. This Was Burlesque ultimately relocated to the Hudson Theatre on Broadway in March 1965. Corio said that tourists could not find Casino East and that ticket sellers could more easily sell tickets to the show if it were on Broadway.

Afterward, Casino East became the Gayety Theater, the only burlesque theater in Manhattan. The venue was operated by Leroy Griffith, who had opened the burlesque venue there following the success of Corio's show. The operator charged $4 admission, higher than at the Hudson Theatre. Fittingly, director William Friedkin shot the burlesque scenes for The Night They Raided Minsky's at the theater in 1967. The off-Broadway production Oh! Calcutta!, a revue in which all the cast members were nude, was announced for the theater in April 1969, upon which point the venue was renamed the Eden Theater. The revue's producer George Platt explained the renaming by saying, "We're not doing a burlesque show, we're doing a legitimate show." Oh! Calcutta! opened at the theater in June 1969. While the Eden was as large as a standard Broadway theater, Oh! Calcutta! used an off-Broadway contract that limited the audience to 499 seats; nonetheless, the show made a profit at the Eden. The revue moved to Broadway's Belasco Theatre in February 1971 after running for 704 performances.

==== Yiddish revival and legitimate shows ====
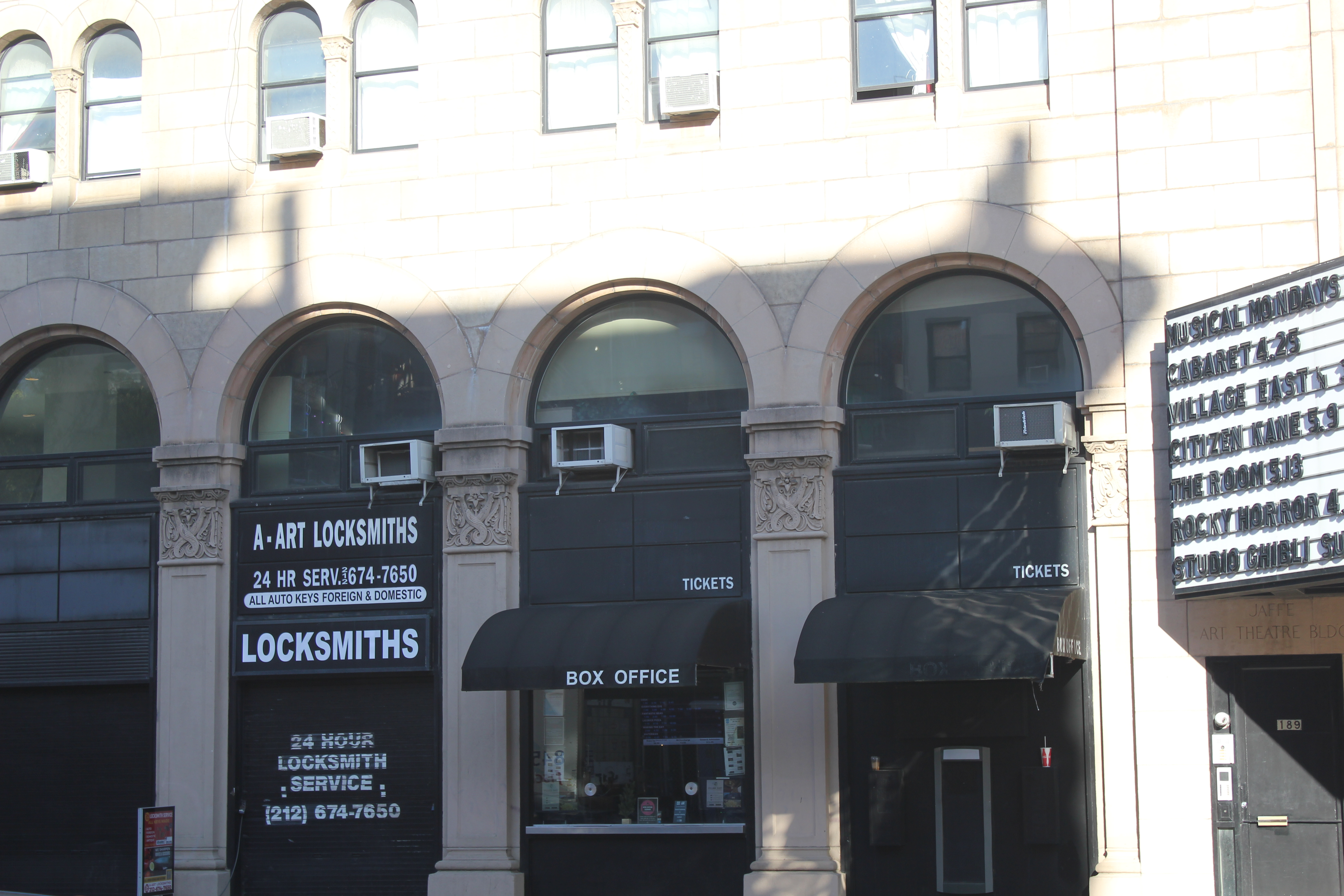
Storefronts next to the theater's main entrance

In March 1971 the Broadway musical Man of La Mancha moved from the Martin Beck Theatre to the Eden. La Mancha operated under a Broadway contract, which allowed all of the Eden's seats to be used; the musical moved to Broadway's Mark Hellinger Theatre after three months. That June, Jacob Jacobs leased the Eden with plans to host Yiddish shows there. Next, the rock musical Grease opened in February 1972 under a Broadway contract that allowed all seats to be used. The musical moved to the Broadhurst Theatre that June and later became Broadway's longest-running musical. By then, Jewish Nostalgic Productions was raising funds for a series of Yiddish plays at the Eden.

The revue Crazy Now opened at the Eden in September 1972, followed the next month by a revival of Yoshe Kalb. In early 1973, the theater also hosted a dance special by Larry Richardson and the Broadway musical Smith, the latter of which relocated to the Alvin Theatre. Jewish Nostalgic Productions staged several more shows, of which three had more than 100 performances. For the 1973–1974 season, the Eden was occupied by Aleichem's play Hard To Be a Jew. This was followed in the 1974–1975 season by another Aleichem play, Dos groyse gevins ("The Big Winner"), as well as a short run of A Wedding in Shtetel. Senyar Holding Company, a firm owned by Martin Raynes, took ownership of the theater in March 1975. During the 1975–1976 season, the Eden hosted Sylvia Regan's musical The Fifth Season. The theater had become the 12th Street Cinema by mid-1976, but this use only lasted a short time.

=== Multimedia venue ===
==== Entermedia Theatre ====
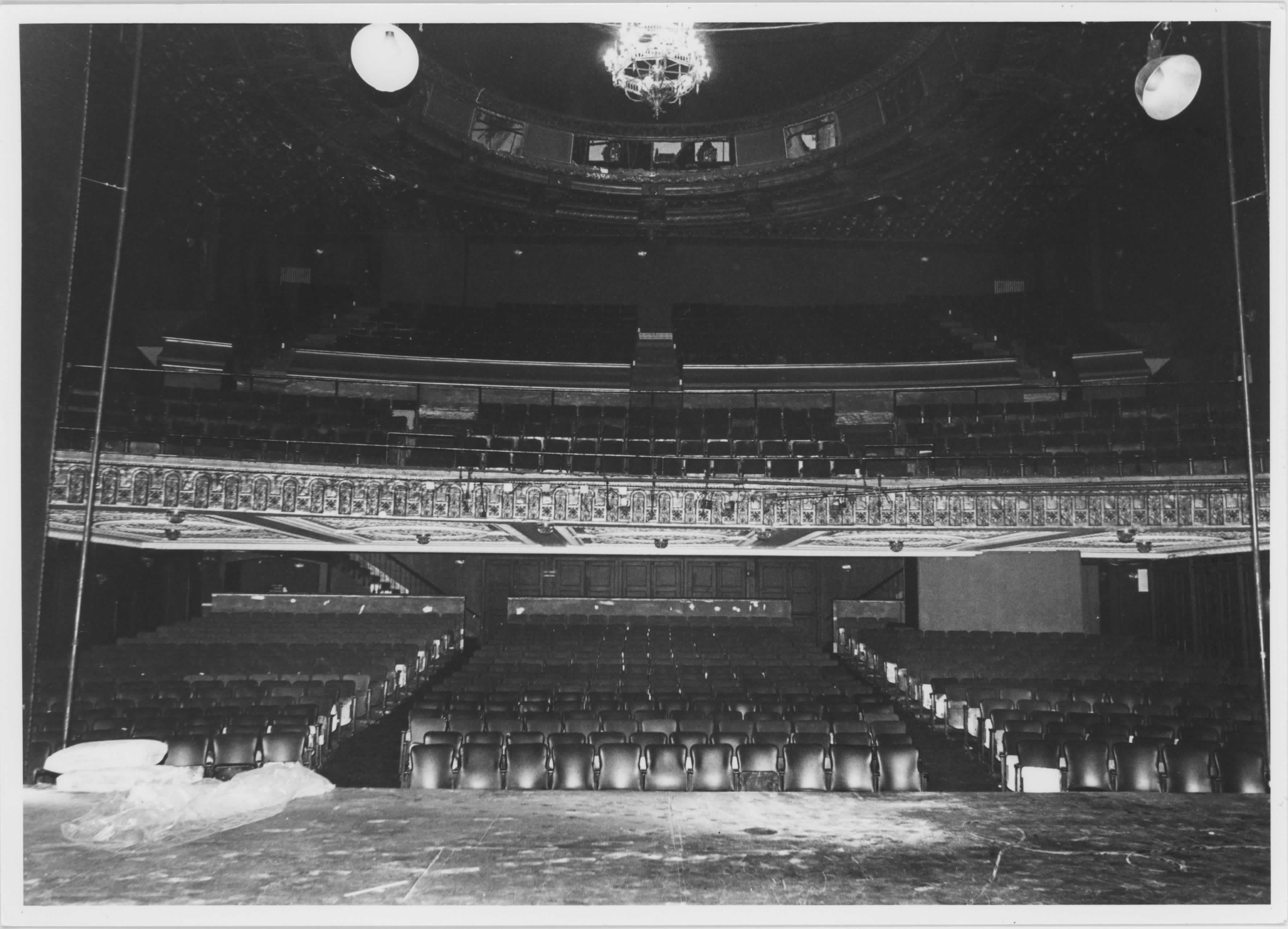
Interior of the theater in 1985 before renovations

By September 1977, the Jaffe Art Theatre was known as the Entermedia Theatre. The theater reopened the next month with The Possessed, a dance special by Pearl Lang. Its operator Entermedia presented not only films but also dance, experimental legitimate shows, and other events. Among the Entermedia's early shows was the musical The Best Little Whorehouse in Texas, which opened in 1978 and subsequently transferred to Broadway, as well as the musical God Bless You, Mr. Rosewater in 1979. The theater also hosted events such as a Talking Heads concert, an independent film festival, a jazz showcase, and a samurai film festival. The musical Joseph and the Amazing Technicolor Dreamcoat, which later transferred to Broadway, opened at the Entermedia in 1981 and was so successful that its audience was allowed to use all the seats. Other popular shows at the theater were the 1982 play Lennon and the 1983 musical Taking My Turn. The Jaffe Art Theatre was added to the National Register of Historic Places on September 19, 1985. The New York City Landmarks Preservation Commission also considered protecting the theater as a landmark in 1985 and 1986 but did not make a decision.

==== Second Avenue Theater ====
Entermedia left the theater in 1985, and the venue was leased to M Square Productions, which renamed it the Second Avenue Theater. It was one of M Square's three off-Broadway houses. M Square's managing director Alan J. Schuster said the company wanted "to have a legitimate theater and a film theater at the Second Avenue" without incurring the exorbitant costs of Broadway theatre contracts. The movie theater would have been above the legitimate theater, but these plans never materialized. The Second Avenue hosted Zalmen Mlotek and Moishe Rosenfeld's bilingual revue The Golden Land, which opened in November 1985 and ran for 277 regular performances. (Note: Landmarks Preservation Commission 1993, p. 21, counts both previews and regular performances. For example, The Golden Land is counted as having 295 performances (including 18 previews), and The Chosen is recorded as having 58 performances (including 52 previews).) For the 1986–1987 season, the theater staged the musical Have I Got a Girl for You!, which opened in November 1986, and the musical Staggerlee, which opened in March 1987. The theater also hosted a tribute to the late off-Broadway actor Charles Ludlam in mid-1987. The Chaim Potok play The Chosen opened in January 1988 but flopped with just six regular performances.

=== Village East use ===
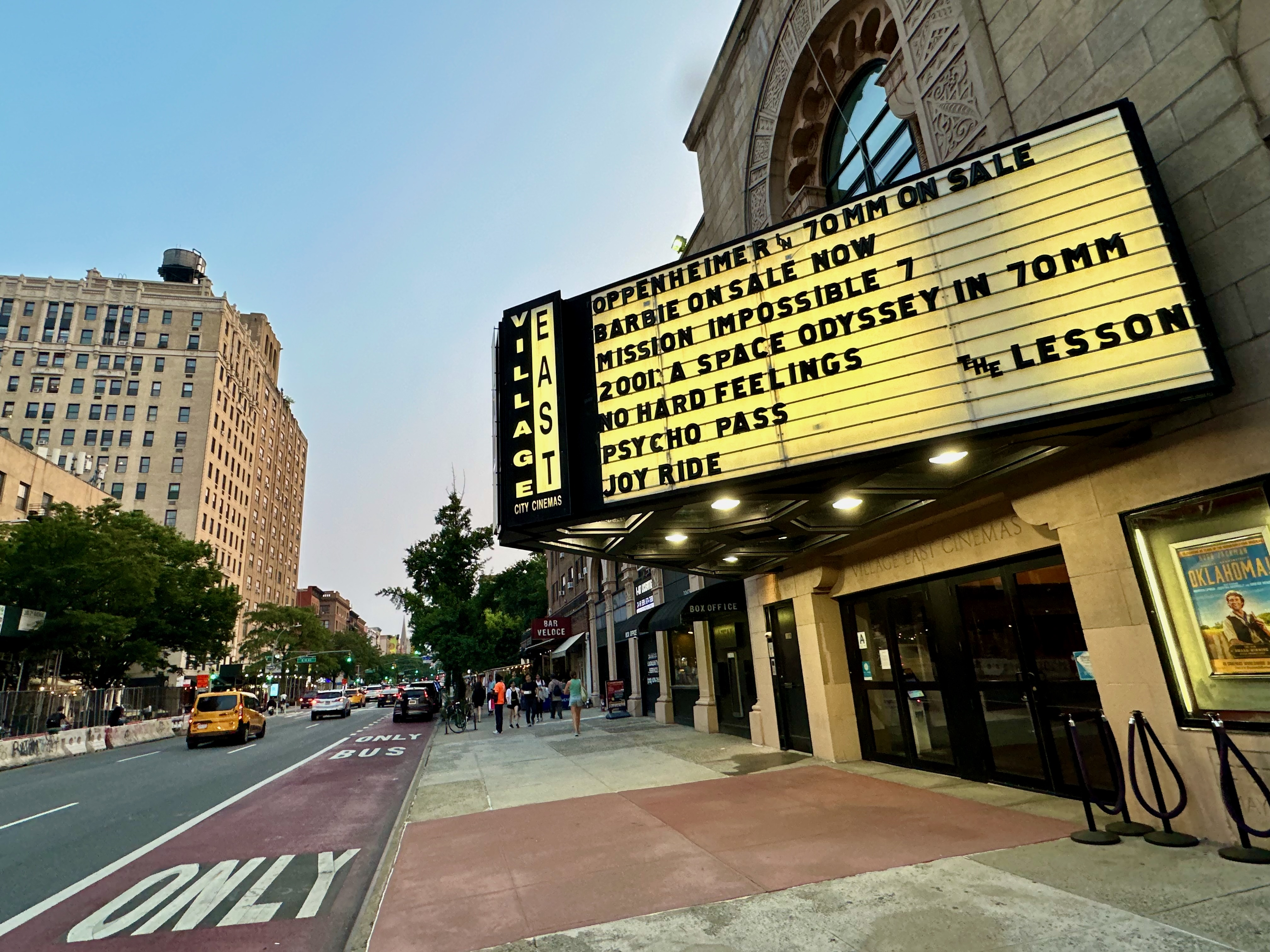
Announcement of 70 mm screening (July 2023)

The failure of The Chosen had been particularly devastating for M Square, which had spent three years creating the play and could no longer afford to continue operating the Second Avenue Theater. The venue was the only surviving Yiddish theater building on Second Avenue, as well as one of the few off-Broadway houses in the East Village. In 1988, M Square leased the theater to City Cinemas, a branch of Reading International, for use as a movie theater called Village East. City Cinemas converted the auditorium into a seven-screen multiplex. Averitt Associates preserved the balcony but split the orchestra and backstage areas into six screens. The renovation had to conform with historic-preservation guidelines because Village East was still being considered for city-landmark designation. The architects used archival photos to restore the theater's design features.

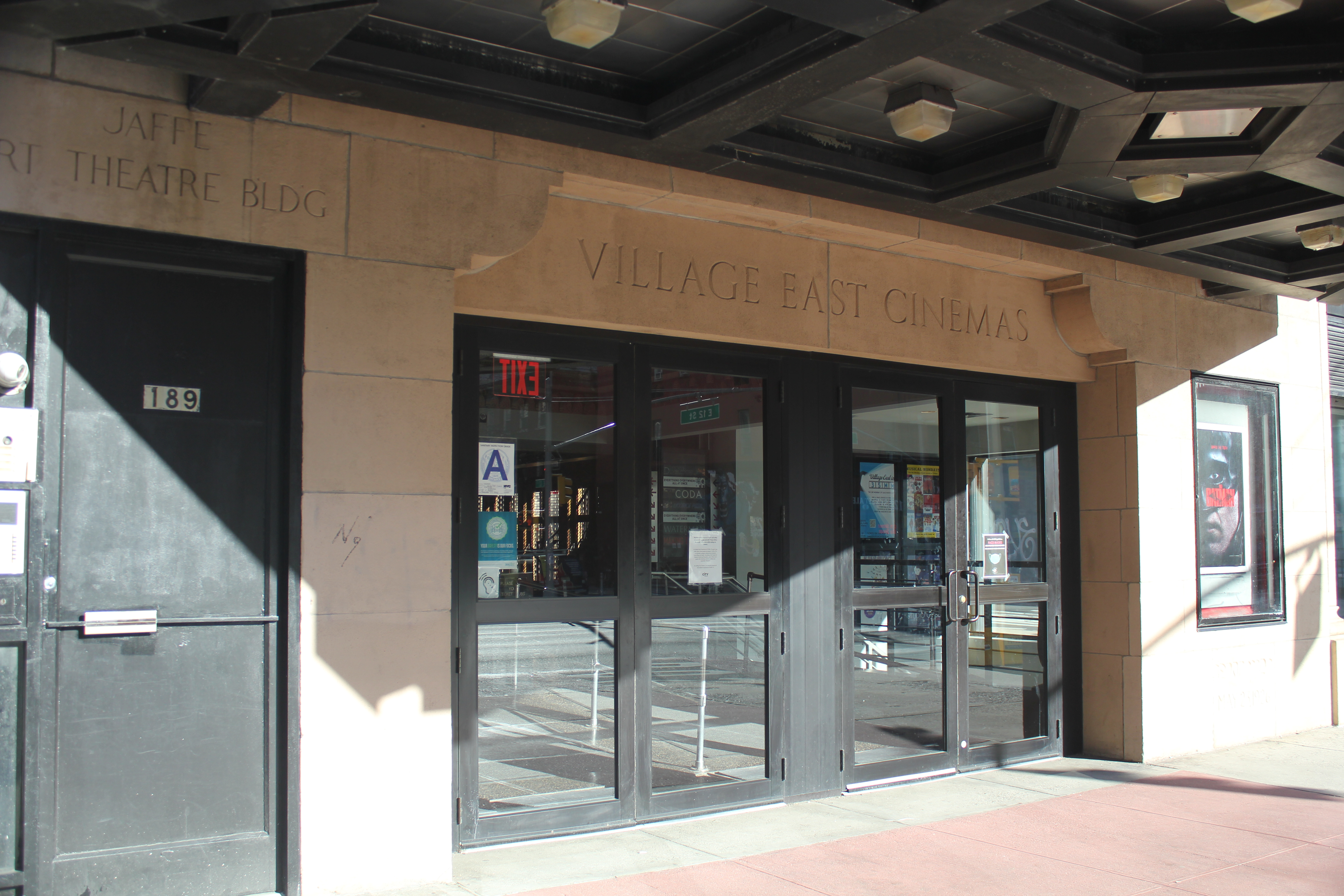
Main entrance to the theater

The project ultimately cost $8 million. Village East Cinemas opened on February 22, 1991, initially with only five screens in operation. The LPC designated the exterior and interior of the theater as a landmark in 1993. Since then, it has shown a mixture of Hollywood productions and indie films. The Village East Cinema also shows films that originally opened at the Angelika Film Center, an arthouse chain that is also an arm of Reading International. The multiplex also hosted movies that were screened as part of the annual New York International Children's Film Festival.

EverGreene Architectural Arts restored the theater at the beginning of 2015. The work involved replacing some of the historical design features that had deteriorated over the years. The theater closed temporarily in March 2020 due to the COVID-19 pandemic in New York City. When the theater reopened on March 5, 2021, it was rebranded as Village East by Angelika. After Village East reopened, several movies were screened in 70 mm. A new bar and kitchen were announced for the theater in late 2021. By 2022, the theater generally screened newly released films, though it sometimes showed revivals as well. Among these was the premiere of Tommy Wiseau's second film Big Shark in 2023.

== Notable productions ==
Productions are listed by the year of their first performance. This list only includes theatrical shows; it does not include films, burlesque shows, or other types of live performance.

Notable productions at the theater
Opening year	Name	Refs.
1954	Coriolanus	
1954	The Golden Apple	
1954	The Seagull	
1954	Sing Me No Lullaby	
1955	The Doctor's Dilemma	
1955	The Master Builder	
1955	Marcel Marceau	
1955	Six Characters in Search of an Author	
1956	The Adding Machine	
1956	Miss Julie/The Stronger	(Note: Miss Julie and The Stronger were performed in repertory.)
1956	A Month in the Country	
1956	Saint Joan	
1956	Diary of a Scoundrel	
1956	The Good Woman of Setzuan	
1957	Measure for Measure	
1957	The Taming of the Shrew	
1957	The Duchess of Malfi	
1957	Mary Stuart	
1957	The Makropulos Secret	
1958	The Chairs/The Lesson	(Note: The Chairs and The Lesson were performed in repertory.)
1958	The Infernal Machine	
1958	The Two Gentlemen of Verona	
1958	The Broken Jug	
1958	La Malade Imaginaire	
1958	Evening of Three Farces	(Note: Composed of three plays: The Forced Marriage, The Imaginary Cuckold, and The Jealousy of the Barbouille.)
1958	The Family Reunion	
1958	Britannicus	
1958	The Power and the Glory	
1959	The Beaux' Stratagem	
1959	Once Upon a Mattress	
1959	Lysistrata	
1960	Peer Gynt	
1960	Henry IV, Part 1	
1960	Henry IV, Part 2	
1960	H.M.S. Pinafore	
1960	She Stoops to Conquer	
1960	The Plough and the Stars	
1961	The Octoroon	
1961	Hamlet	
1961	The Pirates of Penzance	
1969	Oh! Calcutta!	
1971	Man of La Mancha	
1972	Grease	
1978	The Best Little Whorehouse in Texas	
1979	God Bless You, Mr. Rosewater	
1981	Joseph and the Amazing Technicolor Dreamcoat	

== See also ==
- List of New York City Designated Landmarks in Manhattan below 14th Street
- National Register of Historic Places listings in Manhattan below 14th Street
