= Dybbuk (disambiguation) =

A dybbuk is a malicious possessing spirit in Kabbalah and European Jewish folklore.

Dybbuk may also refer to:

- Dybbuk box, a wine cabinet said to contain such a spirit
- Dybbuk (Dungeons & Dragons), a role-playing game monster
- The Dybbuk, a 1914 play by S. Ansky
  - A Dybbuk, Tony Kushner's 1997 adaptation of this play
  - Dybbuk (ballet), a 1974 adaptation of the play
  - The Dybbuk (film), a 1937 adaptation of the play
  - The Dybbuk (opera), a 1951 adaptation of the play
  - The Dybbuk (The Play of the Week), a 1960 television production
- Dybbuk (film), a 2021 Indian horror film
- Zuby Nehty, an all-female rock group from the Czech Republic, formerly known as "Dybbuk"
- "Dybbuk", a song by Japanese musician and songwriter Gackt
- "Dybbuk", track by Sushin Shyam from Ezra, 2017
