= The Dybbuk (The Play of the Week) =

- The Play of the Week episode
- Episode no.: Season 2 Episode 2
- Directed by: Sidney Lumet
- Written by: Sholom Ansky (play); Joseph Liss (writer)
- Original air date: October 3, 1960
- Running time: 104 minutes

Episode chronology
← Previous "Henry IV"	Next → "Legend of Lovers"

"The Dybbuk" is a 1960 television production of the Russian play The Dybbuk by Sholom Ansky, which was authored between 1913 and 1916 and is considered a Yiddish classic, with Cambridge University Press calling it "probably the most performed of any Yiddish play". It was directed by Sidney Lumet for The Play of the Week from an adaptation into English by Joseph Liss. The program, starring Carol Lawrence (who had just become a star after playing Maria in the original Broadway production of West Side Story), aired on October 3, 1960.

== Plot ==
The wandering student Channon arrives in the town of Brinitz, where he intensively studies the Kabbalah and fasts every day except Shabbat in an attempt to gain such purity that his prayers will be heard. While studying in the synagogue, he overhears Sender enter and announce that his daughter, Channon's love Leah, has been betrothed to Menashe. Channon kills himself in despair before the altar.

When Leah visits Channon's grave to invite him to the wedding, she becomes possessed by his malevolent spirit. When Sender brings her to Rabbi Azrael to ask for his help, Rabbi Azrael asks whether Sender has done anything to offend the dybbuk. Sender claims that he has not, but upon further questioning Rabbi Azrael learns that Sender indeed had a personal relationship with Channon before he died. Rabbi Azrael speaks with Channon's spirit through Leah but he refuses to leave because he wants to remain with his destined love.

Rabbi Azrael seeks the permission of Rabbi Samson, the great rabbi of the city, to exorcise the dybbuk. Rabbi Samson tells him that Nissen, who died twenty years earlier, has appeared to him three times in his dreams to tell him that Sender has not fulfilled a contract with him. Rabbi Azrael sends Mikoel to the graveyard to notify Nissen's spirit that he is being summoned to the supreme rabbinical court in nearby Miropol.

At the trial, Nissen's spirit reminds Sender that in their youth they were great friends and they married their wives on the same day, after which they agreed that if they had children then these children would wed. Nissen's spirit continues that Channon sought Leah's hand but was rejected by Sender, who sought a better life for his daughter with a wealthier suitor. Rabbi Azrael rules that the agreement is not binding because it applies to objects which did not exist yet when the agreement was made, but explains that the idea was put in Channon's mind that Leah was his destined bride and that Sender's actions have caused Nissen and Channon to be unable to find peace in the afterlife with no one to say Kaddish for them so he rules that Sender must give half of his possessions to the poor and every year light a candle and say Kaddish for the two deceased men as if they were his own family.

Rabbi Azrael performs a ritual to exorcise the dybbuk, during which he instructs Sender to say Kaddish for Channon's departing spirit. After being comforted by her mother, Leah holds a final conversation with Channon and promises to remember him. She begins to see him and asks him to come to her, but he cannot. She then says that she will come to him and dies on the spot.

== Cast ==
- Theodore Bikel as Sender
- Sylvia Davis as Frade
- Ludwig Donath as Rabbi Azrael
- Vincent Gardenia as Nissen
- Stefan Gierasch as Yonya
- Theo Goetz as Meyer
- Carol Lawrence as Leah
- Eli Mintz as Nachmon
- Jerry Rockwood as Ilya
- Gene Saks as Mikoel
- Milton Selzer as Messenger
- Michael Shillo as Rabbi Samson
- Michael Tolan as Channon

== Release ==
The television play was broadcast on ABC as season 2, episode 2 of its The Play of the Week series on October 3, 1960.

The television play was later released on the streaming service Shudder on May 4, 2020.

== Reception ==
Reviewer Ricky Chiang wrote, "This was not only a tale of young tragic love, but also a tale to teach Jewish values and traditions, to obey the father, to not forget promises, and in the end the rabbi always has the final word. You could tell the play was written to instill these values for a Jewish audience, that without respect and obedience to elders only leads to tragedy."
