= The Dyke and the Dybbuk =

1993 novel by Ellen Galford

- First edition
- Author: Ellen Galford
- Language: English
- Genre: Satire, fantasy, Jewish folklore, lesbian fiction
- Published: Virago Press, 1993
- Publication place: United Kingdom
- ISBN: 9781853814495

The Dyke and the Dybbuk is a 1993 novel by Ellen Galford.

The novel is a satirical story based on Jewish folklore, in which an ancient dybbuk – a malicious possessing spirit – returns to haunt a modern-day London lesbian.

== Plot summary ==
Two hundred years ago, Anya's lover, Gittel, betrayed her and married a Torah scholar. Anya, bent on revenge, conjured up a curse according to which Gittel and every first-born female descendant for 33 generations would be possessed by a dybbuk and bear only daughters. The dybbuk Kokos gets assigned this job by the Head Office, but runs into trouble when the family gets help from her nemesis, the Sage of Limnititzk. The sage drives Kokos out of Gittel and traps her in a tree. Two centuries later, a bolt of lightning releases Kokos, but she has a hard time adjusting to the 20th century. Kokos, who is facing dismissal by the Head Office - now a multinational high-tech corporation - tracks down Gittel's descendant, Rainbow Rosenbloom, a political, lesbian film-critic and taxi driver. Rainbow, however, turns out to be far from an easy soul to haunt. If the dybbuk's job is to drive the possessed person mad, Kokos is at a loss as to what to do with a person who is already considered more than a little crazy by her friends and family. The approach Kokos chooses is to remake Rainbow into the ultimate "Nice Jewish Girl". Rainbow, who is now falling for a beautiful, and straight, orthodox woman, now even considers marrying a man and getting back to her religious roots to be close to her - a plan Kokos is pleased with, because it will give her future generations to possess.

== Themes ==
According to Mary Keller, "The book is a lesbian exploration of permeability, porosity, identity within contemporary Judaism". She writes that the name of the novel intentionally refers to the famous play and film "The Dybbuk" by S. Ansky, in order to appropriate the Jewish tradition which in itself rejects the lesbian identity and the novel's core concept of a dybbuk, to harness its transgressive nature, for "the promise of transformation" desired by contemporary feminist writers. Howard Schwartz emphasizes the transformative nature of this choice as well, noting that in the contemporary version, as exemplified by Galford, the dybbuk emerges as a sympathetic character, unlike the original tale.

== Reception ==
The novel was warmly received by the LGBT community and the literary community in general. Kirkus Reviews called it "A fun, feisty, feminist romp through Jewish folklore", and lauded its "craft, camp, and chutzpah". The Goodreads review calls it "hilarious", and the Jewniverse culture review termed the novel a not-to-be-missed "feisty romp through gay and Jewish history". The Times called it a "highly entertaining farce".

== Awards ==
- Lambda Literary Award, 1994
- Gay, Lesbian, and Bisexual Book Award, 1995

== Publishing History ==
The novel was first published in the UK in 1993 by Little, Brown Book Group and Virago Press. It was published in the US the following year, by Seal Press, who issued a new edition in 1998.

The novel was translated into Hebrew by Dana G. Peleg, as "הדייקית והדיבוק" (Hadaikit ve Hadibuk) in 2000, published by Shufra Publishing, Tel Aviv.
