= Dybbuk (ballet) =

Ballet by Jerome Robbins to music by Leonard Bernstein

Dybbuk is a ballet made by New York City Ballet ballet master Jerome Robbins to Leonard Bernstein's eponymous music and taking S. Ansky's play The Dybbuk as a source. The premiere took place on 16 May 1974, at New York State Theater, Lincoln Center, with scenery by Rouben Ter-Arutunian, costumes by Patricia Zipprodt and lighting by Jennifer Tipton. A revision of the choreography and the score was made later the same year; the ballet was renamed Dybbuk Variations and received its own premiere in November.

== Premise ==
Yiddish playwright S. Ansky’s The Dybbuk (1912–1919) centers around Khonnon and Leah, a young couple that has been promised for marriage to each other by their fathers before they were born. Before the wedding, Leah’s father breaks off the marriage with the penniless Khonnon, who dies instantly of a broken heart. However, Khonnon has his revenge when he enters Leah’s body in the form of an evil spirit called a dybbuk, which makes her act as though she is possessed. After rabbinical intervention, the likes of which Ansky had seen in exorcism-like ceremonies among the Hasidim when traveling through present day Belarus, Leah is forced to decide whether to marry the richer man or enter an unworldly union with the ghost of Khonnon. She chooses the latter to great dramatic effect at the fall of the curtain.

== Composition ==
In Dybbuk Bernstein used a Kabbalistic tree to derive some of the melodic motives. By Kabbalistic tradition, each letter of the Hebrew alphabet has its own numerical value. The name of the female lead in Dybbuk, Leah, is equal to the numerical value of thirty-six. Bernstein focused his composition on the divisions of thirty-six and eighteen (the numerical value of the Hebrew word chai (חַי), meaning "life"), each multiples of the nine—the number of notes including the repetition of the top note in a symmetrical octatonic scale. The result lent itself well to dodecaphonic composition but baffled critics, causing Oliver Knussen to write in Tempo, "…it is surprising to encounter Bernstein making use of numerical formulas derived from the Kabbalah… and producing his most austerely contemporary-sounding score to date." Jack Gottlieb commented, "The Dybbuk ballet (1974), however, marks a kind of departure for the composer since its concern with numerology results in far more hard-edged dissonant music (sometimes 12-tone) than in any of his other works."

The music is, to a considerable extent, based on serial ideas – though, as ever, there are tonal moments. Inevitably, as in all Bernstein, these represent the ‘good’ characters, whilst the former are associated with the ‘evil’ forces at work in this disturbing tale of arranged marriage, bodily possession and death – based on the drama by Shlomo Ansky.

== Original cast ==
- Patricia McBride
- Tracey Bennett
- Helgi Tomasson
- Bart Cook
- Victor Castelli
- Hermes Conde

== Notable recordings ==
- New York City Ballet Orchestra, Bernstein, David Johnson and John Ostendorf (1974)

== Reviews ==
- NY Times, Clive Barnes, May 17, 1974
- NY Times, Clive Barnes, June 11, 1974
- NY Times, Clive Barnes, December 1, 1974

== Articles ==
- NY Times, Clive Barnes, May 26, 1974
- NY Times, Richard F. Shepard, May 9, 1974
- NY Times, Anna Kisselgoff, May 12, 1974
- NY Times, Deborah Jowitt, December 8, 1974
