= The Dybbuk: An opera in Yiddish =

Opera

The Dybbuk: An opera in Yiddish. The poster

The Dybbuk: An Opera in Yiddish is an opera in three acts by American composer Solomon Epstein. The libretto was adapted by the composer from S. Ansky's 1914 play The Dybbuk and is allegedly the world's first original Yiddish- language opera. It was premiered and recorded at the Suzanne Dellal Center for Dance and Theater, Tel Aviv, and at Ben-Gurion University, Beersheba, in May 1999. The opera was staged in a 70 minute abridged version using the composer's piano-vocal score. It has not yet been produced with a full orchestra.

Yiddish, spoken mainly by European Jews up until World War II, is now an endangered language. Before rehearsals began, most company members did not know Yiddish.

The Israeli production was directed and produced by Rachel Michaeli and conducted by Ronen Borshevsky. The premiere production was supported by The Lerner Yiddish Fund and Ben-Gurion University, with cast of singers and actors accompanied by pianist Irit Rub-Levy, featuring Swedish soprano Camilla Griehsel (Leah) and Yossi Aridan (Hanan), Bracha Kol (Freida), David Sebba (Reb Azriel), Avi Yasinovski (Hanokh), Morry Gross (Sender), Aremelite: Dorit Talmi, Michael Engel, Sammy Fugler, Oded Gaon, Eyal Harel and Hezi Shohet, corepetiteur was Ethan Schmeisser, Yiddish coaching was Hadassa Ben-Heim, lighting by Afif Adries, costumes by Dvori Topaz. The production was dedicated to the memory of the Italian opera singer and director, Frederico Davia.

The opera's premiere received international media attention. Opera, the London monthly wrote: "One of the most original and interesting projects this year". The Dybbuk: An opera in Yiddish, is a subject of a chapter in the Italian book Esotismi musicali del Dibbuk by Aloma Bardi, and appears on the cover. The book, about the musical adaptations of Ansky's play, was published in 2014 by the University of Naples.
