= Play of the Week =

Play of the Week may refer to:

- ITV Play of the Week, British TV anthology series broadcast from 1956 to 1966
- The Play of the Week, American TV anthology series broadcast from 1959 to 1961

== See also ==
- Play of the Month, British TV anthology series broadcast from 1965 to 1983
