= Joseph Liss =

American television dramatist

- Born: September 2, 1911; Odesa, Russian Empire.
- Died: May 20, 1988 (aged 76); New York City, New York, U.S.
- Education: Public School No. 37 (aka Sylvester Malone School)
- Occupations: Producer, screenwriter

Joseph Liss (September 2, 1911 – May 20, 1988) was an American radio and television scriptwriter and editor.

== Early life and career ==
Born in Odesa, on September 2, 1911, Liss was raised in Brooklyn, where he attended Public School, No. 37 (aka Sylvester Malone School).

Entertainment writer Leonard Lyons, writing in 1960 (more than two decades after the fact), informed readers that Liss's entry into the ranks of professional writers, circa late 1930s, had been both utterly unforeseen and purely expedient, arrived at wholly by means of simple elimination; an arrival, moreover, that had the added consequence of connecting Liss to yet another future dramatist of note.

Joe Liss, now one of the most successful writers in television, started writing by accident. During the depression days he applied for a job at the WPA offices. There were several lines of applicants. The shortest line was for the "Writers" Section, and so he went there, and was hired. Liss was assigned to work with another young writer, Arthur Miller. (Note: In his 1987 memoir, Timebends: A Life, Arthur Miller makes a few mentions of their early connection, acknowledging Liss as "a friend and radio writer then working for the Library of Congress Folklore Division", and later mentioning that it was "through my friend Joe Liss, who worked in the radio division of the library" that he himself, had, "in desperation", later secured employment with the LOC.)

Liss's radio career commenced in 1939 with scripts for Columbia Workshop; by 1941, he had joined the Library of Congress, alongside archivist Alan Lomax, and engineer Jerome Wiesner, serving as the script editor for the Library's Radio Research Project. under whose auspices he contributed to programs such as Report to the Nation and Human Adventure.

Though relatively new to the field of theatrical adaptation of literary classics, his attention to detail regarding this newfound expertise was, on at least one notable occasion, so thorough as to have unforeseen consequences, as when Studio One producer Worthington Miner, without reading the particular classic in question, Kipling's The Light That Failed (one of the producer's self-avowed personal referred—albeit with the crucial qualifier, "as a boy"), had "simply shipped it off to Joe Liss, one of our writers, for adaptation".

Imagine my fury on discovering that Joe Liss, for no reason I could fathom, had so jazzed up the end that the whole thing had become sleazy and salacious. Into Kipling's tender and beautiful love story, he'd introduced a Lesbian theme. Lesbian? Kipling? [...] I was still so angry when Joe got to my office I lit into him before he had a chance to speak. [...] "Tony," he said gently as I finally gave him an opening, "Tony, baby, when did you last read The Light That Failed? [...] Read it, baby. I didn't add that Lesbian angle. Kipling did. I just softened it." [I grudgingly did as he suggested, and] Joe was right. Kipling hadn't even minced his words. That was the story Kipling had meant to tell, and he'd told it. I never again scheduled an adaptation without re-reading the original.

Arguably the pinnacle of Liss's Studio One output is his June 1949 adaptation of S. Ansky's The Dybbuk. Produced by Miner, directed by Paul Nickell, starring Arnold Moss, and featuring "special choreography" by Felicia Sorel, the broadcast was dubbed "the most satisfying dramatic performance I have yet seen on the new medium" by New Republic critic Saul Carson, who goes on to commend Liss and Miner's "thorough grasp of television's possibilities" and concludes with the observation, "It would be tragic if the Liss-Miner 'Dybbuk' were relegated to the status of one-shot; it should be in television's repertory."

Carson was similarly impressed the following year with Liss's Philco Playhouse episode, "Ann Rutledge" (ostensibly an adaptation of the like-named, 24-minute Cavalcade of America episode that had aired in 1949, scripted by the much better known Norman Corwin, with whom Liss is credited jointly here).

Corwin's contribution consisted of his name (the sponsors insisted on that) and dozen lines or so of dialogue. The play was an original, by Joseph Liss. Probably the busiest dramatist on TV this season, Liss's opportunities for original writing are rare: most often, he is held down to adaptations, like that of Christopher La Farge's The Sudden Guest, which he had to fit to the home screen a week earlier. On this occasion, however, he got his chance, and he used it well. Grace Kelly, who played the title role, and Stephen Courtleigh as the young Lincoln, were entirely credible. 'Ann Rutledge' is not only a fitting tribute to the martyred president; it was also a commentary on what TV might receive from its better writers.

Liss's drama, "The Inward Eye" (aka "The Inward Horizon"), was produced by Goodyear Playhouse, starring Phyllis Kirk, Philip Abbott, David White, and Steven Hill. The following year it was produced by London Playhouse, starring Patricia Owens, along with William Hartnell, John Horsley, and David Markham.

In her review of a January 1958 episode of Wide Wide World entitled "A World on Wheels", Montreal Star TV critic Pat Pearce credits Liss for at least "managing to make an informative 90 minutes out of what was, in essence, one giant motor car commercial".

== Personal life and death ==
On April 17, 1936, in the nation's capitol, Liss married native New Yorker, fellow Brooklynite, and Hunter College alumnus (class of 1930), Mildred Melman, They had at least two children, daughters Josephine and Emily.

Liss died on May 20, 1988, aged 76.

== Filmography ==
- Studio One
  - Ep. "Not So Long Ago" (1948) - writer
  - Ep. "The Outward Room" (1949) - teleplay
  - Ep. "Moment of Truth" (1949) – teleplay
  - Ep. "The Dybbuk" (1949) – adaptation
  - Ep. "The Outward Room" (1949) – adaptation
  - Ep. "The Light That Failed" (1949) – adaptation
  - Ep. "The Inner Light" (1949) – adaptation
  - Ep. "The Scarlet Letter" (1950) – adaptation
  - "Torrents of Spring" (1950) – adaptation
  - Ep. "Trilby" (1950) – adaptation
  - Ep. "The Floor of Heaven" (1950) adaptation
  - Ep. "Hangman's House" (1951) – adapted by
  - Ep. "Mutiny on the Nicolette" (1951) – by
  - Ep. "Waterfront Boss" (1952) – adaptation
  - Ep. "Pagoda" (1952) – adaptation
- Philco Television Playhouse
  - Ep. "The Last Tycoon" (1949) – teleplay
  - Ep. "Mist on the Waters" (1949) – adaptation
  - Ep. "Little Boy Lost" (1950) – adaptation
  - Ep. "The Sudden Guest" (1950) – writer
  - Ep. "Ann Rutledge" (1950) – adaptation
  - Ep. "The Second Oldest Profession" (1950) – adaptation
  - Ep. "The Touch of a Stranger" – adaptation
  - Ep. "The Gambler" (1950) – writer
  - Ep. "The Great Escape" (1951) – adaptation
  - Ep. "Bulletin 120" (1951) - writer
  - Ep. "Tender Age" (1952) – writer
  - Ep. "The Best Laid Schemes" (1952) – writer
- The O'Neills
  - Ep. 1.1 (1949)
- Suspense
  - Ep. "Suspicion" (1949) – teleplay
  - Ep. "Man in the House" (1949) – adapted by
- Lux Video Theatre
  - Ep. "To Thine Own Self" (1950) – adaptation
- The Ford Theatre Hour
  - Ep. "The Heart of Darkness" (1950) – adapted by
  - Ep. "Cause for Suspicion" (1950) – adapted by
  - Ep. "The Golden Mouth" (1951) – adapted by
  - Ep. "The Heart of Darkness (restaged)" (1951) – adapted by
  - Ep. "Dead on the Vine" (1951) – adapted by
- The Black Forest (1954) – writer
- Goodyear Playhouse
  - Ep. "The Inward Eye" (1954) – writer
- American Inventory
  - Ep. "The Doodlebrain" (1955) – written by
- London Playhouse
  - Ep. "The Inward Eye" (1955) - writer
- Wide Wide World
  - Ep. "American Rhapsody" (1955) – writer
  - Ep. "Portrait of an American Winter" (1956) – writer
  - Ep. "Birth of an American" (1956) – writer
  - Ep. "Pursuit of Happiness" (1956) – writer
  - Ep. "Song of America" (1956) – writer
  - Ep. "The Florida Story" (1956) – writer
  - Ep. "A Woman's Story" (1957) – writer
  - Ep. "A Man's Story" (1957) – writer
  - Ep. "Land of Promise" (1957) – writer
  - Ep. "The Challenge of Space" (1957) – writer
  - Ep. "The World on Wheels" (1958) – writer
  - Ep. "Force for Survival" (1958) – writer
  - Ep. "The Sound of Laughter" (1958) – writer
- Matinee Theatre
  - Ep. "Silent Partner" (1956) - written by
- Encounter
  - Ep. "A Silent Cry" (1956) – writer
  - Ep. "The Silent Partner" (1957) – writer
  - Ep. "Hangman's House" (1959) – teleplay
- Sunday Showcase
  - Ep. "The Margaret Bourke White Story" (1960) – writer
- Play of the Week
  - Ep. "The Dybbuk" (1960) – writer
  - Ep. "He Who Gets Slapped" (1961) – adaptation
- Project Twenty
  - Ep. "The World of Billy Graham" (1961) – writer
  - Ep. "The World of Jimmy Doolittle" (1962) – writer
- The World of Sophia Loren (TV movie) (1962) – writer
- The World of Benny Goodman (TV movie) (1963) – writer
- The World of Maurice Chevalier (TV movie) (1963) – writer
- Espionage
  - Ep. "Some Other Kind of World" (1964) – writer
- For the People
  - Ep. "Between Candor and Shame" (1965) – story
- Bell Telephone Hour
  - Ep. "Wayfarer on the Mississippi" (1965) – writer
  - Ep. "The Many Facets of Cole Porter" (1965) – writer
  - Ep. "Salute to Veteran's Day" (1965) – writer
- In Search of Man (TV movie) (1965) – writer
