= Dana G. Peleg =

Israeli writer, translator, journalist and LGBTQI activist (born 1969)

Dana G. Peleg דנה ג. פלג
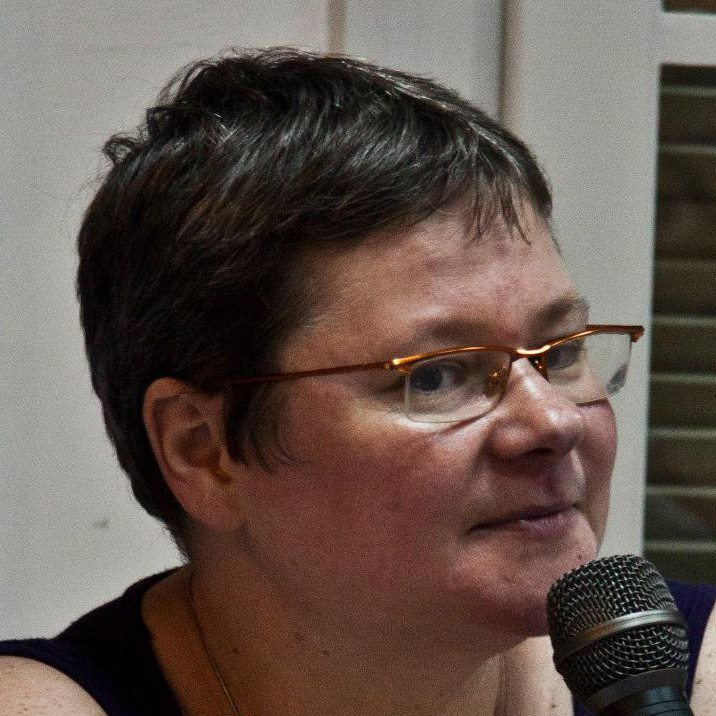
- Born: 1969 (age 56–57); Kiryat Bialik
- Occupations: Writer, translator, poet, journalist

Dana G. Peleg (Hebrew: דנה ג. פלג; born in 1969) is an Israeli writer, poet, journalist, translator and editor. She is an activist for women's and LGBT rights. She wrote the first regular column in the Israeli press on the subject of lesbian, bisexual and pansexual women, and her two short story collections and debut novel revolve around the same subject.

== Biography ==
Dana Faibish was born in 1969 in Kiryat Bialik, and then moved with her family to nearby Kiryat Haim, where she spent her childhood. When she was 18, she changed her surname to Peleg. Her mother Rina (nee Nadler) was a social worker, and her father, Eliezer, was a steam engine mechanic. They each immigrated from Romania, and met in Israel. Peleg is married to Miriam "Mimi" Hill, who took the name Peleg when the two were married in California in 2008. They have a son.

Peleg completed both a BA and an MA in art history at the Hebrew University of Jerusalem. While living in California between 2004 and 2009, she studied creative writing and screenwriting at Cabrillo College.

From 1996 to 2006, Peleg wrote a column for At (Hebrew: singular feminine "you") magazine, the first column in Israel about lesbians and bi/pansexual women.

Her first collection of short stories, T’eenim Ahuvati (Figs, My Love) first came out in 2000. Ishtati (Wiffee) her second short story collection came out in 2015. Peleg’s debut novel, Yad Anakot (Giantess’ Hand) was published in March 2024.

Peleg lives in the United States with her family.

== Career ==
=== Journalism ===
At the age of 16, Peleg began writing for teen magazine Hamtsan ("Oxygen"), and then for De'a Aheret ("Another View").

In 1996-2006, Peleg published a column about Lesbian and LBT women in At women’s magazine, which was the first of its kind in the Hebrew press. Being a personal column, it engaged with issues of gender, relationships between women, and butch and femme identities. Most of the characters in the column were fictional, except for Peleg herself, and her parents. After moving to Tel Aviv in 1997, Peleg wrote about coming out to her family, meeting Mimi, who was to become her life partner, and their subsequent relationship. She wrote about their move to the US, and the birth of their son. She stopped writing the column in 2006.

From 2003 to 2013, Peleg wrote for Haim Aherim ("A Different Life") magazine, and was briefly a member of the editorial board. She wrote for various LGBT publications, including Hazman Havarod ("Pink Times", 1997–2007), in which she wrote a literature and culture review column; Pandora (published by Klaf, 2002–2006); Hakeshet ("The Rainbow", 2003–2004); Ha'ir Bevarod ("The City in Pink", 2009–2010); and the online LGBT magazine, Go-Gay (2007–2011), for which she wrote a personal column on her life in Santa Cruz, California, and the struggle for same-sex marriage. Peleg had an LGBT literature review radio spot called "Proud to Present" on Radius Radio, and wrote regularly for other online venues, such as Ha'oketz and Erev Rav.

=== Literary writing ===
Peleg began writing short stories as a teenager, but returned to it as a serious vocation in 1995, after coming out. In 2000, she published a collection of her stories called Te'enim, Ahuvati ("Figs, My Love") at Shufra Publishing House. It was one of the first books in Hebrew to describe lesbian and bisexual women's lives, preceded only by Mazon Malkot ("Food of Queens") by Noga Eshed. Despite being fictional, the stories were based on Peleg's personal life experiences. The book was warmly received by the LGBT community and the literary community in general by critics such as Ilan Sheinfeld, Menachem Sheizaf and Vered Dor

Peleg's stories from 2000 onward continued to revolve around women, mostly lesbian and bi/pansexual ones. They are written from a more mature perspective and their topics are long-term relationships and parenthood. Most of these stories are collected in Ishtati, published in 2015 (digital edition) and 2020 (print edition).

Peleg has published her poetry in various magazines in Israel and the US and in the anthologies Ge’im LeHatzig Proud to Present (2003), edited by Ilan Sheinfeld, and At Kol Haratzon (You Are the Total Desire) edited by Orit Neumeir Potashnik.

=== Translation ===
Peleg is a literary and academic translator, from Hebrew to English and vice versa. The first novel she translated was The Dyke and the Dybbuk, by Ellen Galford. In 2000–2004 she was a full-time translator for several Israeli business and high-tech magazines, while translating novels for Kinneret and Babel publishing houses.

For the Ahoti movement, Peleg translated the report Who Profits from Racism and Sexism in Civil Society, and the catalog Breaking Silence about Mizrahi women artists. Every year, she translates the Index of Women's Security in Israel for the Haifa Women's Coalition.

Peleg translates plays: "Avshalom" by Noam Meiri, "Black Snow" and "Almost Blue" by Keith Reddin, "Cash on Delivery" by Michael Cooney, "Betty's Summer Vacation" by Christopher Durang.

=== The initial "G." in her name ===
Shortly after coming out in December 1994, Peleg began writing about LGBT topics under the pseudonym Dana Gal at Pi Ha'aton. When she started writing her column she continued using this pen name. Following the threat of a lawsuit against the magazine, she was asked to write under her real name. She was not ready to do so, and decided to keep the initial G. When her short story collection, Figs, My Love, came out in 2000, she added her last name, Peleg, but kept the G. for Gal, her previous pseudonym. In February 2000, Peleg wrote an essay for At magazine, entitled "Here I am/This is me" in which she explained that she was adopting the "G" as her middle initial as it better represented her contemporary identity.

Awards

Peleg received the Hans Christian Andersen Award (national) 2018 award for her translation of Anna and the Swallow Man by Gavriel Savit, published by Danny Sfarim in 2016 .

== Activism ==
Peleg is a queer socialist feminist.

In the 1980s, as a teenager, she was involved in the youth political movement Ratz – affiliated with the Meretz political party, with which she became involved as a university student. In 1994, she joined the Gay and Lesbian Student Group at the Hebrew University. She recalls that she felt out of place, as she was attracted to men as well as women (and had no concept yet of gender and sexual fluidity), and felt that only "pure lesbianism" was acceptable. She then became involved with the Bisexual and Lesbian Women group in Jerusalem. In 1996 she joined "Klaf" – the feminist lesbian collective, which was instrumental in establishing the first formal LGBT organizations in Jerusalem. Klaf published two magazines – Klaf Hazak and Pandora, and Peleg wrote a column for the latter.

In 2008, Peleg was living in Santa Cruz, California, and was an activist against the passage of Proposition 8, which called for a ban on same-sex marriage.

When she returned to Israel, Peleg became involved in the radical bisexual-pansexual organization Panorama, founded by Shiri Eisner and Lilach Ben David. She wrote for the fanzine published by the group, and was one of the organizers of the 2012 Festibi – the first bisexual convention to take place in Israel.

== Works ==
=== Books ===
- Te'enim Ahuvati (Figs, My Love) תאנים, אהובתי. 2000. תל אביב: שופרא לספרות יפה.
- Kdosha (Holy) קדושה, 2013, סיאל הוצאה לאור
- Ishtati (Wifee) אשתתי .2015, 2020. סיאל הוצאה לאור .
- Yad Anakot (Giantess’ Hand) יד ענקות, הוצאת קתרזיס, 2024

=== Poetry ===
- "Saint", Proud to Present. Shufra Publishing, Tel Aviv 2003 (in Hebrew)
- "And the Other Way Around", Zuta – Journal of Rhythmic Literature, vol. 67, July 2010 (in Hebrew)
- "Catcher of Bad Dreams", Zuta – Journal of Rhythmic Literature, vol. 81, October 2010 (in Hebrew)
- "*(Excerpt from a Novel)", Zuta – Journal of Rhythmic Literature, vol. 115, July 2011 (in Hebrew)
- "Literally", Tsmadim 2, April 2019, p. 4
- "A short Summary of my Citizenship Interview." Porter Gulch Review 2020, p. 28
- Home Hol בית חול, The Other Side of Hope: Journeys in Refugee and Immigrant Literature, Other Tongue Mother Tongue issue, April 2025, pp. 24–25

=== Select Translations ===
- The Dyke and the Dybbuk, Ellen Galford. Shufra Publishing, Tel Aviv 2004.
- Joining the Resistance, Carol Gilligan. Hakibbutz Hameuchad, 2016.
- Anna and the Swallow Man, Gavriel Savit. Danny Books, 2017.
- Arlo Finch in the Valley of Fire, John August, Danny Books, 2018
- Miriam Matzner Kenan. Midlife Momentum: Entering the Second Half of Life With Confidence and Optimism. Self published by the author, 2023
- Translation Tuesday: “Chemistry Lesson” by Hagit Zohara Mendrowski, Asymptote, May 24, 2022.
- Out of the Shadows by Lilach Galil, World Literature Today, February 25, 2025.

=== Editing ===
Peleg, Dana G., and Shalom Tsabar (Ed.). 1995. Lights and Shadows: The Lives of Jews in Russian and the Writings of Sarah Schor and Michael Axelrod. Jerusalem: Yad Vashem. (In Hebrew)
