= In Zaltsikn Yam =

1901 Yiddish poem by S. Ansky

"In the Salty Sea", (Note: Yiddish: אין זאַלטציקן ים, romanized: In Zaltsikn Yam, pronounced [ɪn ˈzaɫtsɪkn̩ jam]) (Note: Also known in Yiddish as In Zaltsikn Yam Fun Di Mentshleche Trern (אין זאַלטציקן ים פֿון די מענשליכע טרערן; lit. 'In the Salty Sea of Human Tears'), Tsum Bund: In Zaltsikn Yam Fun Di Mentshleche Trern (צום בונד: אין זאַלטציקן ים פֿון די מענשליכע טרערן; lit. 'To the Bund: In the Salty…') known simply as "To the Bund", (Note: Yiddish: צום בונד, romanized: Tsum Bund) is a Yiddish poem written by S. Ansky in 1901 and published in Der Arbeyter a year later. It became a popular Yiddish song when music was added to it. While it is unclear who composed the music to the song, the first published version was printed in 1919 by Jacob Glatstein in Warsaw, in the book Freiheits Lieder (Yiddish: פרײַהײַטס לידער, lit. 'Freedom's songs'). The poem and song is dedicated to the socialist General Jewish Labour Bund.

The text has often been considered controversial, with its direct critiques of wealthy Jews (especially in Russia), Zionists, and the belief in Messiah. Following The Holocaust, in 1945 the First, Second, Fifth, and Final stanzas were published in Mikhl Gelbart's yiddish song book Zingt mit mir and as such it has become convention to perform only these verses so as to omit criticism of other elements of the Jewish community. Daniel Kahn however has recorded and performs the full version; such as for the Yoyvls of the Australian Bund (one of the times with Psoy Korolenko; who translated the verses into Russian).

== Recordings ==
Due to the song's aforementioned controversial nature, recordings are difficult to track down (including with several published versions of the manuscript having no known recordings). However here are some of the few that exist:

- [Ethnographic recording], Lazar Vishniak singing in a Frankfurt POW camp, 1915 Recording (only first stanza, in timecode 12:40)
- [Ethnographic recording], Ruth Rubin, Performed in New York, 1948 Recording
- " Once upon a time" (Amol Iz Geven A Mayse), compiled and narrated by Joseph Mlotek arr. Vladimir Heifetz sung by Sidor Belarsky and Masha Benya, 1957 Recording
- "In Love And In Struggle: The Musical Legacy Of The Jewish Labor Bund", featuring Zalmen Mlotek, Adrienne Cooper, Dan Rous with The New Yiddish Chorale and The Workmen's Circle Chorus, 1999 Recording
- "The Upward Flight: The Musical World of S. An-sky", Michael Alpert and Stuart Brotman, 2006 Recording
- "The Unternational: The First Unternational", featuring Daniel Kahn, Psoy Korolenko, and Oy Division, 2008 [The song is sung in both Yiddish and English] Recording

== Lyrics ==
Yiddish original (Note: Written in its original 1901 spelling.)

אין זאַלציגען ים פון די מענשליכֿע טרעהרען
געפינס זיך אַ שרעקליכֿער תּהום
ער קאָן שוין נישט טיפער נישט פינסטערער װערען
איהם צײכֿענט אַ בּלוטיגער שטראָם

דעם תּהום האָבּען טױזענדער יאָהרען געגראָבּען
אמונה און שנאה און פּיין
און טױזענדער יאָהרען אלץ טראָפען נאָך טראָפען
עס גיסען זיך טרעהרען אריין

און פול איז דער תּהום דאָס איז יודישע טרעהרען
ער האָט נישט קיין טעות אין זיי
אַ בּלוטיגע טרעהר טהוט דעם קבּצן געהערען
דעם נגיד—אַ װײסע װי שנײ

נאָר אייך בּעלי-מלאכֿות, אביונים, קבּצים
געהערט דאָך דער בּלוטיגער תּהום
און אייערע „בּרידער“, די רײכֿע גזלנים
געהערט נאָר פון אױבּען דער שױם

שױן פול איז דער ים און פערפלײצט אַלע בּרעגען
װאו זענען די העלדען, די לייט
די, װעלכֿע װעלען זיך מוטהיג דערװעגען
צו װאַרפען אין תּהום זיך, אין שטרייט

דעם אַרבּײטער װער-זשע װעט ענדליך דערלײזען
פון הונגער און אײבּיגע לײד؟
און װער װעט דעם װעג אים צו פרײהײט בּעװײַזען
צו בּרידערשאַפט, גלײַכֿהײַט און פרײד؟

די גבירישע קינדער, משכּילים, רבּנים
זיי רופען אין ציון דעם יוד
אַ לידעל אַנ'אַלטע פון אונזערע שונאים
"!אַ געטאָ דעם אייבּיגען זשיד"

זיי רופען און זוכֿען, די קאַלטינקע מתים
פון הייליגע קברים אַ לאַנד
און דאָס, װאָס עס לײַדען און זיפצען הקדושים
צו דעם איז מען טויבּ װי די װאַנד

משיח און יודענטום - בּײדע געשטאָרבּען
אַנ'אַנדער משיח קומט אָן
דער יודישער אַרבּײטער גבירישער קרבּן
הױבּט אױף שױן פון פרייהייט די פאָן

דער העלד װעט די װעלט אי בּעפרייען, אי היילען
ער ט'גרייכֿען דעם תּהום בּיז'ן גרונד
זאָל לעבּען פון רוסלאַנד, פון ליטאָ און פוילען
דער יודישער אַרבּײטער-בּונד

Romanization of Yiddish

In zaltsikn yam fun di mentshlekhe trern
Gefint zikh a shreklekher thom,
Er ken shoyn nit tifer, nit fintsterer vern,
Im tseykhnt a blutiker shtrom.

Dem thom hobn toyznter yorn gegrobn
Emune un sine un payn,
Un toyznter yorn, alts tropn nokh tropn
Es gisn zikh trern arayn.

Un ful iz der thom dos iz yidishe trern
Er hot nisht keyn toes in zey
A blutiger trer tut deym kibbutzin geheren
Deym nagid - a vayse vi shney

Nor aykh bali-malokhes, ab'yonem, kibbutsim
Gehert dokh der blutiger thom
Un ayere "Brider", di raykhe gazlonim
Gehert nor fun oyben der shoym

Shoyn ful iz der yam un ferfleytst ale bregen
Vu zenen di helden, di leyt
Di, velkhe velen zikh mutig dervegen
Tsu varfen in thom zikh, in shtreyt

Dem arbeter ver-zhe vet endlekh derleyzn
Fun hunger un eybiker layd?
Un ver vet dem veg im tsu frayhayt bavayzn
Tsu bridershaft, glaykhkayt un freyd?

Di gvirishe kinder, mashkilim, rabonim
Zey rufen in Tsiyen dem yid
A lidel an' alte fun undzere sonim
"A geto deym eybigen Jid!"

Zey rufen un zukhen, di kaltinke meysim
Fun heylige kvorim a land
Un dos, vos es layder un ziftsen hakdoyshim
Tsu dem is men toyb vi di vand

Moshiakh un yidentum - bayde geshtorben
An'ander Moshiakh kumt on
Der Yidisher arbeyter gvirisher korben
Hoybt oyf shoyn fun frayhayt di fon

Der held vet di velt i bafrayen i heyln,
Er t'greykhn dem thom biz'n grund,
Zol leben fun Rusland, fun Lite un Poyln,
Der Yudisher Arbeyter-Bund.

Translation by Daniel Kahn

Beneath the salt sea of humanity's weeping
A terrible chasm abides
It couldn't be darker, it couldn't be deeper
It's stained with a bloody red tide

And thousands of years have created this chasm
Of piety, hatred, and pain,
And for thousands of years all humanity's weeping
Flows like a limitless rain.

So much of the sea has been filled with this sorrow
Endured by the suffering Jews
But only the tears of the poor ones are bloody
The rich cry as clear as the dew

Yes only the worker, the pauper, the beggar
Belong to the bloody abyss.
While those you call "brother", the rich and the greedy,
Fly high overhead in their bliss.

The ocean flows over and floods out the levees,
There isn't a hero in sight,
Yes where are the ones that will stand at the ready
To dive in the chasm and fight?

And who will at last free the worker from slavery,
Give hunger its final relief?
And who will be guiding the pathway to freedom,
To brotherhood, justice and peace?

The children of wealthy, enlightened, the clergy —
Into Zion they call the Hebrews,
We've heard this old story before from our enemies
"A ghetto for the Eternal Jew!"

They say that they answer the prayers of our fathers
From deep in their graves, hear them call
While souls who are living in sorrow and hunger
To them they're deaf as the wall.

Messiah and Jewry are both dead and buried,
Another messiah's to come:
The new Jewish worker the banner will carry
To signal that justice is done.

The world will be freed and be healed by this hero,
Who dives to the root of its wound!
In Russia, in Poland, in Vilna all hail now
The Great Jewish Worker's Bund!
