= Di Shvue =

1902 anthem of the General Jewish Labor Bund

"Di Shvue" (Yiddish: די שבֿועה, lit. 'The Oath'; also known as "Di Bundishe Shvue") was written by S. Ansky (pseudonym of Shloyme Zanvl Rappoport), in 1902. This Yiddish song became the anthem of the socialist General Jewish Labour Bund in the early 1900s. The source of its melody is unknown. Bundists sing this song virtually every time they meet. For example, it was sung at the 100th anniversary (1998) of the General Jewish Labour Bund in Paris, Marek Edelman's funeral, and the 50th anniversary (2009) reunion of Camp Hemshekh. The song exhorts Jews to unite, and to commit themselves body and soul to the defeat of the Russian Tsar and of capitalism.

== Lyrics ==
Text of "Di Shvue" printed for Marek Edelman's funeral

Yiddish lyrics
Latin transliteration
English translation
First verse

ברידער און שװעסטער פֿון אַרבעט און נױט
אַלע װאָס זײַנען צעזײט און צעשפּרייט
צוזאַמען, צוזאַמען, די פֿאָן איז גרייט
זי פֿלאַטערט פֿון צאָרן, פֿון בלוט איז זי רויט
אַ שבֿועה, אַ שבֿועה, אויף לעבן און טויט

Brider un shvester fun arbet un noyt
Ale vos zaynen tsezeyt un tseshpreyt,
Tsuzamen, tsuzamen, di fon iz greyt,
Zi flatert fun tsorn, fun blut iz zi royt!
A shvue, a shvue, af lebn un toyt.

Brothers and sisters in toil and poverty
All who are separated and dispersed
Together, together, the flag is ready
She waves in anger, she is red with blood!
An oath, an oath, of life and death!

Second verse

הימל און ערד װעלן אונדז אויסהערן
עדות װעט זײַן די ליכטיקע שטערן
אַ שבֿועה פֿון בלוט און אַ שבֿועה פֿון טרערן
מיר שװערן, מיר שװערן, מיר שװערן

Himl un erd veln undz oyshern
Eydes vet zayn di likhtike shtern
A shvue fun blut un a shvue fun trern,
Mir shvern, mir shvern, mir shvern!

Heaven and earth will hear us,
The light stars will bear witness.
An oath of blood and an oath of tears,
We swear, we swear, we swear!

Third verse

מיר שװערן אַ טרײַהײט אָן גרענעצן צום בונד
נאָר ער קען באַפֿרײַען די שקלאַפֿן אַצינד
די פֿאָן, די רויטע, איז הויך און ברייט
זי פֿלאַטערט פֿון צאָרן, פֿון בלוט איז זי רויט
אַ שבֿועה, אַ שבֿועה, אויף לעבן און טויט

Mir shvern a trayhayt on grenetsn tsum bund.
Nor er ken bafrayen di shklafn atsind.
Di fon, di royte, iz hoykh un breyt.
Zi flatert fun tsorn, fun blut iz zi royt!
A shvue, a shvue, af lebn un toyt.

We swear a loyalty without borders to the Bund.
Only it can free the slaves now.
The flag, the red flag, is high and wide.
She waves in anger, she is red with blood!
An oath, an oath, of life and death!

== See also ==
- S. Ansky
- General Jewish Labour Bund
- List of socialist songs
