= Don Richardson (director) =

American actor, director, acting teacher

- Born: April 30, 1918; New York City, New York, U.S.
- Died: January 17, 1996 (aged 77); Los Angeles, California, U.S.
- Occupations: Actor, director, teacher, author
- Years active: 1949–1973
- Children: 2

Don Richardson (April 30, 1918 – January 17, 1996) was an American actor, director, acting teacher, as well as an author.

== Career ==
Richardson was an original member of the Group Theatre, which was the nucleus of method acting in the United States. His fellow Group Theatre members included Lee Strasberg, Sanford Meisner, Stella Adler, and Uta Hagen, although Richardson was the only student who said, "The Method isn’t what acting is about."

Richardson directed three Broadway productions and over 800 television shows. On Broadway he directed Have I Got a Girl for You! (1963) and was assistant to Captain Kanin on The Rugged Path (1946). He began working in television in 1949. TV programs that he directed included Center Stage, Get Smart (TV series) (1965), One Day at a Time (TV series) (1975–1976), Lost in Space (TV series) (1966–1968), The Defenders (TV series) (1961–1963), and Bonanza (TV series) (1968–1971). His work remains in the permanent collection of The Museum of Broadcasting, The Jewish Museum of New York, and UCLA Film and Television Archive. Richardson taught acting at UCLA, Colombia's Barnard College and American Academy of Dramatic Arts in New York and California. He was awarded a professorship at Tel Aviv University in Israel. As an acting coach, he wrote and published the book Acting Without Agony: An Alternative to the Method, which is still used today by his successors. Richardson's students include Grace Kelly, Anne Bancroft, Zero Mostel, and John Cassavetes.

== Personal life ==
Richardson had a two-year relationship with his student, Grace Kelly, which began in the autumn of 1948, despite the disapproval of her parents. He was married and had two children.

== Death ==
Richardson died in Los Angeles on January 17, 1996, aged 77.

== Filmography ==
=== Directing credits ===
- The Oregon Trail (TV series) (1977)
- One Day at a Time (TV series) (1975–1976)
- Emergency! (TV series) (1974)
- Arnie (TV series) (1970–1972)
- Bonanza (TV series) (1968–1971)
- Lancer (TV series) (1968–1970)
- The High Chaparral (TV series) (1969–1970)
- Mission: Impossible (TV series) (1968)
- Lost in Space (TV series) (1966–1968)
- Custer (TV series) (1967)
- Vacation Playhouse (TV series) (1966)
- The Long, Hot Summer (TV series) (1965–66)
- The Munsters (TV series) (1965)
- The Virginian (TV series) (1964–65)
- Get Smart (TV series) (1965)
- Broadside (TV series) (1965)
- The Defenders (TV series) (1961–1963)
- The Doctors and the Nurses (TV series) (1962–1963)
- Sam Benedict (TV series) (1963)
- Margie (TV series) (1961–1962)
- The Chevy Mystery Show (TV series) (1960)
- Play of the Week (TV series) (1959–1960)
- Don Juan in Hell (TV movie) (1960)
- Lullaby (TV movie) (1960)
- The World of Sholom Aleichem (TV movie) (as Donald Richardson) (1959)
- The Elgin Hour (TV series) (1954–1955)<
- Mama (TV series) (1955)
- Armstrong Circle Theatre (TV series) (1954)
- The Motorola Television Hour (TV series) (1953–1954)
- Kraft Theatre (TV series) (1953)
- The Adventures of Ellery Queen (TV series) (1950–1952)
