= Leon Katz (playwright) =

American dramatist

Leon Katz (July 10, 1919 - January 23, 2017) was professor emeritus of drama at Yale University. He was a playwright, dramaturg, and scholar.

== Interviews with Alice B. Toklas ==
Katz was best known for his interviews with Alice B. Toklas, the companion of Gertrude Stein, which he conducted over the period from November 1952-February 1953. These interviews have served as the basis for much of the Stein scholarship over the years. In October 2007, Katz gave a public lecture and performance at Carnegie Mellon University based on his time spent with Toklas in her Paris apartment. Titled "An Evening With Leon Katz," the performance was staged using reproductions of artworks and some original pieces of furniture from Stein and Toklas's apartment.

== Playwriting ==
Besides his work with Toklas, Katz was also known for his playwriting. His work has been adapted and performed both in the United States and internationally. His plays include The Three Cuckolds, Sonya, Dracula: Sabbat, Son of Arlecchino, GBS in Love, Beds, Pinocchio, Finnegan's Wake, The Marquis de Sade’s Justine, Amerika, The Odyssey, Swellfoot’s Tears, Toy Show, Shekhina: The Bride, Remembrance of Things Past, and The Making of Americans (an opera based on Stein’s novel with music by composer Al Carmines).

== Teaching and dramaturgy ==
Katz had a long career as a dramaturg, professor, and scholar. In addition to Yale, where he was co-chairman of the School of Drama's Department of Dramaturgy and Dramatic Criticism, Katz taught at the University of North Carolina, Chapel Hill, UCLA, Cornell, Stanford, Columbia University, Vassar College, Carnegie Mellon, the University of Pittsburgh, the University of Giessen in Germany, and the Rhodopi International Theatre Laboratory in Bulgaria (of which he was a founding member, and which was renamed in his honor in 2008), among other institutions. Israeli theatre director Rina Yerushalmi was among Katz's master's students at Carnegie Mellon, and went on to direct two of his adaptations of The Dybbuk (Toy Show and Shekhina: The Bride) at La MaMa Experimental Theatre Club in the early 1970s.

Katz's 1984 essay, The Compleat Dramaturg, has become a standard text on dramaturgy. His final book, Cleaning Augean Stables: Examining Drama's Strategies, was published in 2012.

Katz was a contributing dramaturg to Tony Kushner's Pulitzer Prize-winning play, Angels in America.
