= Night of the Auk =

1956 Broadway drama by Arch Oboler

- Original ad for Washington preview run, 1956
- Original language: English
- Written by: Arch Oboler
- Characters: Doctor Bruner; Colonel Tom Russell; Lt. Mac Hartman; Lewis Rohnen; Lt. Jan Kephart
- Subject: Space travelers returning to Earth after the first Moon landing.
- Genre: Science fiction drama
- Setting: "A rocket ship returning from inter-stellar space", "The day after some tomorrow"

Premiere
- Date: November 12, 1956
- Place: Shubert Theatre; Washington, D.C.

Night of the Auk is a 1956 Broadway drama in three acts written by Arch Oboler. It is a science fiction drama in blank verse about space travelers returning to Earth after the first Moon landing. The play was based on Oboler's radio play Rocket from Manhattan, which aired as part of Arch Oboler's Plays in September 1945. Night of the Auk was published in book form in 1958.

== Summary ==
The action takes place aboard a spacecraft returning from the first crewed Moon landing, the crew of which witnesses nuclear war break out on Earth. In his foreword to the published edition of the play, Oboler expressed the hope that its vision of a potential future would prove to be "a playwright's fancy".

== History of the play ==
Night of the Auk was based on Oboler's radio play "Rocket from Manhattan", which aired as part of Arch Oboler's Plays on September 20, 1945, the month after the atomic bombings of Hiroshima and Nagasaki. (Note: Smokin' Rockets (p. 77) erroneously states that "Rocket from Manhattan" aired "Fourteen days after Hiroshima and 11 days after Nagasaki". The United States bombed Hiroshima on August 6, 1945, and Nagasaki on August 9, 1945.) "Rocket from Manhattan" featured only three characters: Dr. Chamberlain (Lou Merrill), Maj. Russell (Elliott Lewis) and Maj. Reynolds (Ervin Lee). The play's action was explicitly set on September 20, 2000 (exactly 55 years after the date of broadcast), rather than in the indefinite near future of Night of the Auk.

The published edition of Night of the Auk is dedicated "To NORMAN COUSINS who has tried to hold back the holocaust and to PETER who never had his chance". On April 7, 1958, Oboler's six-year-old son, Peter, drowned in rainwater collected in excavations for a bomb shelter at Oboler's Malibu, California, home, causing Oboler to regard him as a casualty of the atomic age.

== Productions ==
Produced by Kermit Bloomgarden and directed by Sidney Lumet, Night of the Auk's original production starred Martin Brooks (Lt. Jan Kephart), Wendell Corey (Colonel Tom Russell), Christopher Plummer (Lewis Rohnen), Claude Rains (Doctor Bruner) and Dick York (Lt. Mac Hartman). The play's world premiere took place at the Shubert Theatre in Washington, D.C., on November 12, 1956. Reviewing the play in The Washington Star, Jay Carmody wrote: "...if prizes were awarded for the most provocative play of the season, Mr. Oboler might already be busy making room on his mantel... a lively and imaginative theater piece."

Opening at the Playhouse in New York on December 3, 1956, the play ran there for only eight performances. Writing for the United Press, Jack Gaver wrote: "This is a coldly powerful, strangely moving drama of stature... It is a good season that can produce Eugene O'Neill's Long Day's Journey Into Night and Night of the Auk." Brooks Atkinson wrote in The New York Times: "Stirring up scientific jargon with portentous ideas, [Oboler] writes dialogue that is streaked with purple patches and sounds a good deal like gibberish." In the December 17, 1956 issue, Time reviewed:

Night of the Auk (by Arch Oboler) took place on a rocket ship returning to the earth from man's first landing on the moon (time: "The day after some tomorrow"). The mood of the return voyage is far from jubilant, what with a loathed egomaniac in command, a succession of murders and suicides, the discovery that full-scale atomic war has broken out on earth, and the knowledge that the rocket ship itself is almost surely doomed. Playwright Oboler seems indeed to be prophesying that the atomic age may end up with man as extinct as the great auk. Closing at week's end, the play mingled one or two thrills with an appalling number of frills, one or two philosophic truths with a succession of Polonius-like truisms, an occasional feeling for language with pretentious and barbarous misuse of it. A good cast of actors, including Claude Rains, Christopher Plummer and Wendell Corey, were unhappily squandered on a pudding of a script – part scientific jargon, part Mermaid Tavern verse, part Madison Avenue prose – that sounded like cosmic advertising copy.

According to his own later account, Oboler came to feel during the play's Washington run that the production was doomed due to its overly realistic presentation, which conflicted with the poetic tone of the dialogue. However, scholar Charles A. Carpenter would later write that the play's "failure as a theatrical as well as literary work... might more accurately be traced to its conflicting modes of parable and melodrama, the first compatible with Oboler's nonrealistic treatment, the second not." In his memoir, Christopher Plummer lamented Oboler's decision to write the play in blank verse, stating that Bloomgarden made suggestions for making the text less pretentious which Oboler ignored. Claude Rains regarded Night of the Auk as "a damned good play".

A television adaptation of Night of the Auk was broadcast on The Play of the Week on May 2, 1960, featuring William Shatner as Lewis Rohnen and James MacArthur as Lt. Hartman. This was the first time that Shatner played a spacecraft crew member on television. An Off-Broadway production at the Cricket Theatre opened on May 21, 1963, and lasted for three performances.

In August 2012, Outside Inside Productions presented the first New York revival of Night of the Auk at the 16th Annual New York International Fringe Festival. Authorized by the Oboler family, this new production, directed by Adam Levi with co-direction by Kaitlyn Samuel, was a 75-minute one-act version of the original play, adapted by playwright Michael Ross Albert (who also played Lewis Rohnen). The production featured women as Hartman and Bruner, but did not change the dialogue to make the characters female.

== See also ==
- Apollo 11, the actual 1969 first Moon landing
