= Rina Yerushalmi =

Rina Yerushalmi (Hebrew: רינה ירושלמי; born March 1, 1939) is an Israeli theater director and choreographer. Yerushalmi received an honorary doctorate from the Hebrew University of Jerusalem in 2001 and the Israel Prize in Theatre in 2008, among other awards and recognition.

== Biography ==
Yerushalmi was born March 1, 1939, in Afula, in northern Israel, and was raised in Haifa. Her mother, Haya (Angilovich) Yerushalmi, and father, Saul Yerushalmi (originally Yerusalimski), immigrated to Israel from Russia in 1920 and 1917, respectively. Her mother was a nurse, and her father was an engineer. Yerushalmi began studying dance at age six. At age 20, after her mandatory service in the Israeli Defense Force, Yerushalmi moved to London, where she studied Laban movement analysis with Kurt Jooss and stage management at the Royal Academy of Dramatic Art. Back in Israel, Yerushalmi studied the Lee Strasberg method with Nola Chilton and the Feldenkrais method with Moshe Feldenkrais. Yerushalmi moved to the United States in the late 1960s to pursue her MFA in theater directing at Carnegie Mellon University in Pittsburgh, Pennsylvania.

=== Early career (1970-1988) ===
Yerushalmi's final project at Carnegie Mellon, under the mentorship of Professor Leon Katz, was an adaptation of Buchner's Woyzeck. In 1970, after finishing her MFA, Yerushalmi moved to New York City and began working with Ellen Stewart's La MaMa Experimental Theatre Club in the East Village of Manhattan. She was a resident director at La MaMA from 1972 to 1978. Yerushalmi directed a number of productions at La MaMa throughout the 1970s and early 1980s, including: Toy Show (1970); Ta, Ta, Tatata (1970); Shekhina: The Bride (1971); Some Such Things (1978); Glasshouse (1980); and Yossele Golem (1982). She also choreographed and performed in An Ecumenical Theatrical Liturgy on the Rights of the Child (1979) and performed in Shradanjali (1982) at La MaMa.

During this time, she also founded a branch of La MaMa in Tel Aviv, which was active from 1972 to 1974.

=== Later career (1988-present) ===
In 1988, Yerushalmi directed a production of Hamlet at the Acco Festival of Alternative Israeli Theatre. Following this production, in 1989, Yerushalmi founded the Itim Theater Ensemble, for which she continues to serve as artistic director. The theater is dedicated to the performance of classical texts as contemporary theater.

Two of Yerushalmi's major productions with the Itim Theater Ensemble have been the Bible Project Parts I and II (1995-2000) and Mythos (2001/2002). The Bible Project consisted of Va-Yomer, Va-Yelech (And He Said, And He Walked) and Va-Yishtahu, Va-Yera (And They Bowed, And He Saw).

Yerushalmi currently teaches acting and directing at Tel Aviv University.

== Selected works ==
=== As director ===
- 1970: Woyzeck (MFA final project); Toy Show (Leon Katz's adaptation of The Dybbuk); Ta, Ta, Tatata (Yerushalmi's adaptation of The Trial and Malone Dies)
- 1971: Shekhina: The Bride (Leon Katz's adaptation of The Dybbuk)
- 1978: Malone Dies; Some Such Things
- 1980: Glasshouse (written by Fatima Dike)
- 1982: Yossele Golem (written by Dan Horowitz)
- 1986: Macbeth; Six Characters in Search of an Author
- 1988: Hamlet
- 1990: The Chairs; Hansel and Gretel (opera)
- 1991: Woyzeck 91
- 1992: Romeo and Juliet
- 1993: La Juive
- 1994: Hedda Gabler
- 1996: Va-Yomer,Va-Yelech (Bible Project, Part I)
- 1998: Va-Yishtahu, Va-Yera (Bible Project, Part II)
- 1999: Elektra
- 2002: Mythos (adaptation)

=== As choreographer ===
- 1979: An Ecumenical Theatrical Liturgy on the Rights of the Child

== Awards and recognition ==
- Margalit Prize, Best Director and Best Production (1990) for Hamlet
- Ha-Levi Award, Best Director (1992) for Woyzeck 91
- Israeli Academy of the Theater, Best Theatrical Creation (1999) for the Bible Project
- Milo Award (1999) for the Bible Project
- Honorary doctorate, Hebrew University of Jerusalem (2001)
- Michael Landau Prize for the Performing Arts (2005)
- Israel Prize, Theatre (2008)
