= London Playhouse =

British TV anthology series (1955–1956)

London Playhouse is a UK television anthology series that aired from 1955–1956. There were a total of twenty-five episodes. Among its writing credits include Tad Mosel, N. Richard Nash, Henry James, Robert Lowell, and Robert Alan Aurthur. Guest stars included Edward Mulhare, Sylvia Syms, Stephen Boyd, and Lionel Jeffries. Only seven of the episodes are known to still exist, nevertheless this is a higher survival rate than many other UK series of the mid-1950s.
