= Ellen Galford =

American-born Scottish writer

Ellen Galford is an American-born Scottish writer. She was born in the US and migrated to the United Kingdom in 1971, after a brief marriage in New York City. She came out in the mid-1970s. She has lived in Glasgow and London and now lives in Edinburgh with her partner. She is Jewish. Her works include four lesbian novels:

- Moll Cutpurse, Her True History (1984)
- The Fires of Bride (1986)
- Queendom Come (1990)
- The Dyke and the Dybbuk (1993)

Galford was involved in recording Edinburgh's LGBT community history for the Remember When project.

== Awards ==
- Winner of the 1994 Lambda Literary Award for Best Lesbian and Gay Humor
- Finalist for the 1995 American Library Association Gay, Lesbian, and Bisexual Award for Literature

== See also ==
- Lesbian fiction
