= Dybbuk =

Malicious possessing spirit in Jewish religion

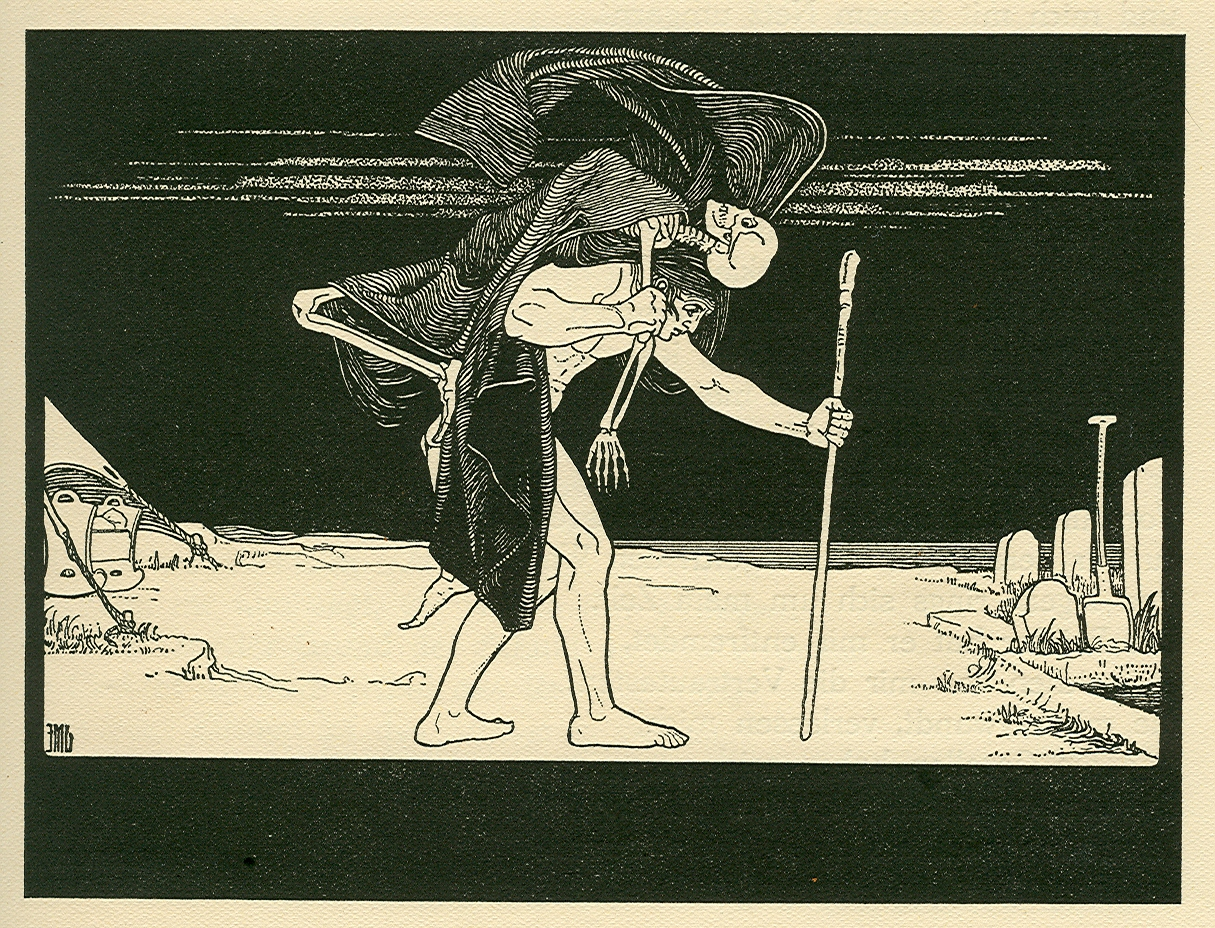
Dybbuk, by Ephraim Moshe Lilien (1874–1925).

In Jewish mythology, a dybbuk (/ˈdɪbək/; Yiddish: דיבוק, from the Hebrew verb דָּבַק dāḇaq, meaning 'adhere' or 'cling') is a malicious possessing spirit believed to be the dislocated soul of a dead person. It supposedly leaves the host body once it has accomplished its goal, sometimes after being exorcised.

== Etymology ==
Dybbuk comes from the Hebrew word דִּיבּוּק dibūq, meaning 'a case of attachment', which is a nominal form derived from the verb דָּבַק dāḇaq 'to adhere' or 'cling'.

== History ==
The term first appears in a number of 16th-century writings. However, it was ignored by mainstream scholarship until S. An-sky's 1920 play The Dybbuk popularised the concept in literary circles. Earlier accounts of possession, such as that given by Josephus, were of demonic possession rather than that of ghosts. These accounts advocated orthodoxy among the populace as a preventive measure. Michał Waszyński's 1937 film The Dybbuk, based on the Yiddish play by S. An-sky, is considered one of the classics of Yiddish filmmaking.

Rabbi Yoel Teitelbaum, the Satmar rebbe (1887–1979), is reported to have supposedly advised an individual said to be possessed to consult a psychiatrist.

Traditionally, dybbuks tended to be male spirits. According to Hayyim ben Joseph Vital, women could not become dybbuks because their souls did not participate in gilgul. Sometimes these spirits were said to possess women on the eve of their weddings, typically in a sexual fashion by entering the women through their vaginas, which is seen in An-sky's play. However, men and boys could be possessed as well.

In psychological literature, the dybbuk has been described as a hysterical syndrome.

== Reported cases and historical development ==
Although earlier Jewish sources contain accounts of demonic possession, the specifically Jewish idea of possession by the soul of a dead human being became prominent only in the early modern period. J. H. Chajes argues that Jewish possession narratives suddenly began to appear in the mid-sixteenth century, especially in Ottoman Galilee, after a long period in which no comparable Jewish narrative reports are known, even though earlier Jewish manuscripts preserved exorcistic techniques. The earliest cluster of cases is associated with Safed and its kabbalistic culture, where the spread of doctrines of gilgul and ibbur supplied a theological framework for understanding why a dead soul might enter a living body.

One of the early Safed traditions, summarized in Chajes's study, concerns a Jewish boy in the Galilean village of Safed in the early 1540s who was said to have been possessed by the soul of a sinner. In that account, the possessing soul had previously been lodged in a dog and sought vengeance after the boy's father killed the animal. Such stories show how dybbuk possession linked reincarnation, sin, animals, family relations, bodily suffering and rabbinic ritual authority.

Dybbuk accounts continued to be reported in later Jewish communities, especially in Hasidic and Eastern European settings. Bilu and Beit-Hallahmi analyzed 63 documented cases of dybbuk possession and argued that the Jewish variant of spirit possession could be interpreted through both psychodynamic and sociocultural factors. In their analysis, possession often served as a culturally intelligible way of expressing repressed conflict, forbidden desire, distress, family tension or resistance to social demands.

Modern public reports also exist, though they are contested. In April 1999, a widely publicized case in Dimona, Israel involved a 38-year-old widow who was reported to claim that the soul of her deceased husband had entered her body; Rabbi David Batzri diagnosed the case as dybbuk possession and performed an exorcism that was shown on Israeli television. Later reports connected Batzri with attempted exorcisms involving an American man treated remotely and a Brazilian man whose exorcism was attempted by Skype, while other rabbinic authorities rejected such cases as mental illness rather than possession.

== Mystical and kabbalistic interpretation ==
In kabbalistic sources, dybbuk possession is closely related to gilgul, the transmigration or reincarnation of souls. A dybbuk was usually understood as a sinful or dislocated soul that had failed to achieve rest after death and therefore entered a living person, often to seek rectification, confess guilt, complete an unresolved task or undergo expiation. The YIVO Encyclopedia states that the dybbuk had committed a sin that needed to be expiated before the soul could go either to heaven or Gehenna. Exorcism was therefore not only a healing ritual for the possessed person, but also a correction of the dead soul.

Dybbuk possession should also be distinguished from ibbur, another kabbalistic form of soul attachment. Whereas a dybbuk is generally harmful, coercive and involuntary, ibbur is usually understood as a positive attachment of an additional soul, often that of a righteous person, to assist the living person in performing a commandment or achieving spiritual repair. The contrast between dybbuk and ibbur shows that Jewish mystical traditions did not treat all cases of shared embodiment alike: a second soul could be interpreted as demonic, punitive and disruptive, or as reparative, temporary and spiritually beneficial.

The dybbuk therefore belongs to a broader kabbalistic anthropology in which the human person is not an isolated, self-contained individual, but a site through which souls, sins, ancestral histories and spiritual forces may pass. In this view, the body can become a place of judgment, confession and repair, while possession reveals hidden moral debts and unresolved relations between the living and the dead.

== Halakhic and ritual dimensions ==
The exorcism of a dybbuk raised halakhic and ritual questions because it involved speech directed toward a spirit, the use of divine names, adjurations, communal prayer and sometimes techniques that resembled magic. Chajes describes early modern Jewish exorcism as a form of religiously sanctioned magical healing, in which rabbis and kabbalists attempted to identify the possessing soul, compel it to confess, determine the sin or unresolved obligation that had caused its wandering, and then order it to leave the body. Such rituals could involve a rabbinic court, shofar-blowing, scriptural verses, divine names, bans, adjurations and public questioning of the possessing spirit.

The halakhic problem was not merely whether possession existed, but how a Jewish authority could respond to it without violating prohibitions against sorcery, divination or illicit use of divine names. Jewish legal sources generally distinguish forbidden magic from permitted healing, prayer and protective ritual; dybbuk exorcism existed in this contested boundary zone. For communities that accepted the reality of possession, the exorcist's task combined diagnosis, pastoral care, moral adjudication and spiritual intervention.

Modern rabbinic responses have varied. Some kabbalists and pietistic authorities continued to treat dybbuk possession as possible, while other rabbis urged psychiatric evaluation or rejected public exorcism. Rabbi Yoel Teitelbaum, the Satmar rebbe, is reported to have advised an individual said to be possessed to consult a psychiatrist, illustrating a modern rabbinic tendency in some circles to distinguish suspected possession from mental illness.

== Philosophical interpretation ==
The dybbuk raises philosophical questions about personal identity, embodiment, agency and moral responsibility. Possession imagines a single body as the site of two claims to agency: the living host and the dead soul that speaks or acts through the host. The possessed person may speak in another voice, disclose hidden information, confess sins, accuse others or resist social obligations, while the community must determine who is speaking and who is responsible for the action.

In this sense, the dybbuk is a Jewish form of divided agency. It is neither ordinary illness nor ordinary moral wrongdoing, because the speech and behavior of the possessed person are partly attributed to another agent. Yet it is also not simply external invasion, because the dybbuk acts through the host's body, voice and social position. The phenomenon therefore destabilizes simple distinctions between self and other, mind and body, life and death, illness and sin.

The title of S. An-sky's play, The Dybbuk, or Between Two Worlds, captures this liminality. The dybbuk stands between the world of the living and the dead, between mystical theology and folk practice, and between inner experience and public ritual. In modern literature and theatre, dybbuk possession has often become a metaphor for unresolved memory, historical trauma, forbidden love and the persistence of the past within the present.

== Panpsychic and idealist comparisons ==
Some modern comparative interpretations connect dybbuk traditions to broader philosophical views in which consciousness is not confined to the individual embodied subject. Panpsychism is the view that mind or mentality is a fundamental and widespread feature of reality, while idealist traditions give ontological priority to mind, experience or consciousness. Dybbuk traditions are not usually panpsychist in the strict philosophical sense, since they concern the survival and attachment of individual human souls rather than mentality inherent in all matter.

Nevertheless, kabbalistic dybbuk traditions assume a spiritually animated cosmos in which souls may migrate, attach, be elevated, descend, suffer, confess, and require repair. Hyman M. Schipper has argued more broadly that kabbalistic and Hasidic metaphysics can be read in panpsychist or panentheistic terms, because consciousness or proto-consciousness is treated as pervasive and hierarchically ordered within creation. Applied cautiously, such comparisons may illuminate the metaphysical background of dybbuk belief, but they should not be taken to mean that classical dybbuk sources themselves articulate modern panpsychism.

== Expulsion ==
In traditional Jewish communities, the concept of the dybbuk served as a socially acceptable way of expressing unacceptable urges, including sexual ones. Within Jewish mysticism and folklore, particularly in Kabbalistic traditions, protective practices were also used to ward off these malevolent spirits. One such practice involves affixing a mezuzah—a piece of parchment inscribed with specific Torah verses—to the doorposts of a home. While the mezuzah primarily serves as a reminder of faith and adherence to God's commandments, it is also viewed as a protective amulet against harmful spirits, including dybbuks. The Zohar, a foundational Kabbalistic text, suggests that a properly affixed mezuzah can prevent such entities from entering a home. Additionally, Jewish folklore includes accounts where neglected or improperly maintained mezuzot were believed to make homes susceptible to dybbuk possession. These perspectives emphasize the mezuzah's dual role in Jewish life: as both a symbol of faith and a spiritual safeguard.

== Dybbuk in popular culture ==
- Dybbuks are one of the various types of demons in Dungeons & Dragons.
- Hanna Rovina played a role of Leah in the 1920 play The Dybbuk.
- The novel Satan in Goray by Isaac Bashevis Singer, which portrays the appearance of a dybbuk in the fictional Jewish town of Goray, serves as an early literary version of the well-known motif in Jewish mythology.
- The Dyke and the Dybbuk (1993) by Ellen Galford, a satirical novel in which a lesbian in contemporary London is haunted by a dybbuk.
- The film A Serious Man (2009), directed by Joel and Ethan Coen, starts with a preamble about a dybbuk who visits a poor family living in a stetl. The dybbuk in the film may or may not be a rabbi who is either alive or dead. After being stabbed by the wife of the man who encountered the rabbi and invited him for a meal, the dybbuk walks out of their house and disappears into the snowy night. Whether he was or was not a dybbuk remains unanswered.
- The film The Possession (2012), directed by Ole Bornedal, is a supernatural horror film centered around the concept of a dybbuk. The story follows a young girl who becomes increasingly possessed by an evil spirit after discovering an antique dybbuk box at a yard sale.
- The Polish film Demon is typically interpreted as a story about dybbuk possession.
- The young adult novel The City Beautiful (2021) by Aden Polydoros features a gay teenager possessed by a dybbuk in 19th century Chicago.
- The novella To Clutch a Razor (2025) by Veronica Roth features a chapter in which a young woman found wandering in the woods is possessed by a dybbuk.
- The video game Mewgenics (2026) by Edmund McMillen features a boss fight against a feline Dybbuk that possesses one of the player's cats when its HP reaches one point and the other cats will have to knock their ally out to exorcise it.
- The novel Odessa (2026) by Gabrielle Sher features a Dybbuk that possesses a corpse that was not properly watched before burial.

== See also ==
- Dybbuk box
- Golem
- Ibbur
- Kabbalah
- Shedim
- Zombie
