= The Play of the Week =

American television anthology series

- Genre: Anthology Teleplay
- Written by: various
- Directed by: Stuart Burge; Marc Daniels; Sidney Lumet; Ralph Nelson; Don Richardson; Boris Sagal
- Theme music composer: John Green; Maurice Levin; David Martin
- Country of origin: United States
- Original language: English
- No. of seasons: 2
- No. of episodes: 67

Production
- Executive producers: Lewis Freedman; Worthington Miner; David Susskind
- Producers: Henry Weinstein; Jack Kuney
- Production location: New York City
- Cinematography: Mel London
- Production company: Talent Associates

Original release
- Network: Syndication (NTA Film Network)
- Release: October 12, 1959 – May 1, 1961

The Play of the Week is an American anthology series of televised stage plays which aired in NTA Film Network syndication from October 12, 1959, to May 1, 1961.

== Ambitious undertaking ==
The series presented 67 (35 in the first season, 32 in the second) videotaped Broadway-style productions, broadcast nightly and Sunday afternoons on NTA-owned independent station WNTA-TV (now WNET) in New York City, and syndicated to approximately 100 other NTA Film Network-affiliated stations. Because well-known performers were willing to accept minimum payments (top salary was $750) for the prestige of appearing in the critically praised showcase, production costs were kept to an average of $40,000. Although the budget was low, the show had a high distinction which, combined with its reputation as an innovative production, gave it momentum and propelled it into winning a Peabody Award.

== Episodes ==
=== Season 1 (1959–60) ===
First aired	#	Title	Author Adaptation	Producer	Director	Notes Cast
Oct; 12; 1959	1x01	Medea	Euripides translated by Robinson Jeffers	David Susskind	H. Wesley Kenney and José Quintero	[In order of appearance] Judith Anderson as Medea (1947–48 and 1949 Broadway cast), Henry Brandon as Jason (1949 Broadway cast), Aline MacMahon as Nurse, Jacqueline Brookes as Attendant to Medea, Eric Berry as Aegeus, Colleen Dewhurst as Second Woman of Corinth, Morris Carnovsky as Creon, Michael Wager as Jason's Slave, Mannie Sloane as Child, Rickey Sloane as Child, Don McHenry as Tutor (1947–48, 1949 and 1982 Broadway cast), Betty Miller as First Woman of Corinth; Introduction by episode producer David Susskind
Oct; 26; 1959	1x02	Burning Bright	John Steinbeck	Lewis Freedman and Henry Weinstein	Curt Conway	Staged by Guthrie McClintic and produced by Rodgers and Hammerstein, Burning Bright opened on Broadway at the Broadhurst Theatre on October 18, 1950 and closed on October 28, after 13 performances.: starring Myron McCormick [first of five appearances on The Play of the Week] as Joe Saul, with Colleen Dewhurst as Mordeen, Dana Elcar as Ed and Donald Madden as Victor, Songs by Will Holt Introduction by episode co-producer Lewis Freedman
Nov; 2; 1959	1x03	Back to Back: The Dock Brief and What Shall We Tell Caroline?	John Mortimer	David Susskind	Stuart Burge	Michael Hordern as Morgenhall and Tony Peters, George Rose as Fowle and Arthur Louden, Lueen McGrath as Bin, Jeane Marsh as Caroline
Nov; 9; 1959	1x04	A Month in the Country	Ivan Turgenev translated by Emlyn Williams	Lewis Freedman and Henry Weinstein	Marc Daniels	Uta Hagen as Natalia Petrovna, Luther Adler as Ignaty Illyich Shpichelsky, Alexander Scourby as Rakitin, Richard Easton as Beliaev, Tim O'Connor as Yslaev, Olga Bellin as Vera
Nov; 16; 1959	1x05	The Waltz of the Toreadors	Jean Anouilh translated by Lucienne Hill	David Susskind	Stuart Burge	Hugh Griffith as Général St. Pé, Mildred Natwick as Mme. St. Pé, Beatrice Straight as Mlle. de St. Euverte, John Abbott as Dr. Bonfant, Mary Grace Canfield as Sidonia, Jenny Egan as Estelle, Louise Kirtland as Mme. Dupont-Fredaine, James Valentine as Gaston
Nov; 19; 1959	1x06	The Power and the Glory	Graham Greene adapted by Pierre Bost and Denis Cannan	David Susskind	Carmen Capalbo	James Donald as Priest, Peter Falk as Mestizo, Ronald Long as Tench, Val Avery as Police Chief, Scotty McGregor as Maria, David J. Stewart as Governor's Cousin, John Alderson as Miguel, Alfred Ryder, Rudy Bond
Nov; 23; 1959	1x07	The White Steed	Paul Vincent Carroll	David Susskind	Joseph Gistirak	Frank Conroy as Canon Matt Lavelle, Tim O'Connor as Father Shaughnessy, Helena Carroll as Nora Fintry, Dermot McNamara as Denis Dillon, Roy Poole as Patrick Hearty, Pauline Flanagan as Sarah Hearty, Lester Rawlins as Toomey, Neil Fitzgerald as Fintry, Tom Clancy as Shivers
Nov; 30; 1959	1x08	Crime of Passion	Jean-Paul Sartre translated by Lionel Abel	David Susskind	Stuart Burge	Claude Dauphin as Hoederer, Donald Harron as Hugo, Betsy von Furstenberg as Jessica, Marian Seldes as Olga, Horace McMahon as Georges
Dec; 7; 1959	1x09	Simply Heavenly	Langston Hughes music by David Martin	David Susskind	Joshua Shelley	Melvin Stewart as Jesse P. Simple, Claudia McNeil as Mamie, Gail Fisher as Joyce Lane, Ethel Ayler as Zarita, Frederick O'Neal as Boyd, Earle Hyman as Hopkins
Dec; 14; 1959	1x10	The World of Sholom Aleichem	Arnold Perl Music by Serge Hovey and Robert de Cormier	Producer for NTA; Lewis Freedman Produced by Henry T. Weinstein	Don Richardson	1. "A Tale of Chelm"; 2. "Bontche Schweig — Based on a story by I. L. Peretz; 3. "The High School" — Based on a story by Sholom Aleichem; Starring Gertrude Berg, Sam Levene, Zero Mostel, Morris Carnovsky, Lee Grant and Nancy Walker as Rifkele, with Jack Gilford and in order of appearance Charlotte Rae, Elsa Freed, Henry Lascoe, Conrad Josephs, Frederick Rolf, Dora Weissman
Dec; 21; 1959	1x11	Thieves' Carnival	Jean Anouilh translated by Lucienne Hill	Lewis Freedman	Warren Enters and Richard Dunlap	[in alphabetical order] Larry Blyden as Hector, Tom Bosley as Dupont-Dufour Jr., Howard Da Silva as Dupont-Dufour Sr., Kurt Kasznar as Peterbono, Robert Morse as Gustave, Cathleen Nesbitt as Lady Hurf, Pat Stanley as Juliette, Frances Sternhagen as Eva
Dec; 28; 1959	1x12	The Cherry Orchard	Anton Chekhov	David Susskind	Daniel Petrie	Helen Hayes as Madame Ranevskaya, E. G. Marshall as Lopakhin, Susan Strasberg as Anya, Salome Jens as Dunyasha, John Abbott as Gayev, Peggy McCay as Vary, Gerald Hiken as Trofimoff, Martin Wolfson as Semyonoff-Pishtchik, Paula Laurence as Carlotta Ivanova, Woodrow Parfrey as Epihodoff, Byron Russell as Fiers, Julian Battersby as Gardener
Jan; 4; 1960	1x13	The Closing Door	Alexander Knox	David Susskind	Alexander Knox and Karl Genus	Staged by Lee Strasberg and produced by Cheryl Crawford, The Closing Door opened on Broadway at the Empire Theatre on December 1, 1949 and closed on December 17, after 22 performances. The playwright, Alexander Knox, had the leading role of Vail Trahern, and his wife, Doris Nolan, played Vail Trahern's wife, Norma.: Dane Clark as Vail Trahern, Kim Hunter as Norma Trahern, Arthur Hill as Dr. Ed Harriman, Kevin Coughlin as David Trahern, Katherine Squire as Grandma, George Segal as Don, John Randolph as Hector Trahern, Elizabeth Eustis as Connie
Jan; 11; 1960	1x14	The Emperor's Clothes	George Tabori	Lewis Freedman	Boris Sagal	Viveca Lindfors as Belia Odry, Jules Munshin as Kossa, George Voskovec as Elek Odry, Sandor Szabo as the Baron, Charles Saari as Ferike, Tamara Daykarhanova, Peter Falk, Margit Fossgrin, David Hurst, Reuben Singer
Jan; 18; 1960	1x15	Lullaby	Don Appell	David Susskind	Don Richardson	Eli Wallach as Johnny Horton, Anne Jackson as Eadie Horton, Ruth White as Mother, Tom Carlin as the Bellboy
Jan; 25; 1960	1x16	Strindberg on Love: Miss Julie and The Stronger	August Strindberg translated by Arvid Paulsen adapted by George Tabori	David Susskind	Henry Kaplan	Lois Smith as Julie, Robert Loggia as Gene, Patricia Neal as the Mistress, Nancy Wickwire as the Wife, Madeleine Sherwood as Kristin
Feb; 2; 1960	1x17	Juno and the Paycock	Seán O'Casey	David Susskind	Paul Shyre	Pauline Flanagan as Juno Boyle, Hume Cronyn as Captain Jack Boyle, Walter Matthau as Joxer Daly, Evans Evans as Mary Boyle, Luella Gear as Maisie Madigan, Liam Clancy as Johnny Boyle, Thomas A. Carlin as Jerry Devine, James Kenny as Charlie Bentham
Feb; 8; 1960	1x18	Tiger at the Gates	Jean Giraudoux translated by Christopher Fry	Robert L. Joseph and Henry Weinstein	Paul Almond and Harold Clurman	Directed by Harold Clurman and produced by Robert L. Joseph, Tiger at the Gates, the English-language title translator-playwright Christopher Fry chose for Jean Giraudoux's 1935 play La guerre de Troie n'aura pas lieu [The Trojan War Will Not Take Place] opened on Broadway at the Plymouth Theatre on October 3, 1955, transferred to the Helen Hayes Theatre on November 21, and closed on April 7, 1956, after 217 performances.: Donald Davis as Hector, Martin Gabel as Ulysses, Patricia Cutts as Helen, Nina Foch as Andromache, Arthur Treacher as Lawyer Busiris, Patrick Horgan as Paris, Leueen McGrath as Cassandra (Broadway cast [billed as Leueen MacGrath]), Cathleen Nesbitt as Hecuba, Mike Kellin as Ajax, Bramwell Fletcher as King Priam, David Hurst as Poet Propagandist, Milton Selzer as Mathematician (Broadway cast), Bill Howe
Feb; 15; 1960	1x19	Don Juan in Hell	George Bernard Shaw	David Susskind	Don Richardson	[in alphabetical order] Marc Connelly as The Stage Manager, Hurd Hatfield as Don Juan, Dennis King as The Statue of the Commander, Siobhán McKenna as Dona Ana, George C. Scott as The Devil
Feb; 22; 1960	1x20	A Very Special Baby	Robert Alan Aurthur	David Susskind	Marc Daniels	Oscar Homolka as Mr. Casale, Marion Winters as Anna Casale, Larry Blyden as Joey Casale
Feb; 29; 1960	1x21	The Climate of Eden	Moss Hart adapted from Edgar Mittelholzer's 1951 novel	David Susskind	Moss Hart	Staged by Moss Hart, who adapted it from Edgar Mittelholzer's British Guiana-set novel, Shadows Move Among Them, The Climate of Eden opened on Broadway at the Martin Beck Theatre on November 13, 1952 and closed on November 22, after 20 performances.: [in order of appearance] Donald Harron as Mr. Buckingham, Roland Culver as The Reverend Gerald Harmston, Diana Hyland as Mabel, Chuck Gordone as Logan, Lynn Loring as Olivia, Kevin Coughlin as Berton
Mar; 7; 1960	1x22	Volpone	Ben Jonson	Jack Kuney	J. Robert Blum and Gene Frankel	[in alphabetical order] Ludwig Donath as Corbaccio, Alfred Drake as Mosca, Evans Evans as Colomba, Lou Jacobi as Corvino, Kurt Kasznar as Volpone, Art Smith as Voltore, Michael Tolan as Leone, Jo Van Fleet as Canina
Mar; 14; 1960	1x23	The Rope Dancers	Morton Wishengrad	David Susskind	Peter Hall	Directed by Peter Hall, The Rope Dancers opened on Broadway at the Cort Theatre on November 20, 1957, transferred to Henry Miller's Theatre on January 27, 1958 and closed on May 3, after 189 performances. At the 12th Tony Awards on April 13, 1958, The Rope Dancers was one of eight nominees for Best Play and Siobhán McKenna was among six nominees for Best Actress in a Play.: Siobhán McKenna as Margaret Hyland (Broadway cast), Walter Matthau as James Hyland, Audrey Christie as Mrs. Farrow, Jacob Ben-Ami as Dr. Jacobson, Frances Myers as Clementine, Judy Sanford as Lizzie Hyland, Joseph Boland as Police Officer (Broadway cast)
Mar; 21; 1960	1x24	Henrick Ibsen's; The Master Builder	Henrik Ibsen Translated by Eva Le Gallienne	Executive Producer; David Susskind Produced by Lewis Freedman	John Stix and Richard A. Lukin	In London, two months after the December 1892 Norwegian publication of The Master Builder, the play received its first English-language production, with a translation by William Archer. The January 1900 American premiere in New York City was not at a Broadway theater, but in Carnegie Hall's Lyceum.: Starring E. G. Marshall as Solness, Lois Smith as Hilde, Phyllis Love as Kaja, Fred Stewart as Dr. Herdal, Victor Kilian as Knut Brovik, James Patterson as Ragnar Brovik and Joanna Roos as Aline Solness
Mar; 28; 1960	1x25	The Grass Harp	Truman Capote	Jack Kuney	Word Baker	Directed by Robert Lewis, The Grass Harp opened on Broadway at the Martin Beck Theatre on March 27, 1952 and closed on April 26, after 36 performances.: Lillian Gish as Dolly Talbo, Carmen Mathews as Verena Talbo, Georgia Burke as Catherine Creek (Broadway cast), Russell Collins as Morris Ritz (Broadway cast [as Judge Charlie Cool]), Jonathan Harris as Amos Legrand (Broadway cast [as Dr. Morris Ritz]), Nick Hyams as Collin Talbo
Apr; 4; 1960	1x26	A Palm Tree in a Rose Garden	Meade Roberts	David Susskind	Keve Hjelm and Wes Kenney	Directed by Warren Enters, A Palm Tree in a Rose Garden opened Off-Broadway at the Cricket Theatre on November 26, 1957 and closed on January 19, 1958.: Glenda Farrell as Rose Frobisher, Barbara Ann Barrie as Lila Frobisher, Barbara Baxley as Barbara Parris (Off-Broadway cast), Robert Webber as Charlie Gordon
Apr; 11; 1960	1x27	The Enchanted	Jean Giraudoux translated by Maurice Valency	David Susskind	Keve Hjelm and Wes Kenney	Staged by George S. Kaufman, The Enchanted, playwright-critic Maurice Valency's English-language title for his 1950 translation of Jean Giraudoux's 1933 play Intermezzo, opened on Broadway at the Lyceum Theatre on January 18, 1950, and closed on February 25, after 45 performances.: [in alphabetical order] Walter Abel as Inspector, Joseph Buloff as Executioner, Cyril Cusack as Doctor, Mary Finney as Leonide Mangebois, Rosemary Harris as Isabel, James Mitchell as Ghost, Frances Lorrain Myers as Gilberte, Tom Poston as Supervisor, Frederick Rolf as Executioner, Joan Terrace as Lucy, Arthur Treacher as The Mayor, Nydia Westman as Armande Mangebois
Apr; 18; 1960	1x28	The Girls in 509	Howard Teichmann	David Susskind	Keve Hjelm and Wes Kenney	Staged by Bretaigne Windust, The Girls in 509 opened on Broadway at the Belasco Theatre on October 15, 1958 and closed on January 24, 1959, after 117 performances.: [in alphabetical order] Larry Blyden as Pusey, Parker Fennelly as Old Jim, Paul Ford as Winthrop Allen a/k/a Francis X. Nella, Margalo Gillmore as Aunt Hattie, John McGiver as Aubrey McKittridge, Nancy Walker as Mimsy
Apr; 25; 1960	1x29	Morning's at Seven	Paul Osborn	David Susskind	Jack Ragotzy	[in alphabetical order] Beulah Bondi as Mother, Russell Collins as Carl (1939–40 Broadway cast), Frank Conroy as David Crampton, Dorothy Gish as Aaronetta (1939–40 Broadway cast), Ann Harding as Cora, Eileen Heckart as Myrtle, Chester Morris as Swanson, Hiram Sherman as Homer Bolton, Ruth White as Ida; Intermission interview hosted by Russel Crouse
May; 2; 1960	1x30	Night of the Auk	Arch Oboler	Lewis Freedman	Nikos Psacharopoulos	Based on Arch Oboler's radio play Rocket from Manhattan, Night of the Auk, directed by Sidney Lumet, opened on Broadway at the Playhouse Theatre on December 3, 1956 and closed on December 8, 1959, after 8 performances. The cast, in alphabetical order, was: Martin Brooks as Lieutenant Jan Kephart, Wendell Corey as Colonel Tom Russell, Christopher Plummer as Lewis Rohnen, Claude Rains as Dr. Bruner, Dick York as Lieutenant Max Hartman. Three years after the TV production, another staging, at Off-Broadway's Cricket Theatre, lasted 3 performances, May 21–23, 1963.: [in alphabetical order] Warner Anderson as Colonel Tom Russell, William Kerwin as John Custer, James MacArthur as Lieutenant Max Hartman, Alan Mixon as Lieutenant Jan Kephart, William Shatner as Lewis Rohnen, Shepperd Strudwick as Dr. Bruner, Luis Van Rooten as The President; Narrated by Raymond Edward Johnson
May; 9; 1960	1x31	A Piece of Blue Sky	Frank Corsaro	David Susskind	Keve Hjelm and Wes Kenney	Originally titled The Squirrel Cage, A Piece of Blue Sky, with its star, Shelley Winters, was produced by Jay Julian and directed by the author, Frank Corsaro, as a touring play which went into rehearsals on December 15, 1958 and, following three and a half weeks of performances in regional theatre, was scheduled to open in New York City at the end of January 1959. The production folded, however, upon completion of its brief tour.: Shelley Winters as Kay, Gerald O'Loughlin as Al, Nancy Marchand as Margaret, Marian Seldes as Antonette, Morgan Sterne as Joe, Sudie Bond as Miserable
May; 16; 1960	1x32	Archy and Mehitabel	Mel Brooks and Joe Darion adapted from Don Marquis' book The Life and Times of Archy and Mehitabel music by George Kleinsinger	Jack Kuney Producer for NTA; Worthington Miner	J. Robert Blum and Ed Greenberg	Titled Shinbone Alley and supervised by Sawyer Falk (original director Norman Lloyd requested the removal of his name from the credits), Archy and Mehitabel opened on Broadway at the Broadway Theatre on April 13, 1957 and closed on May 25, after 49 performances.: Eddie Bracken as Archy (Broadway cast), Tammy Grimes as Mehitabel, Jules Munshin as Tyrone T. Tattersall, Sondra Lee as Rusty, Michael Kermoyan as Big Bill, Joan Kruger, George Martin, John Smolko
May; 23; 1960	1x33	Mary Stuart	Friedrich Schiller translated by Jean Stock Goldstone and John Reich	David Susskind	Dennis Vance	Directed by Tyrone Guthrie, Mary Stuart opened off-Broadway at the Phoenix Theatre on October 8, 1957 and closed on November 24, after 56 performances.: Eva Le Gallienne as Queen Elizabeth (Broadway cast), Signe Hasso as Mary Stuart, John Colicos as Mortimer (Broadway cast), Staats Cotsworth as Burleigh, Patrick Waddington as Leicester, Paul Ballantyne as Shrewsbury, Muriel Kirkland as Hanna Kennedy, Philip Bourneuf as Paulet, David C. Jones as L'Aubespine
May; 30; 1960	1x34	The Grand Tour	Elmer Rice	David Susskind	William A. Graham	Staged by the playwright, Elmer Rice, The Grand Tour opened on Broadway at the Martin Beck Theatre on December 10, 1951 and closed on December 15, after 8 performances.: Scott McKay as Ray Brinton, Audrey Meadows as Nell Valentine
Jun; 7; 1960	1x35	The House of Bernarda Alba	Federico García Lorca translated by James Graham-Lujan and Richard L. O'Connell	David Susskind	Keve Hjelm and Wes Kenney	Directed by Boris Tumarin and Robert Breen, The House of Bernarda Alba opened on Broadway at the ANTA Playhouse on January 7, 1951 and closed on January 20, after 17 performances.: Anne Revere as Bernarda Alba, Lee Grant as Amelia, Cathleen Nesbitt as Martirio, Nancy Marchand as Margareta, Suzanne Pleshette as Adela, Eileen Heckart as Poncia Thomas Gomez and Michael Tolan read selections from García Lorca's poetry after the play's conclusion

=== Season 2 (1960–61) ===
- Henry IV, Part 1 by William Shakespeare; in the cast: Donald Davis as Henry IV, Stephen Joyce as Prince Hal, Donald Madden as Hotspur, Eric Berry as Falstaff, John Frid as The Earl of Worcester, and Nan Martin as Lady Percy (September 26, 1960)
- The Dybbuk adapted by Joseph Liss; directed by Sidney Lumet; in the cast: Ludwig Donath, Carol Lawrence, Michael Tolan, Theodore Bikel and Vincent Gardenia (October 3, 1960)
- Legend of Lovers by Jean Anouilh; adapted by Kitty Black; directed by Ralph Nelson; cast: Piper Laurie, Robert Loggia, Sam Jaffe, Michael Constantine and Polly Rowles (October 10, 1960)
- The Velvet Glove by Rosemary Casey; in the cast: Helen Hayes, Robert Morse, Arthur Shields, Larry Gates and Collin Wilcox (October 17, 1960)
- Duet for Two Hands by Mary Hayley Bell; cast: Signe Hasso, Eric Portman, Patrick Horgan and Lois Nettleton (October 24, 1960)
- Seven Times Monday by Ernest Pendrell; directed by Wes Kenney; in the cast: Ossie Davis, Ruby Dee, Rosetta LeNoire, William Windom and Warren Berlinger (October 31, 1960)
- Two by Saroyan—"Once Around the Block" and "My Heart's in the Highlands" by William Saroyan; in the cast: Walter Matthau, Orson Bean, Myron McCormick, Larry Hagman and Eddie Hodges (November 7, 1960)
- The Iceman Cometh by Eugene O'Neill; directed by Sidney Lumet; introduced by Brooks Atkinson; in the cast: Jason Robards as Hickey, Farrell Pelly as Harry Hope, Robert Redford as Don Parritt, Myron McCormick as Larry Slade and Julie Bovasso as Pearl (Part I—November 14, 1960)
- The Iceman Cometh (Part II—November 21, 1960)
- Highlights of New Faces by Leonard Sillman; in the cast: Robert Clary, Alice Ghostley, Ronny Graham, Paul Lynde and Inga Swenson (November 28, 1960)
- Uncle Harry by Thomas Job; in the cast: Ray Walston, Betty Field, Jeff Donnell, Sylvia Miles and John Zacherle (December 5, 1960)
- Rashomon – December 12, 1960; directed by Sidney Lumet
- Emmanuel – December 19, 1960
- A Clearing in the Woods – January 2, 1961
- The Potting Shed – January 9, 1961
- Black Monday – January 16, 1961
- New York Scrapbook – January 23, 1961
- He Who Gets Slapped – January 20, 1961
- Four by Tennessee – February 6, 1961
- The Sound of Murder – February 13, 1961
- Night of the Auk – February 20, 1961
- No Exit and The Indifferent Lover – February 27, 1961
- The Old Foolishness – March 6, 1961
- Thérèse Raquin – March 13, 1961
- The Wooden Dish – March 20, 1961
- A Cool Wind Over the Living – March 27, 1961
- Waiting for Godot by Samuel Beckett; in the cast: Zero Mostel as Estragon and Burgess Meredith as Vladimir (April 3, 1961)
- In a Garden – April 10, 1961
- The Wingless Victory – April 17, 1961
- Close Quarters – April 24, 1961
- All Summer Long – May 1, 1961
