= Myropil, Zhytomyr Oblast =

Rural settlement in Zhytomyr Oblast, Ukraine

Myropil
- Rural settlement
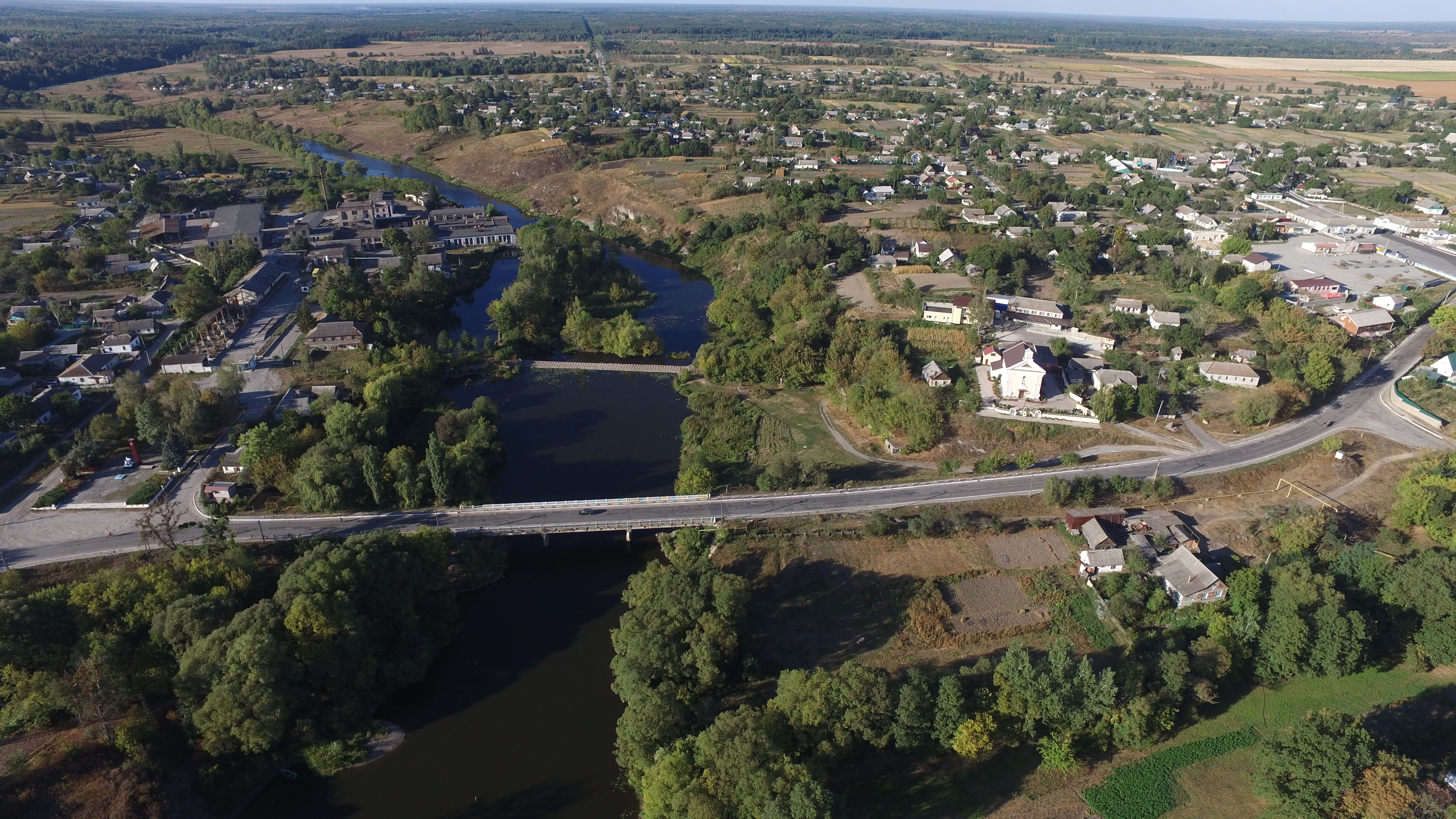
- Sluch River in Myropil

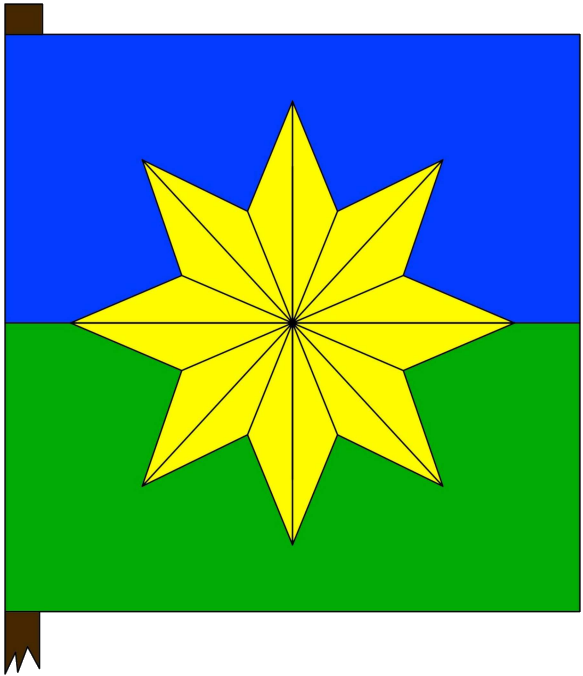
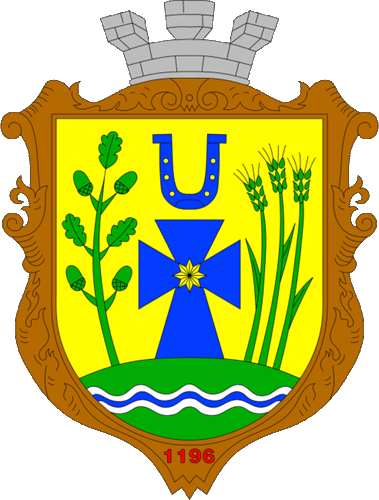
- Flag Coat of arms

- Location within Zhytomyr Oblast Location within Ukraine
- Country: Ukraine
- Oblast: Zhytomyr Oblast
- District: Zhytomyr Raion
- First mention: 1497

Area
  - Total: 9 km^{2} (3.5 sq mi)

Population (2022)
  - Total: 4,469
  - Density: 500/km^{2} (1,300/sq mi)
- Time zone: UTC+2 (EET)
  - Summer (DST): UTC+3 (EEST)
- Postal code: 13033-13036

Myropil (Ukrainian: Миропіль, translit. Myropil’, Russian: Миро́поль, Polish: Miropol) is a rural settlement in Zhytomyr Raion, Zhytomyr Oblast, Ukraine. Population: 4,469 (2022 estimate)

== History ==
Until 26 January 2024, Myropil was designated urban-type settlement. On this day, a new law entered into force which abolished this status, and Myropil became a rural settlement.
