= S. An-sky =

Belarusian Jewish author, playwright, scholar, and activist

- ש. אַנ-סקי
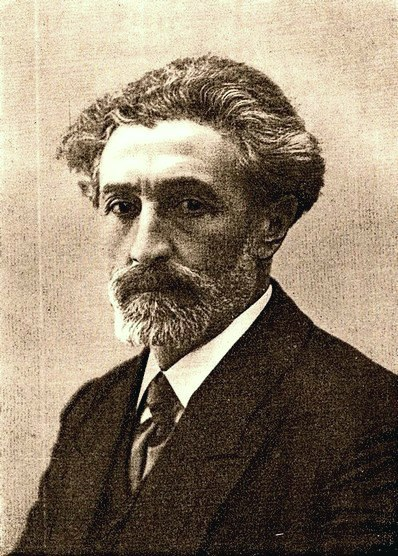
- Born: Shloyme Zanvl Rappoport; October 27, 1863; Chashniki, Lepelsky Uyezd, Vitebsk Governorate, Russian Empire
- Died: November 8, 1920 (aged 57); Warsaw or Otwock, Poland
- Occupations: Writer, journalist, ethnographer
- Writing career
- Pen name: S. An-sky
- Language: Yiddish, Russian

Shloyme Zanvl Rappoport (Russian: Шлиом Аро́нович Рапопо́рт; October 27, 1863 – November 8, 1920), also known by his pen name S. An-sky, (Note: also An-ski, Ansky, Anski) was a Jewish author, playwright, researcher of Jewish folklore, polemicist, and cultural and political activist. He is best known for his play The Dybbuk or Between Two Worlds, written in 1914, and for Di Shvue, the anthem of the Jewish socialist Bund. In 1912-1914, he led the Jewish Ethnographic Expedition to the Pale of Settlement.

In 1917, after the Russian Revolution, he was elected to the Russian Constituent Assembly as a Social-Revolutionary deputy.

== Biography ==
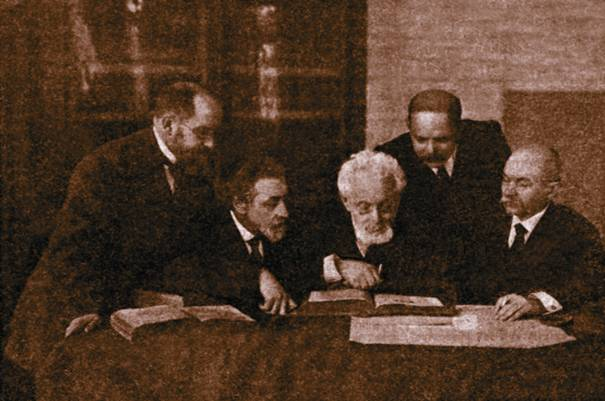
Odessa writers. From left to right: Y. Ravnitzki, An-sky, Mendele Mocher Sforim, H. N. Bialik, S. Frug. Published in Simon Dubnow's newspaper in 1916

Shloyme Zanvl Rappoport was born to Aharon and Khana Rappoport in Chashniki, Vitebsk Governorate, Russian Empire (now Belarus), but spent his childhood in Vitebsk. He was from a poor religious family, and he had only a heder education. His mother ran a tavern; his father worked as a courier for Polyakov's Moscow Land Bank, and was often absent. His father eventually deserted the family, after which his mother moved them to Vitebsk. He left his home and moved to Liozno in his late-teens, and worked as a tutor; he was ostracised by his community for "disseminating radical ideas". He wrote his first novel, "History of a Family", in Yiddish, it was translated and published in Russian in 1884.

Rappoport was actively involved in revolutionary movements, initially as a populist (known as narodniki) and later as a member of the Socialist Revolutionary (SR) Party. At this time, he changed his name from Jewish to Russian, Semyon Akimovich. In the 1880s, in the spirit of the Going to the People movement, popular among populists, he moved to Ekaterinoslav region, where he worked as a tutor and in the "salt- and coal-mining industry". He believed in the importance of the education of Russia's peasants and participated in activities such as collecting workers' songs and giving public readings, which led to his arrest in 1888. In 1892, he was introduced to the literary circles of St. Petersburg, where he started writing under the pen name S. An-sky. He moved to Paris in 1892 and lived in Europe until 1905. He mainly wrote in Russian, but eventually started to write in Yiddish too. He also worked as a secretary for Russian philosopher Petr Lavrov in Paris. He had a short marriage to a "French-Russian woman". After Lavrov's death, An-sky moved to Switzerland, where, together with Viktor Chernov, he founded a populist Agrarian Socialist League. In 1904-1905, he was an editor of the Yiddish socialist journal Kampf un kempfer (The Fight and the Fighters).

An-sky returned to Russia in 1905, after the revolution. He debated prominent figures like Simon Dubnow, Chaim Zhitlowsky, and Shmuel Niger on various issues, including Jewish revolutionary dedication, Christian imagery in Jewish literature, and the trilingual vision of modern Jewish literature. An-sky also became active in Jewish publishing, editing and contributing to several Jewish journals and encyclopedias. From 1908 to 1918, he traveled extensively, lecturing on Jewish cultural topics while remaining involved in Socialist Revolutionary politics. He published works on anarchism and revolutionary plays, and was arrested in 1907 "for disseminating revolutionary propaganda". He had another failed marriage in 1908, to Esther Glezerman.

In 1912-1914, An-sky with a small team went for an ethnographic expedition to the Pale of Settlement, collecting thousands of photographs, folk tales, songs, and artefacts. Based on the collected materials, An-sky wrote his most famous work, the play The Dybbuk. It was soon translated to Yiddish, and is now regarded as one of the most famous plays of the Yiddish theatre.

During the World War I and until the October Revolution of 1917, An-sky worked for the Jewish Committee for the Relief of War Victims; in 1920 he published his memoir of these times, Khurbn Galitsye (The Destruction of Galicia). After the revolution, he escaped to Vilna and then to Warsaw, where he died of a heart attack on November 8, 1920.

== Ethnographic work ==
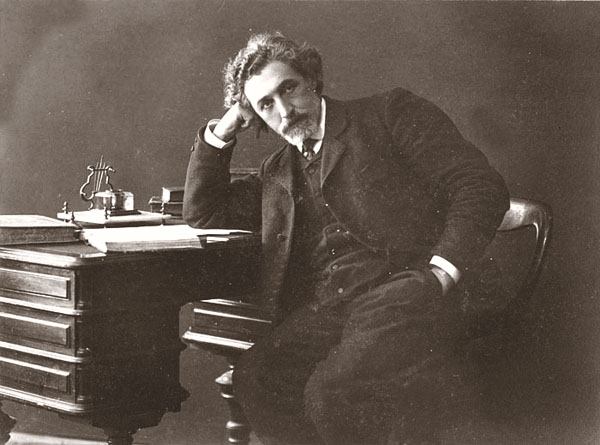
S. An-sky, 1910

Under the influence of the Russian narodniki movement, An-sky became interested in ethnography, as well as socialism, and became a political activist. Between 1912 and 1913, An-sky headed the Jewish Ethnographic Expedition, financed by Baron Vladimir Günzburg and named in honor of his father Horace Günzburg, which traveled through Podolia and Volhynia in the Pale of Settlement. They documented the oral traditions and customs of the native Jews, whose culture was slowly disintegrating under the pressure of modernity. According to his assistant Samuel Schreier-Shrira, An-sky was particularly impressed by the stories he heard in Miropol of a local sage, the hasidic rebbe Samuel of Kaminka-Miropol (1778 – May 10, 1843), who was reputed to have been a master exorcist of dybbuk spirits. Samuel served as the prototype for the character Azriel, who is also said to reside in that town. Historian Nathaniel Deutsch suggested he also drew inspiration for The Dybbuk from the Maiden of Ludmir, who was also rumored to have been possessed, thus explaining her perceived inappropriate manly behavior. He composed a detailed ethnographic questionnaire of 2,087 questions.

An-sky's ethnographic collections were locked away in Soviet vaults for years, but some material has come to light since the 1990s. The State Ethnographic Museum at St. Petersburg holds a good deal of it. Some of his vast collection of cylinder recordings made on these expeditions were digitized by the Vernadsky National Library of Ukraine, which holds the collection. Deutsch compares the An-sky's expedition materials to genizah, particularly to the Cairo genizah.

An-sky built trust during the expedition by joining local men for prayer in synagogues and study houses before interviewing them and recording wedding songs, lullabies and Hasidic nigunim on phonograph cylinders. He described this folk culture as another “oral Torah” created by ordinary Jews.

His ethnographic report of the deliberate destruction of Jewish communities by the Russian army in the First World War, Khurbn Galitsiye (The Destruction of Galicia), has become a major source in the historiography of the war's impact on civilian populations.

== Literary career ==
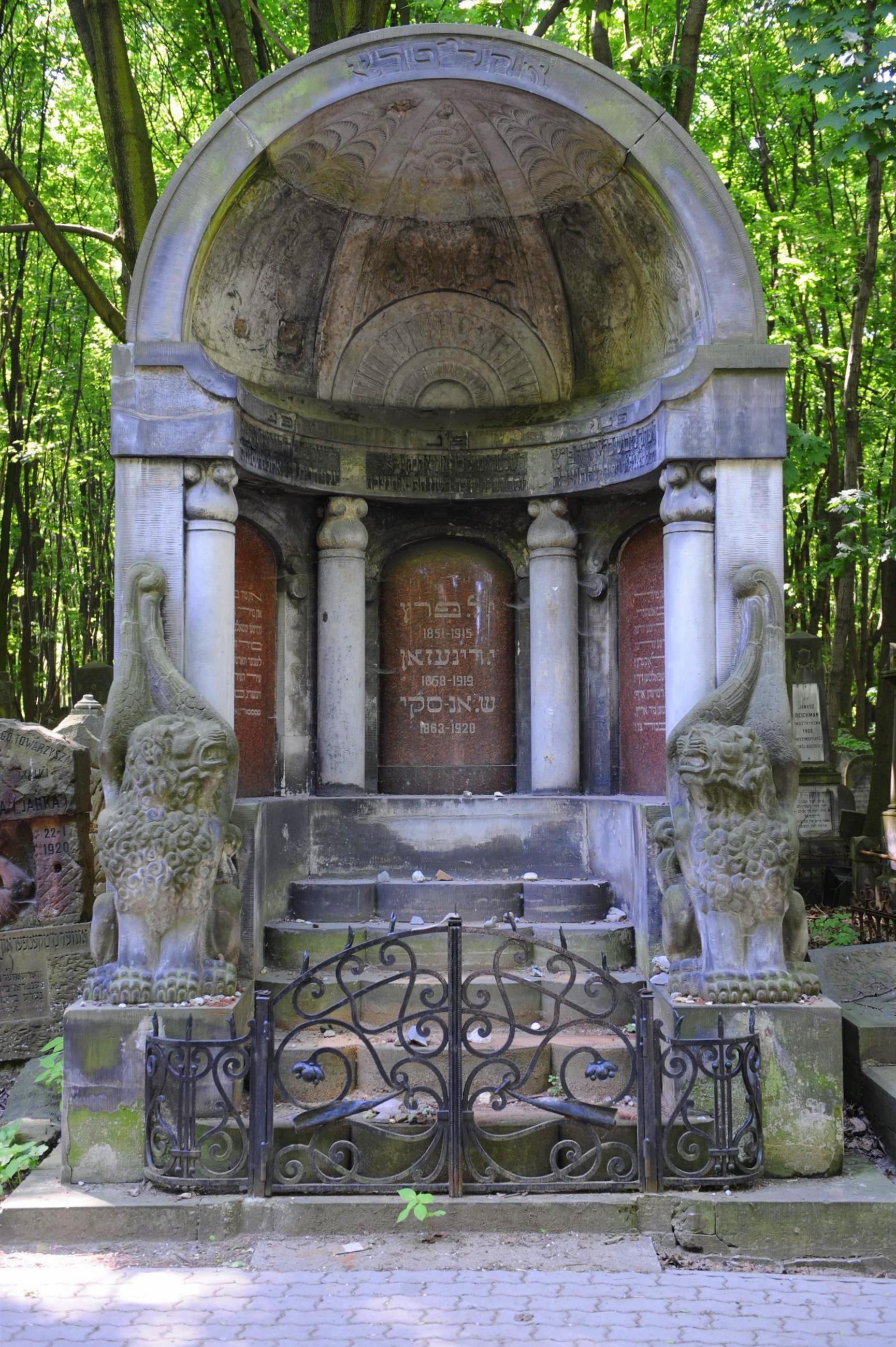
Mausoleum of the Three Writers (Peretz, Dinezon, and An-sky) in Warsaw

Initially he wrote in Russian, but from 1904 he became known mainly as a Yiddish author.

He is best known for his play The Dybbuk or Between Two Worlds, written in 1914. The play was first staged in the Elyseum Theatre in Warsaw, on December 9, 1920, one month (at the end of the 30-day mourning period) after the author's death. It was subsequently translated into a dozen or more languages and performed thousands of times all over the world. It is still being produced, along with numerous adaptations, as well as operas, ballets, and symphonic suites. (For example, in 2011 there were seven different productions.) It is considered the jewel of the Jewish theatre. In the early years The Dybbuk was considered so significant that parodies of it were written and produced.

Although The Dybbuk is An-sky’s best-known work, he published many works of literature, politics and ethnography. His Collected Works, which do not include all his writings, comprise fifteen volumes. An-sky wrote a number of other plays, four of which are included in this collection, long out of print. One (Day and Night) is, like The Dybbuk, a Hasidic Gothic story. The other three plays have revolutionary themes, and were originally written in Russian: Father and Son, In a Conspiratorial Apartment, and The Grandfather. All four have recently been republished in a bilingual Yiddish-English edition.

An-sky was also the author of the song Di Shvue (The Oath), which became the anthem of the Jewish Socialist Bund party. He was the author of the poem (later made into a song) "In Zaltsikn Yam" (In the Salty Sea), which was also dedicated to the Bund.

== Selected publications ==
- Sketches on Folk Literacy, 1892/1894
- Hungry, 1892
- Mendel the Turk, 1892
- Pioneers, 1904–1905
- On a New Course, 1907
- Jewish Folk Art, 1908
- The Folk and the Book, 1913
- The Dybbuk, 1914
- The Destruction of Galicia, 1920
- Album of the Jewish Artistic Heritage (published posthumously)

== Sources ==
- Ansky, S. (2003). Neugroschel, Joachim (ed.). The Enemy at His Pleasure: A Journey Through the Jewish Pale of Settlement During World War I. Macmillan. ISBN 978-0-8050-5945-8.
- Avrutin, Eugene M., ed. (2009). Photographing the Jewish Nation: Pictures from S. An-sky's Ethnographic Expeditions. Brandeis University Press. ISBN 978-1-61168-683-8.
- Caplan, Debra; Moss, Rachel Merrill (2023). The Dybbuk Century: The Jewish Play That Possessed the World. University of Michigan Press. doi:10.3998/mpub.11522250. ISBN 978-0-472-07643-7. JSTOR 10.3998/mpub.11522250.
- Deutsch, Nathaniel (2003). The maiden of Ludmir: a Jewish holy woman and her world. Berkeley: University of California Press. ISBN 9780520231917.
- Deutsch, Nathaniel (2011). The Jewish dark continent: life and death in the Russian pale of settlement. Cambridge, Mass: Harvard University Press. ISBN 978-0674047280.
- Mlotek, Eleanor G. S. Ansky : (Shloyme-Zanvl Rappoport) 1863-1920 : His Life and Works : Catalog of an Exhibition. [New York]: YIVO Institute for Jewish Research, 1980. OCLC 10304171
- Neugroschel, Joachim, ed. (2000). The Dybbuk and the Yiddish Imagination: A Haunted Reader. Syracuse University Press. ISBN 9780815628712.
- Rechtman, Abraham (2021). The lost world of Russia's Jews: ethnography and folklore in the pale of settlement. Bloomington, Indiana: Indiana University Press. ISBN 9780253056948.
- Safran, Gabriella; Zipperstein, Steven J., eds. (2006). The Worlds of S. An-sky: A Russian Jewish Intellectual at the Turn of the Century. Stanford University Press. doi:10.1515/9781503620247. ISBN 978-0-8047-4527-7.
- Safran, Gabriella (2010). Wandering Soul: The Dybbuk's Creator, S. An-sky. Harvard University Press. doi:10.2307/j.ctvjghv5w. ISBN 978-0-674-05570-4. JSTOR j.ctvjghv5w.
