= Boretz =

Boretz is a European surname. Notable people with the surname include:

- Allen Boretz
- Alvin Boretz
- Benjamin Boretz
- Naomi Boretz
