= Copacabana (1947 film) =

1947 film by Alfred E. Green

- Directed by: Alfred E. Green
- Written by: Allen Boretz; Howard Harris; László Vadnay (story and screenplay)
- Produced by: Sam Coslow
- Starring: Carmen Miranda; Groucho Marx; Steve Cochran
- Cinematography: Bert Glennon
- Edited by: Philip Cahn
- Music by: Edward Ward
- Production company: Beacon Productions
- Distributed by: United Artists
- Release dates: May 30, 1947 (United States); July 11, 1947 (New York City)
- Running time: 92 minutes
- Country: United States
- Language: English
- Budget: $1,300,000
- Box office: $1,250,000

Copacabana is a 1947 American musical comedy film directed by Alfred E. Green starring Groucho Marx, Carmen Miranda, and Steve Cochran. Groucho appears for the first time in his own person, without his traditional greasepaint mustache and swallow-tail coat. (He does don the old makeup and costume for one last time, in a specialty number.) This was Groucho's first significant film appearance as a solo act, minus his brothers Harpo and Chico.

== Plot ==
Lionel Q. Devereaux and his alluring girlfriend, Brazilian singer Carmen Navarro, have been engaged for 10 years. They are highly unsuccessful vaudeville performers, due to Lionel's total lack of talent. They have worn out their welcome at a theatrical hotel in New York City, and the manager gives them 24 hours to pay their bill. Lionel splits the act: Carmen will be the talent and Lionel will be her agent. He goes to the famous Copacabana nightclub, forcing himself on producer Steve Hunt and pressuring him to audition Carmen.

When the producer asks Lionel about his other clients, Lionel produces a list—a racing form—where one of the names on the sheet is Mlle. Fifi. Lionel persuades Carmen to audition as Parisian belle Mlle. Fifi, with her face covered by a veil. The producer hires both Carmen and Fifi for the Copa. Carmen now has to do quick costume changes on a breakneck schedule to maintain the illusion of two different women. Steve is very attracted to the girls, and to protect Carmen from the producer, Lionel tells him that he is engaged to be married to Carmen. Steve then turns to Fifi and asks her out instead. Anne Stuart, Steve's secretary, is in love with the producer herself, and resents his going on a date with Fifi.

Lionel's professional rival, an agent named Liggett, persuades Lionel to sell Fifi's contract to him for $5,000. Lionel accepts the fast cash, reasoning that Liggett is paying for someone who doesn't exist. Lionel is unaware that Hollywood producer Anatole Murphy wants to star Fifi in movies, and will pay $100,000 to Liggett.

Liggett becomes suspicious when he sees the veiled Fifi get into a taxi, and then Carmen comes out of it. Anne reveals to Carmen that the mysterious Fifi has made her getting Steve's attention impossible. To help Anne out, Lionel and Carmen stage a fight between Carmen and Fifi in Carmen's dressing room. The fight ends with Fifi disappearing. Lionel reports back to Steve that Fifi has been found dead in the river, but he also expresses his satisfaction over "killing" her. The conversation is overheard, and he is blamed and arrested for Fifi's murder. Lionel tries to explain to the police during the investigation that he only made Fifi up, but nobody believes him and he makes repeated attempts to escape the law.

Steve confesses that he only expressed an interest in Fifi because of his business, and that he is really in love with Anne. Carmen enters the scene, dressed as Fifi, but removes her veil in front of everybody, showing that Carmen and Fifi are one and the same. The film producer, Murphy, enthused by this incredible story, buys the entire premise for a film. Lionel becomes involved in the ensuing film production, and takes screen credit for almost everything, from casting to developing the film. The picture opens with a song about the Copacabana.

== Cast ==
- Groucho Marx as Lionel Q. Devereaux
- Carmen Miranda as Carmen Navarro / Mademoiselle Fifi
- Steve Cochran as Steve Hunt
- Andy Russell as Himself
- Gloria Jean as Anne Stuart
- Ralph Sanford as Liggett
- Andrew Tombes as Anatole Murphy
- Frank J. Scannell as Joe Lane, stage manager
- Chester Clute as Hotel desk clerk
- Dick Elliott as Green, hotel manager
- The DeCastro Sisters as Themselves, in finale
- Chili Williams as Copa Girl
- Mari Blanchard as Copa Girl

Guest appearances by Broadway columnists:

- Abel Green as Himself
- Louie Sobol as Himself
- Earl Wilson as Himself

== Production ==
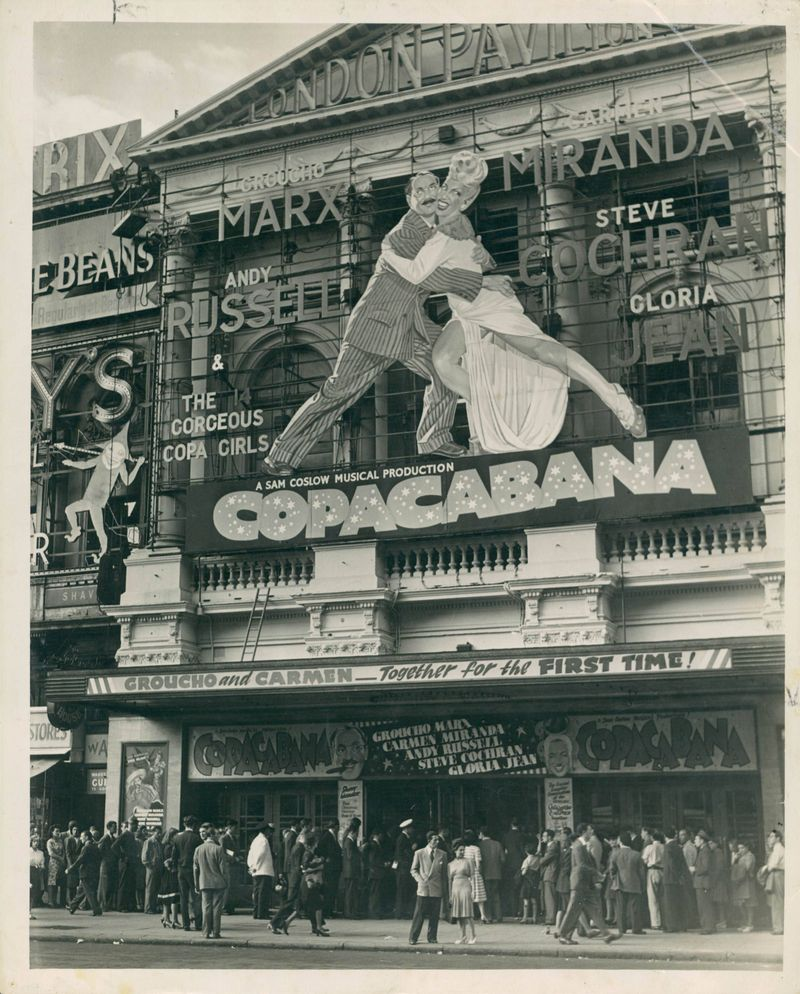
Advertisement for the movie Copacabana on the facade of the London Pavilion

According to a report in the Hollywood Reporter (June 1944), independent producer Jack H. Skirball was originally set to make the film, with assistance from Monte Proser. Around the same time, George Raft was announced as a potential lead for the film.

The film's origins trace back to when United Artists suggested to Sam Coslow that the studio could use a musical film to balance its release schedule. Coslow discussed the idea with George Frank, Carmen Miranda's manager, and Monte Proser and Walter Bachelor, managers of the famous New York City nightclub Copacabana, located at 10 East 60th Street. They decided to combine Miranda with the Copacabana. This was Miranda’s first film after leaving 20th Century-Fox, the studio with which she had been under contract since 1940. Coslow wrote a story that included a dual role for Miranda. They made an agreement with David Hersh to back the production, and United Artists approved it.

In August, Coslow cast singing star Gloria Jean for her first film since December 1944. On the advice of her agent Eddie Sherman, she had left motion pictures for national and then international personal appearance tours, and returned to Hollywood in 1946. In September 1946, it was announced that Groucho Marx would star, without his older brothers. He agreed to 10% of the profits.

Coslow, Frank, Proser, Bachelor, and Hersh invested preproduction funds, including scriptwriter fees and secretarial expenses. They borrowed 65% of the $1,300,000 budget from a bank at 5% interest. The remaining 35% came from Standard Capital, a private financing company. United Artists announced that Coslow would be producing five musical features, "all to carry budgets of $1,500,000 or more." Proser's terms were 20% of the profits plus $25,000 for the screen rights to the Copacabana name.

The film includes cameo appearances by Broadway columnists Abel Green (editor of Variety), Louie Sobol (New York Journal-American), and Earl Wilson (New York Post). At the time of production, Groucho Marx was married to Kay Gorcey; she has a small role as a cigarette girl, from whom Groucho tries to buy a nickel cigar.

The Hollywood Reporter announced that character comedians Chester Clute, Dick Elliott, Frank Scannell, and Andrew Tombes were added to the cast. Pierre Andre was also hired to perform a special dance number with Dee Turnell.

Filming began on November 1, 1946, at Samuel Goldwyn Studios, and the shoot lasted for 42 days, on a par with major motion pictures of the day. One of the screenwriters was Allen Boretz, who had co-written the hit play Room Service, later adapted as a Marx Brothers film. Boretz reused the Room Service premise of an unsuccessful theatrical entrepreneur using desperate means to land a lucrative contract. Another of the Copacabana writers was Howard Harris, who caught the spirit and pace of Groucho's wisecracks so well that he went on to write material for Groucho's You Bet Your Life television series.

Seven original songs were composed by Sam Coslow. Groucho Marx insisted on a song by his usual tunesmiths, Bert Kalmar and Harry Ruby, and sang their "Go West, Young Man", composed in 1936.

In mid-February 1947, The Hollywood Reporter announced that Sam Coslow was considering reshooting scenes in which Miranda appeared with blonde hair, due to letters from Brazilian fans stating they preferred her as a brunette. The reshot scenes would be inserted only in prints released in South America, according to the item. Given that production expenses were already well over the million-dollar mark and the film was nearing release, it is unlikely that Coslow bothered to film additional scenes.

Coslow decided that the rough cut of the film ran too long, and film editor Philip Cahn trimmed it to 92 minutes. One of the deleted sequences was a specialty number by the DeCastro Sisters, a rubber-faced nightclub trio who combined songs and dances with laughs, in the manner of the Ritz Brothers. In the finished film the trio is billed prominently (ninth out of 20) but appears only in the finale, singing a fragment of "Let's Do the Copacabana".

== Promotion ==
Carmen Miranda was booked for live appearances at the Copacabana nightclub while the picture was playing first-run in New York City. The engagement lasted only a few weeks; Miranda and Groucho Marx headlined a nightclub act at the Arrowhead Inn in Saratoga, New York.

== Soundtrack songs ==
- "We've Come to the Copa" — The Copa Girls
- "Tico-Tico no Fubá" — Carmen Miranda
- "Je Vous Aime" — Carmen Miranda
- "My Heart Was Doing a Bolero" — Andy Russell
- "He Hasn't Got a Thing to Sell" — Carmen Miranda and Andy Russell
- "To Make a Hit with Fifi" — Carmen Miranda
- "Stranger Things Have Happened" — Andy Russell
- "Stranger Things Have Happened" — Gloria Jean
- "Go West, Young Man" — Groucho Marx
- "Je Vous Aime"— Andy Russell
- "Let's Do the Copacabana" — Carmen Miranda

== Reception ==
Showmen's Trade Review liked the film's chances: "Just the sort of picture the majority of average moviegoers delight in seeing -- delightfully enjoyable, easy-to-take summertime entertainment with amusing situations, tuneful songs, and elaborate production numbers. If exhibitors take advantage of the film's exploitation possibilities, better-than-average business should result." Boxoffice agreed: "There is every indication the picture will be a winner in all situations." Variety also concurred but was more guarded about the film's chances: "Copacabana has all the ingredients of a successful filmusical, including an entertaining and lighthearted story, a group of okay songs, several good production numbers, and a bevy of beautiful showgirls. Film should do okay in top situations throughout the country."

Film Daily advised theater managers: "A potentially sock package of entertainment that was responded to all down the line, and spontaneously, by a sneak preview neighborhood audience. Never does it have a dull moment. Miss Miranda and Marx are a knockout comedy team. Marx is in there all the time pitching to most comic effect. Miss Miranda delivers both song and line to what can be considered probably her best performance to date. Direction first-rate. Photography Grade A."

James D. Ivers of Motion Picture Herald gave Copacabana the publication's rare "excellent" review, and commented, "The improbable pairing of Groucho Marx and Carmen Miranda, both of proven marquee worth, results here in a riot of noisy comedy far in excess of the sum of their individual abilities. Groucho, the most vocal of the Marx Brothers, appears alone, but the others are there in spirit since he brings with him most of the routines which made their act for years the zaniest and funniest of their many imitators. The story is intricate and occasionally tedious when it gets in the way of the comedy. It is funniest when, as towards the end of the picture, nobody takes it too seriously. A Friday night audience at Loew's 72nd Street theatre in New York was surprised and pleased at a sneak preview, but evidenced some restlessness when the picture slowed between laughs." Charles L. Franke of Motion Picture Daily caught the same 72nd Street screening and wrote, "All too funny to fully describe. The sneak preview audience heartily laughed its way through the escapades of Groucho and Carmen (who make a grand comedy team) and otherwise demonstrated a warm appreciation of the proceedings."

Significantly, these positive reviews were all of advance screenings, before the picture went into general release. One late reviewer was Marian Quinn Kelly of Photoplay Magazine, who sensed a glossy emptiness: "Groucho Marx stalks through this, accompanied by zippy Carmen Miranda. If they're enough to entertain you, then entertained you will be because that's about all there is to the picture. Suit yourself on this -- you have Carmen and Groucho to cheer or boo as the case may be. Your reviewer says: Lots of nothing."

First-run bookings in big cities were respectable but unspectacular: four of the five Los Angeles/Beverly Hills theaters that premiered it reported grosses slightly below their weekly average. Elsewhere the news was disappointing. In some areas the film competed against outdoor activities: "This is a good musical comedy that was well received, and more like it will go well here. Average business on account of the weather still being warm." (W. H. Swan, Roscoe, South Dakota). The glamour and allure of the ultra-chic Copacabana nightclub were lost on the average moviegoers, who attended in lesser numbers or stayed away altogether: "Business was bad on this one. The title scared my rural patrons away," wrote exhibitor Sammie Jackson of Flomaton, Alabama. Other exhibitors were blunt: "We only ran this one day and am I glad! Any more than one day and we would have been bankrupt. There is only one word for this: rotten. Groucho Marx needs his brothers and the whole show should be put away and forgotten." (George Mackenzie, Hantsport, Nova Scotia). "There is nothing I can say for this that would appear in print." (James C, Balkcom, Jr., Gray, Georgia).

The film also took some criticism from Latin audiences. Variety reported a Buenos Aires engagement where the film "did not go so well with Argentine patrons [and] had to be taken off after a week's run. Copacabana was considered not too flattering to Latino-Americanos."

== Aftermath ==
It is possible that Monte Proser of the Copacabana nightclub expected the most lavish production possible, so the screen version would reflect well on his own club. The film could certainly have been made cheaper and quicker by any other studio, thus showing a healthy profit, but a lesser production might have cheapened the Copacabana name. Variety commented on the opulent trappings: "The set naturally puts to shame the actual club, which is probably one of the most extravagantly designed in the country."

Copacabana fell short of being the blockbuster that had been predicted. It almost recouped its production costs of $1.3 million, or $19 million in today's dollars (falling short by some $50,000, or $746,500 in today's dollars), but did not show any profits at all. As the original financing and talent agreements were contingent upon sharing in the profits, this caused ill will among the parties involved.

In the wake of Copacabana, Coslow had trouble finding backers for a new slate of six musical features for United Artists. "Sam Coslow requests an extension to December 31, 1948 for delivery of the first picture under his contract due to his inability to find financing at this time." Coslow joined forces with Noel Clarke of Cameo Productions in June 1948 to film a new musical feature at Nassour Studios, which never came to fruition. Coslow moved on to the new field of television, on a less expensive scale: a series to be titled Hollywood Brevities, half-hour musicals filmed at Nassour and budgeted at $10,000 each.

Astor Pictures, a reissue specialist, secured the rights to five underperforming United Artists features, including Copacabana, and released them to the 16mm market in May 1949. United Artists objected to Copacabana being included, on the grounds that the arrangement was "in violation of our distribution contract" and turned the matter over to its attorneys.

Coslow's Beacon Productions declared involuntary bankruptcy in July 1949, and its creditors -- "including Standard Capital and a group of San Francisco financiers," according to Variety—filed an injunction suit. Financier Murray Koch had loaned Beacon Productions $80,000, and had sued Beacon in November 1948: "Koch's contention is that his $80,000 loan was never repaid and that the defendants' agreement to repay him out of the film's profits was not adhered to." The Koch suit dragged on through 1953, as reported by the Los Angeles Times; Beacon principals Walter Batchelor and David Hersh were no longer living by this time, and while George Frank and Sam Coslow held a controlling interest in Beacon, the company was deemed insolvent.

== Contemporary reviews ==
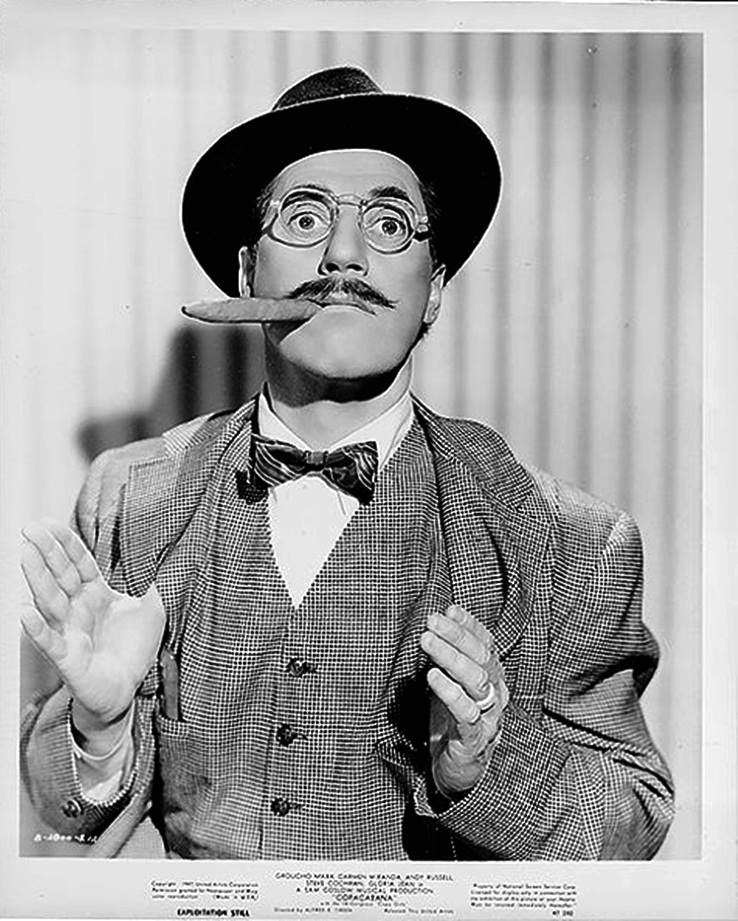
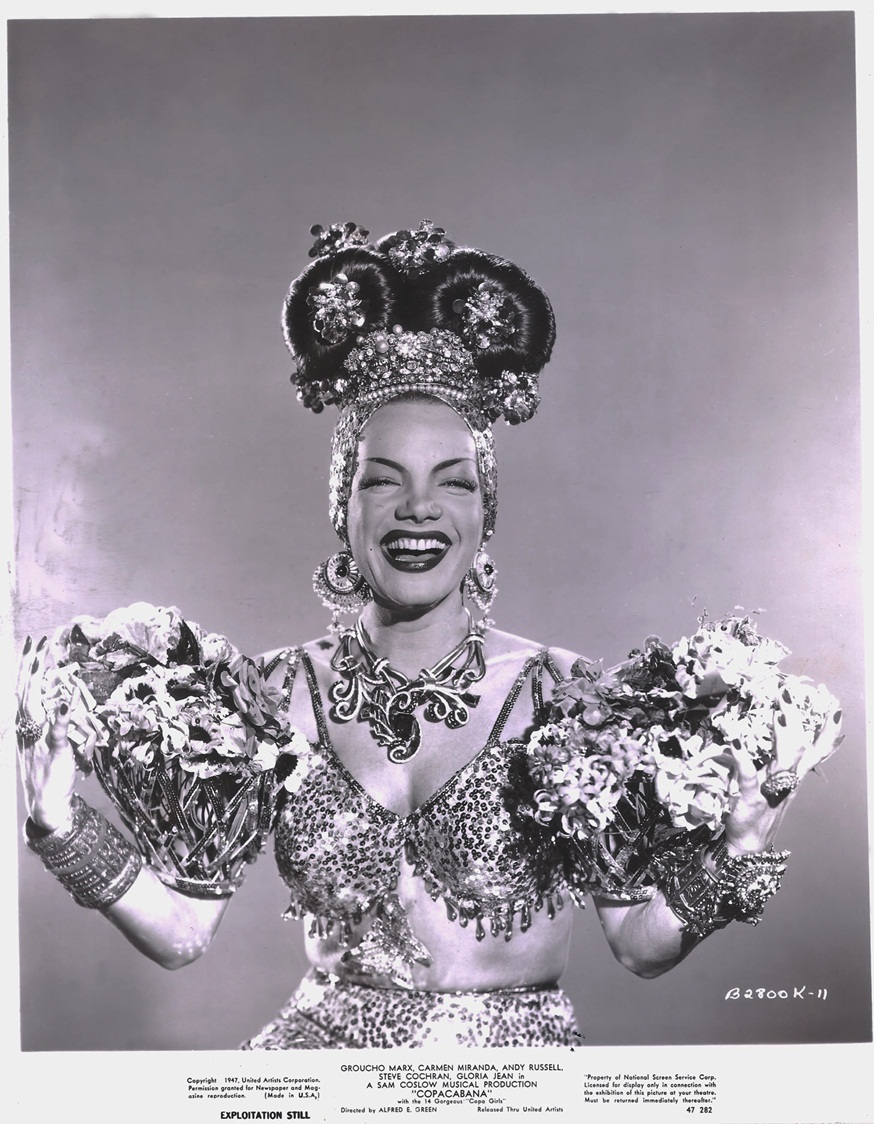
Groucho Marx and Carmen Miranda

Recent reviews of Copacabana have been favorable in the main but not shy about pointing out the film's shortcomings. Tina Hassannia from Slant Magazine gave the film 2.5 out of 5 stars, describing it as an irreverent musical that mixes love and hate toward show business. The review also mentions that despite its funny jokes and good music, the film is an escapist fantasy that reflects the reality of show business and the struggles of artists such as Miranda, whose careers were in decline at the time.

The review from AMC channel describes the film as a peculiar slapstick musical, with Groucho Marx and Carmen Miranda forming an unusual pairing. The review notes that without his brothers, Groucho loses some of his energy, becoming somewhat "thin" when he is not delivering his usual sharp jokes. The text also points out that the musical numbers dominate the film, and the romantic subplot involving secondary characters takes up a significant portion of the narrative, making the second half of the film more tedious.

Rianne Hill Soriano’s review for Yahoo! points out that Copacabana might seem silly and cheesy by modern musical standards, but it has a certain charm due to its period production and the unexpected appeal of some of its comedic and musical scenes. While the film has aged predictably, its energy and pacing keep it surprisingly fun, especially for fans of old musicals and classic comedies.

Craig Butler's review for AllMovie describes the film as "monotonous and prosaic," despite the talents of Miranda and Marx. Butler believes that although the stars do not disappoint, their talents are underutilized in a film that lacks energy and originality, resulting in a cinematic experience without any standout moments. The critic emphasizes that the film drags predictably and lacks elements that would make it truly special or memorable.

Sérgio Augusto wrote in Brazilian newspaper Folha de S. Paulo about how Copacabana is a disappointing film, especially for fans of Carmen Miranda. Instead of being a memorable classic, the film is seen as a bland chanchada, with a plot full of clichés and low-quality production. Augusto criticizes the film’s songs, most of which are described as atrocious. In terms of music, "Tico-Tico no Fubá" is the only song that stands out among the many weak numbers, including "How to Make a Hit with Fifi" and "I Haven't a Thing to Sell." Ultimately, the review laments that the film does not live up to expectations, offering a spectacle without the energy and magic one might expect from a movie starring Carmen Miranda and Groucho Marx.

== Home media ==
The film was released on DVD by Republic Pictures through Artisan Entertainment in 2003. In 2013, Olive Films released a new DVD and Blu-ray of the film.
