= Room Service (1938 film) =

1938 Marx Brothers film by William A. Seiter

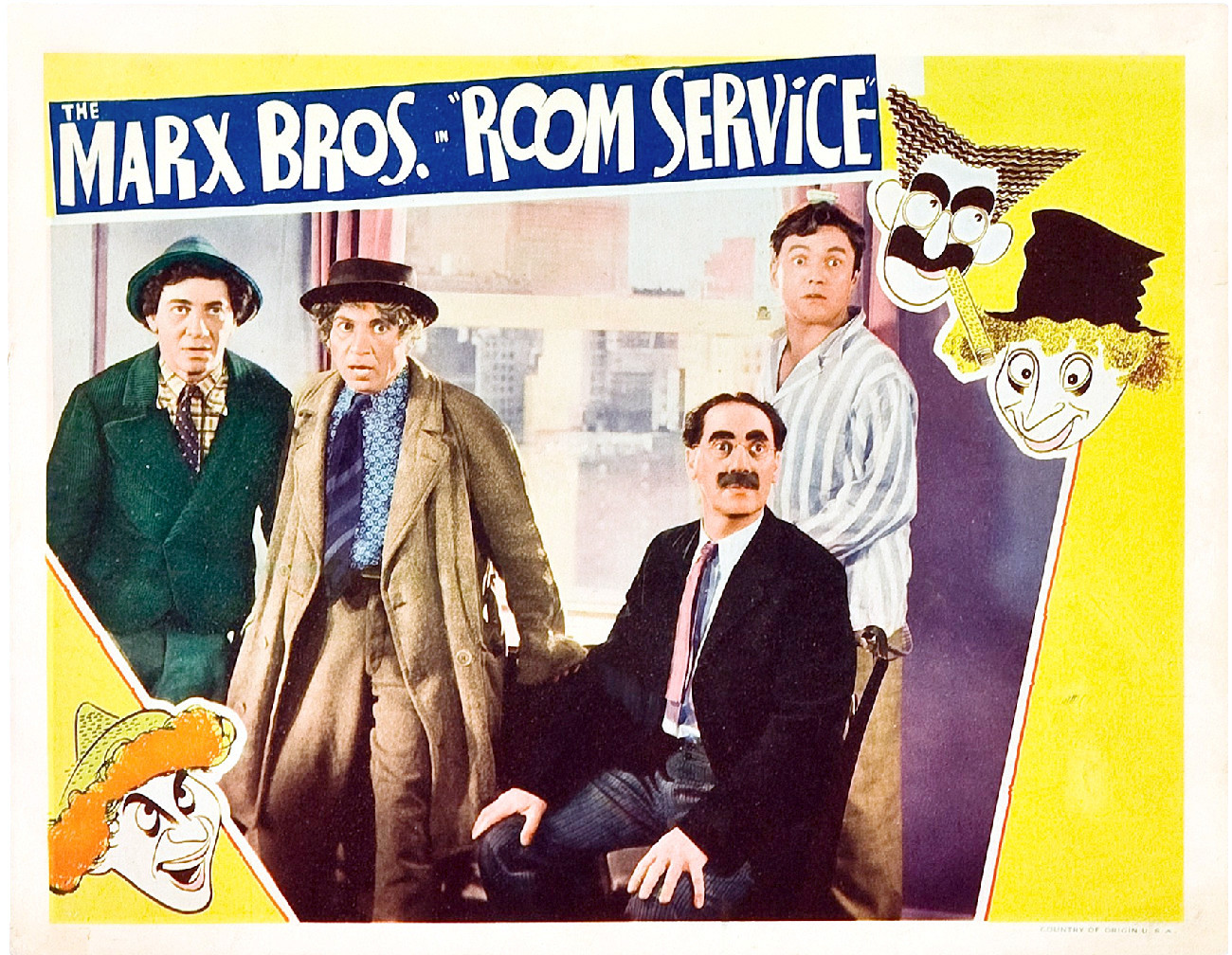
- Lobby card
- Directed by: William A. Seiter; James Anderson (assistant)
- Written by: Glenn Tryon; Philip Loeb
- Screenplay by: Morrie Ryskind
- Based on: Room Service by Allen Boretz & John Murray
- Produced by: Pandro S. Berman
- Starring: Groucho Marx; Chico Marx; Harpo Marx; Lucille Ball; Ann Miller; Frank Albertson
- Cinematography: J. Roy Hunt
- Edited by: George Crone
- Music by: Roy Webb
- Production company: RKO Radio Pictures
- Distributed by: RKO Radio Pictures
- Release dates: September 21, 1938 (New York City); September 30, 1938 (U.S.)
- Running time: 78 minutes
- Language: English
- Budget: $884,000
- Box office: $875,000

Room Service is a 1938 American comedy film directed by William A. Seiter, based on the 1937 play of the same name by Allen Boretz and John Murray. The film stars the Marx Brothers (Groucho, Harpo and Chico) and also features Lucille Ball, Ann Miller and Frank Albertson. It was produced and distributed by RKO Pictures; RKO paid $255,000 for filming rights, which was then a record for a sound picture.

This is the only film starring the Marx Brothers with a screenplay based on material that was not written especially for the team. Less frenetic and more physically contained (mostly Gordon Miller's hotel room) than their other films, the plot revolves around the shenanigans of a broke Broadway producer getting a play staged and funded by a mysterious backer, while evading eviction from a hotel.

RKO remade the movie in 1944 as Step Lively, starring George Murphy and Frank Sinatra.

== Plot ==
Gordon Miller, a flat-broke theatrical producer, whose staff includes Harry Binelli and Faker Englund, is told by his brother-in-law Joseph Gribble, manager of the White Way Hotel, that he and his cast of twenty-two actors, who have run up a bill of $1,200, must leave the hotel immediately or face the wrath of supervising director Gregory Wagner, who has arrived to inspect the books. Miller has hidden the cast and crew of his play, Hail and Farewell, in the empty hotel ballroom. Miller plans to skip out on the hotel bill when he receives word that one of his actresses, Christine Marlowe, has found a financial backer for the play. Miller must avoid being evicted and keep the company hidden in the hotel until he can meet with the backer and receive a check.

At the same time, Wagner discovers Miller's $1200 debt. Assured by Gribble that Miller had skipped without paying his bill, Wagner is surprised to find Miller still in the hotel, now joined by Leo Davis, the play's young author, who has arrived unexpectedly. Davis is also broke and hopes to collect an advance on his royalties from the play.

When Wagner threatens to throw Miller out of the hotel before the backer can arrive, Miller and Binelli convince Davis to pretend to be sick. Hungry and with no money for food, Miller promises hotel waiter Sasha Smirnoff a part in the play in exchange for a meal. When Davis leaves to meet with new love interest Hilda Manney, Englund takes over as the sick patient to be examined by Dr. Glass, brought in by Wagner. To delay the doctor giving his report to Wagner, Binelli and Miller tie Glass up, gag him, and lock him in the bathroom. Simon Jenkins, the agent for the wealthy backer, arrives with the check and contract. Wagner returns and interrupts just as Jenkins is about to sign over the check; Binelli and Gribble arrive. After Dr. Glass is freed, he angrily tells Wagner that he overheard everything while tied up in the bathroom: Miller was about to transact a legitimate deal. During the commotion, Jenkins is accidentally hit on the head by Englund as he chases a flying turkey around with a baseball bat. Jenkins, desperately trying to escape the madness, quickly signs over the check and flees.

Davis returns and informs Miller that he saw Jenkins in the lobby, who told him he is stopping payment on the check and signed it only to get out of the room. Wagner is fooled into believing all is well, and upgrades the boys to a pricier room and extends them more credit. Later, just as the play is about to open, Wagner discovers the check has bounced and has Miller, Binelli, Englund, and Davis locked in their room. They manipulate Wagner into believing he's driven Davis to suicide by ingesting poison. They pretend to give Davis large quantities of ipecac (which is actually drunk by Englund), and he eventually pretends to die. Then Englund fakes suicide. Wagner is bluffed into believing he drove both Davis and Englund to kill themselves and helps take Englund's "body" down to the alley. As Miller and Wagner prop up Englund on a crate, a passing policeman asks what's going on. Miller bluffs their way out of the situation, so he and Wagner make an escape, leaving Englund "asleep" in the alley. They watch the end of the play, a scene where the miners are bringing a dead body from out of the mine. The body on the stretcher is Englund's. Wagner realizes he's been duped as the play is greeted with thunderous applause and he faints when he sees Davis alive.

== Cast ==
Character	Actor
Gordon Miller	Groucho Marx
Harry Binelli	Chico Marx
Faker Englund	Harpo Marx
Christine Marlowe	Lucille Ball
Hilda Manney	Ann Miller
Leo Davis	Frank Albertson
Joseph Gribble	Cliff Dunstan*
Gregory Wagner	Donald MacBride*
Timothy Hogarth	Philip Loeb
Simon Jenkins	Philip Wood*
Sasha Smirnoff	Alexander Asro*
Dr. Glass	Charles Halton
House Detective	Max Wagner (uncredited)

*Indicates the actor created the role on Broadway.

== Production ==
Producer-director George Abbott, who had three hit farces on the boards at the time, bought the play, filled it with members of his stock company of comedians (including Sam Levene and Eddie Albert) and had his fourth straight comedy hit. He also doctored the script, to good effect; credited authors Allen Boretz and John Murray had no stage success before or after. Abbott sold “Room Service” to RKO for a staggering $255,000, breaking the $200,000 record set months earlier by that season’s Pulitzer winner, “You Can’t Take It With You.”

Zeppo Marx, who had retired from the screen after Duck Soup, was now a Hollywood agent representing his brothers. He brokered a deal with RKO to produce the version of the Broadway play Room Service by John Murray and Allan Boretz. The play was adapted for the Marxes by Morrie Ryskind. Room Service was the only film in which neither the story nor the characters were created especially for the Marx Brothers.

This was only the second Marx Brothers film (the other being Duck Soup) in which Chico does not play the piano and Harpo does not play the harp.

Ann Miller was only 15 years old when she made this film. She had lied about her age and obtained a fake birth certificate when she was about 14 years old, which stated that she was 18, just prior to signing with RKO Pictures. In a Private Screenings interview with Robert Osborne on Turner Classic Movies, Miller described her experience with the Marx brothers. Miller described a situation in which Harpo Marx dropped his pants in front of her, beeped his horn and chased her across the set. Miller described her being so "scared to death of the man" and thought he was "crazy", but she "loved" Groucho Marx.

== Reception ==
Frank S. Nugent of The New York Times noted that the film had not changed much from the play and "the Marxes haven't made it any funnier; but neither has their presence interfered to any large extent with the disorderly progress of an antic piece. While there may be some question about the play's being a perfect Marx vehicle, there can be none about its being a thoroughly daffy show." Variety wrote that it would "do plenty of business and satisfy on the laugh score." "Sure-fire comedy smash ... the hilarious proceedings find the Marx Brothers right in their element," Film Daily wrote. Harrison's Reports called it "A good comedy" with a "pleasant" romance. John Mosher of The New Yorker wrote, "As comic pictures go, this ranks certainly above average; it has enough of the Marxian note for that. As Marx Brothers movies go, however, it is a minor effort."

The film recorded a loss of $330,000.

== In popular culture ==
- The basic plot of Room Service was used for the "Monkees, Manhattan Style" episode of The Monkees (season 1, episode 30, first broadcast April 10, 1967, also known as "Monkees in Manhattan").
