= Off to Buffalo =

1939 play

Off to Buffalo is a farce written by Allen Boretz and Max Liebman. It was originally produced by Albert Lewis and debuted at the Ethel Barrymore Theatre in New York City on 21 February 1939. Its initial production ran for 9 performances, closing on 25 February 1939. The 1939 original Broadway production starred Hume Cronyn as Harry Quill, Luba Wesoly as Tuni, and Joe Cook as Gus Delaney.

== Synopsis ==
An entertainment committee chairman rounds up past vaudeville headliners for an annual show. The play takes place in Harry Quill's living room in Flatbush, Brooklyn and in Gus Delaney's hotel room in Manhattan's West Forties.

== Characters ==
- Harry Quill
- Tuni
- Evelyn Quill
- "Pop" Clifford
- Barkas
- Mannheim
- Sprung
- McChesney
- Johnny Melba
- Gus Delaney
- Gabby O'Keefe
- Maxie Kromm
- Fanny Franum
- Gill
- Bloom
- Blossom
- Lottie
- Pepe Brothers
- The Flying Martels
- Phil Gordon
- Delivery Boy
- Johnson
- Laundry Man
