= Helen Craig (actress) =

American actress

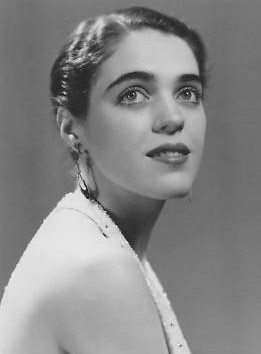
- Helen Craig in 1936
- Born: May 13, 1912; San Antonio, Texas, U.S.
- Died: July 20, 1986 (aged 74); New York City, U.S.
- Occupation: Actress
- Years active: 1948–1977
- Known for: Playing the title role in the Broadway production of Johnny Belinda
- Spouse: John Beal (m. 1934)
- Children: 2

Helen Craig (May 13, 1912 – July 20, 1986) was an American actress, perhaps best known for her role on Broadway as the main character, Belinda, in Johnny Belinda.

== Early years ==
The daughter of copper executive Edward A. Craig, Helen Craig was born on May 13, 1912, in San Antonio, Texas. She had a sister and two brothers.

== Television ==
As well as films, Craig appeared in numerous plays, and on television she had frequent appearances in The Waltons, Kojak and The Bionic Woman.

== Stage ==
Craig was "a graduate of the Orson Welles' celebrated Mercury Theatre". Her Broadway credits include Russet Mantle (1936), Soliloquy (1938), The Unconquered (1940), Johnny Belinda (1940), As You Like It (1941), Lute Song (1946), Land's End (1946), The House of Bernarda Alba (1951), Diamond Orchid (1965), and More Stately Mansions (1967).

Her work in Johnny Belinda required her to learn sign language, which she used throughout the play as she portrayed the deaf title character. She also had to learn to not react to lines spoken by other actors in the play. Preparation for the role included four weeks' study with a teacher who read the script and taught Craig the appropriate signs.

== Personal life ==
Craig was married to actor John Beal from 1934 until her death. They had two daughters.

== Death ==
Craig died of cardiac arrest on July 20, 1986, in New York City, aged 74.

== Partial filmography ==
- The Snake Pit (1948)
- They Live by Night (1948)
- The Sporting Club (1971)
- Rancho Deluxe (1975)
- The Legend of Lizzie Borden (1975)
- Heroes (1977)
