= Paul Ballantyne =

American actor (1909–1996)

Paul Ballantyne (July 18, 1909 – July 26, 1996) was an American actor.

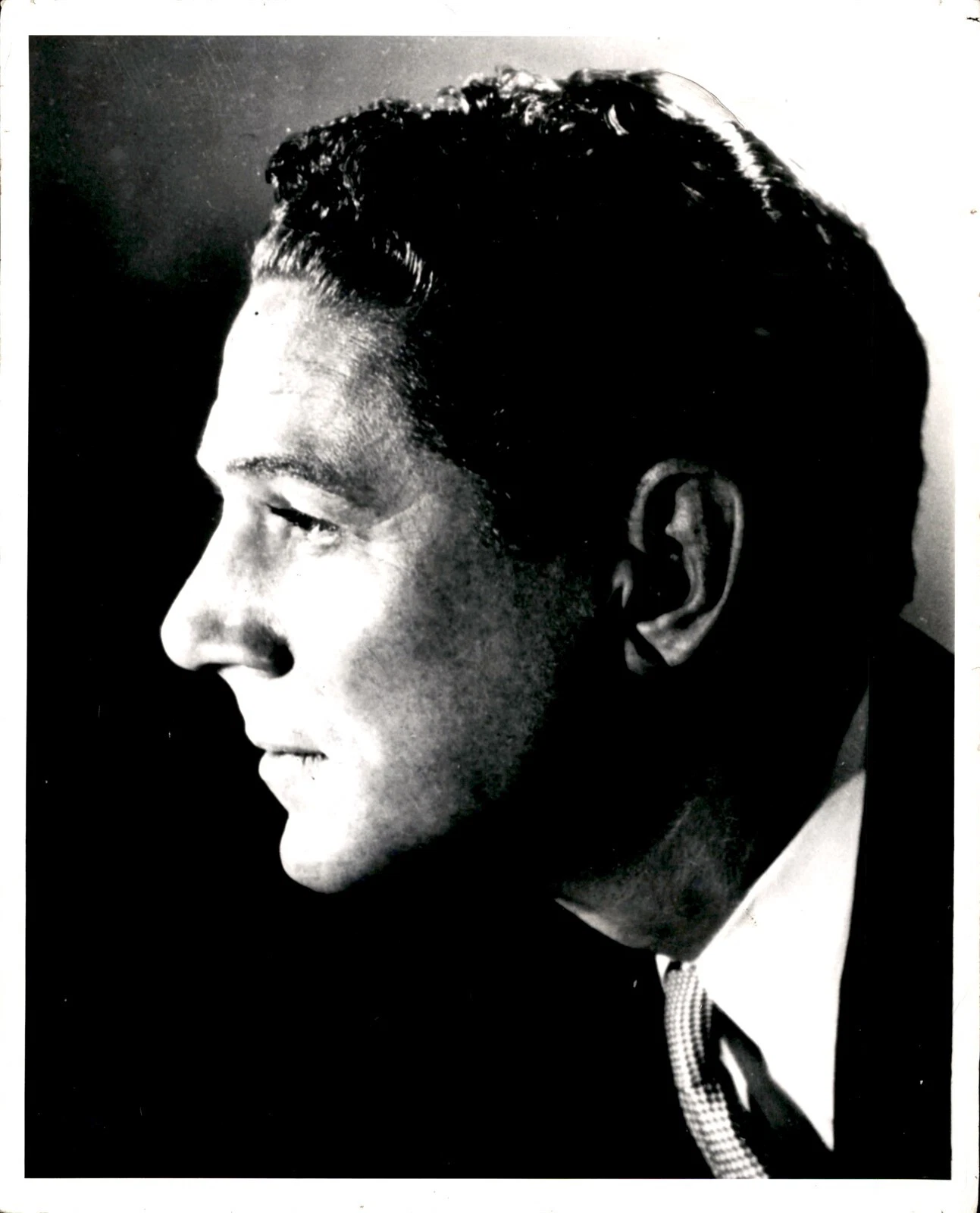
Ballantyne in 1966

== Early years ==
Ballantyne was born on July 18, 1909, in Moorhead, Iowa, His parents were James Carl Ballantyne and Inez Mae Adams. He attended high school in Lamoni, Iowa. He attended Sherwood Music School, from which he received his teaching certificate in 1931. He studied acting under Luella Canterbury in Chicago and served an apprenticeship under Eva Le Gallienne. Ballantyne served in the United States Army Infantry from 1940 through 1946; he achieved the rank of Major.

== Career ==
=== Theatre ===
Ballantyne made his New York City theatre debut on December 12, 1932, playing the Eight of Hearts in a production of Alice in Wonderland. In 1934, he went on tour with a production of The Dark Tower. Ballantyne participated in the Federal Theatre Project from 1935 through 1937, appearing in The Rivals, Everyman, and She Stoops to Conquer. In 1939, he appeared in two original Broadway productions at the Lyceum Theatre: Mrs. O'Brien Entertains and Brown Danube. Other Broadway productions in which Ballantyne appeared include The Unconquered, Love's Labour's Lost, Saint Joan, and The Resistible Rise of Arturo Ui. In 1963, he joined the Minnesota Theatre Company and performed with them through 1970.

=== Film ===
In 1960, Ballantyne appeared in a television production of The Tempest. He also appeared on two televised theatrical anthology series: Hallmark Hall of Fame and Play of the Week, both in 1960. The following year he appeared in an episode of Naked City. In 1971, Ballantyne performed in The Andromeda Strain.

== Death ==
Ballantyne died 8 days after his 87th birthday
