= The Boys from Syracuse =

1938 musical by Richard Rodgers and Lorenz Hart

- Original 1938 Windowcard
- Music: Richard Rodgers
- Lyrics: Lorenz Hart
- Book: George Abbott
- Basis: William Shakespeare's play The Comedy of Errors
- Productions: 1938 Broadway; 1940 Film; 1963 Off-Broadway revival 1963 West End; 1991 West End revival 2002 Broadway revival

The Boys from Syracuse is a musical by Richard Rodgers and lyrics by Lorenz Hart, based on William Shakespeare's play The Comedy of Errors, as adapted by librettist George Abbott. The score includes swing and other contemporary rhythms of the 1930s. The show was the first musical based on a Shakespeare play. The Comedy of Errors was itself loosely based on a Roman play, The Menaechmi, or the Twin Brothers, by Plautus.

The show premiered on Broadway in 1938 and Off-Broadway in 1963, with later productions including a West End run in 1963 and in a Broadway revival in 2002. A film adaptation was released in 1940. Well-known songs from the score include "Falling in Love with Love", "This Can't Be Love" and "Sing for Your Supper".

== Production history ==
Abbott directed and George Balanchine choreographed the original production, which opened on Broadway at the Alvin Theater on November 23, 1938, after tryouts in New Haven, Connecticut and Boston. The show closed on June 10, 1939 after 235 performances. It starred Eddie Albert (Antipholus of Syracuse), Ronald Graham (Antipholus of Ephesus), Teddy Hart (Dromio of Ephesus), Jimmy Savo (Dromio of Syracuse), Muriel Angelus (Adriana) and Marcy Westcott (Luciana). Scenic and lighting design were by Jo Mielziner and costumes were by Irene Sharaff.

The show was revived Off-Broadway, opening at Theatre Four on April 15, 1963 and running for 500 performances. Directed by Christopher Hewett, the cast featured Stuart Damon (Antipholus of Syracuse), Clifford David (Antipholus of Ephesus), Danny Carroll (Dromio of Syracuse), Rudy Tronto (Dromio of Ephesus), Ellen Hanley (Adriana), Julienne Marie (Luciana), and Karen Morrow (Luce).

A West End production opened at the Theatre Royal, Drury Lane on November 7, 1963 based on the off-Broadway production, starring Denis Quilley (Antipholus of Ephesus), Maggie Fitzgibbon (Luce), Paula Hendrix (Luciana), Pat Turner (Courtesan), Sonny Farrar (Dromio of Ephesus), Adam Deane (Angelo), John Adams (Sergeant), Edward Atienza (Sorcerer), Ronnie Corbett (Dromio of Syracuse), Lynn Kennington (Adriana) and Bob Monkhouse (Antipholus of Syracuse).

A film version was released on August 9, 1940 by Universal Pictures. Directed by A. Edward Sutherland, the film starred Allan Jones in the dual roles of the two Antipholuses, Joe Penner in the dual roles of the Dromios, Martha Raye and Irene Hervey.

A Stratford Festival of Canada production opened on May 19, 1986 and ran for 69 performances. It featured Colm Feore (Antipholus of Ephesus), Geraint Wyn Davies (Antiophlus of Syracuse), Susan Wright (Luce), Goldie Semple (the Courtesan), and Eric McCormack. The production was filmed by the Canadian Broadcasting Corporation and was broadcast in late 1986.

A revival directed by Judi Dench was mounted at the Regent's Park Open Air Theatre in London in July through August 1991, and toured the UK in September and October 1991. Louise Gold played Adriana.

The Roundabout Theatre revival opened on Broadway at the American Airlines Theatre on August 18, 2002 and ran for 73 performances and 29 previews. The revival featured a new book by Nicky Silver based on the original book. It was directed by Scott Ellis with choreography by Rob Ashford, and the cast featured Jonathan Dokuchitz (Antipholus of Syracuse), Tom Hewitt (Antipholus of Ephesus), Lee Wilkof (Dromio of Syracuse), Chip Zien (Dromio of Ephesus), Erin Dilly (Luciana) and Lauren Mitchell (Adriana).

The Shakespeare Theatre Company of Washington, DC, presented a semi-staged concert version at its Sidney Harman Hall, November 4–6, 2011, with direction by Alan Paul, musical direction by George Fulginiti-Shakar, and artistic direction by Michael Kahn, with the concert adaptation by David Ives. The production starred Anastasia Barzee, Helen Carey, Anderson Davis, Ben Davis, Natascia Diaz, Alexander Gemignani, Adam Heller, Benjamin Horen, John Horton, Nehal Joshi, Leslie Kritzer, Michael McGrath, Michael Nansel, Matt Pearson, Tim Rogan, Thomas Adrian Simpson, and Betsy Wolfe.

The show's Asian premiere was in Singapore, performed by LASALLE College of the Arts. The production run was at The Singapore Airlines Theatre in March 2012. The show was directed by Tony Knight, musical direction by Bronwyn Gibson, and choreography by Tiffany Wrightson. The cast included Linden Furnell, Taryn Erickson, Mina Kaye, James Simpson, Gimbey Dela Cruz, Elle-May Patterson, Safia Hanifah, Michelle Kraiwitchaicharoen and Oda Maria.

== Plot ==
Identical twins Antipholus of Ephesus and Antipholus of Syracuse were separated from each other in a shipwreck as young children. Their servants, both named Dromio, are also long-separated identical twins. When the pair from Syracuse come to Ephesus, a comedy of errors and mistaken identities ensues when the wives of the Ephesians, Adriana and her servant Luce, mistake the two strangers for their husbands. Adriana's sister Luciana and the Syracuse Antipholus fall in love. But all ends happily.

== Musical numbers ==
Act I

- "I Had Twins" – A Sergeant, Aegon, Duke of Ephesus and The Crowd
- "Dear Old Syracuse" – Antipholus of Syracuse and Dromio of Syracuse
- "What Can You Do with a Man?" – Dromio of Ephesus and Luce
- "Falling in Love with Love" – Adriana
- "The Shortest Day of the Year" – Adriana and Antipholus of Ephesus
- "This Can't Be Love" – Antipholus of Syracuse and Luciana
- "Ladies' Choice" (Ballet) Courtesan, Antipholus of Ephesus, Pygmalion & Galatea, Amazons, Assistant Courtesan and Adriana (not in 2002 revival)
- "Let Antipholus In" – Entire Company (not in 2002 revival)

Act II

- "You Took Advantage of Me" – The Courtesans (in 2002 revival, from Present Arms, 1928)
- "Ladies of the Evening" – Singing Policeman, Another Policeman, Policemen and Courtesans (not in 2002 revival)
- "He and She" – Dromio of Syracuse and Luce
- "You Have Cast Your Shadow on the Sea" – Antipholus of Syracuse and Luciana
- "Come With Me" – A Sergeant and Syracuse Policemen
- "Big Brother" – Dromio of Ephesus (comes before "Come With Me" in 2002 revival, and sung by both Dromios)
- "Sing for Your Supper" – Adriana, Luce, Luciana,
- "Oh, Diogenes!" – Courtesan and Full Company

The 2002 revival ended with:

- "Hurrah! Hurroo (reprise) (Sing for Your Supper)" – Madam, Courtesans, Luce, Adriana, Luciana, and the Crowd
- "This Can't Be Love" (reprise) – The Company

== Casts (1930s-1970s) ==
| Character | Original Broadway Production | Film Version | Sony Broadway Studio Cast Recording | Pittsburgh Civic Light Opera Production | St. John Terrell's Music Circus Production | Off-Broadway Revival | Original West End Production | US National Tour | The Muny Production | Original Australian Production | Mineola Playhouse Production |
| Character | 1938-1939 | 1940 | 1953 | 1954 | | 1963-1964 | | 1964 | | 1966 | |
|---|---|---|---|---|---|---|---|---|---|---|---|
| Dromio of Syracuse | Jimmy Savo | Joe Penner | Stanley Prager | Joey Faye | Joey Faye | Danny Carroll | Ronnie Corbett | Eddie Roll | Ralph McWilliams | James Kenney | Rudy Tronto |
| Dromio of Ephesus | Teddy Hart | Joe Penner | Stanley Prager | Herb Corey | Herb Corey | Rudy Tronto | Sonny Farrar | Martin Ross | Martin Ross | Brian Hannan | Gino Conforti |
| Antipholus of Syracuse | Eddie Albert | Allan Jones | Jack Cassidy | Royce Blackburn | Royce Blackburn | Stuart Damon | Bob Monkhouse | Chet Sommers | Chet Sommers | Ted Hamilton | Hal Linden |
| Antipholus of Ephesus | Ronald Graham | Allan Jones | Jack Cassidy | Ramon Blackburn | Ramon Blackburn | Clifford David | Denis Quilley | John Smolko | John Smolko | David Williams | Seth Riggs |
| Luce | Wynn Murray | Martha Raye | Bibi Osterwald | Mildred Cook | Mildred Cook | Karen Morrow | Maggie Fitzgibbon | Marcie Stringer | Mary McCarty | Nancye Hayes | Carol Arthur |
| Adriana | Muriel Angelus | Irene Hervey | Portia Nelson | Gloria Lund | Victoria Sherry | Ellen Hanley | Lynn Kennington | Laurie Franks | Kelly Stephens | Hazel Phillips | Ellen Hanley |
| Luciana | Marcy Wescott | Rosemary Lane | Holly Harris | Evelyn Ward | ? | Julienne Marie | Paula Hendrix | Carole Woodruff | Judith McCauley | Lynne Cantlon | Carole Woodruff |
| The Courtesan | Betty Bruce | —N/a | Bibi Osterwald | Ronnie Cunningham | Ronnie Cunningham | Cathryn Damon | Pat Turner | Norma Doggett | Cathryn Damon | Darlene Johnson | Violetta Landeck |
| The Tailor's Apprentice | Burl Ives | —N/a | —N/a | —N/a | Marilyn Greenman | Jeane Deeks | Peter Ardran | Virginia Klein | Stephen Heist | ? | Mary Ann Niles |
| Seeress | Florence Fair | —N/a | —N/a | ? | Dorothy Olim | —N/a | Peggy Rowan | June Helmers | Lisa Drake | —N/a | —N/a |
| Aegon | John O'Shaughnessy | —N/a | —N/a | —N/a | Stanley Phillips | Matthew Tobin | Gavin Gordon | Wayne Adams | Matthew Tobin | ? | Emory Bass |
| The Sorcerer | Owen Martin | —N/a | —N/a | —N/a | Stanley Kurtz | Matthew Tobin | Edward Atienza | Wayne Adams | Matthew Tobin | ? | Emory Bass |
| Angelo | John Clarke | Alan Mowbray | —N/a | —N/a | —N/a | Richard Nieves | Adam Beane | Lonnie Davis | Paul Brown | ? | Austin Colyer |
| The Tailor | Clifford Dunstan | —N/a | —N/a | —N/a | Joe Wessel | Jim Pompeii | Rod McLennan | Victor Duntiere | Gary Conner | ? | Jim Pompeii |
| A Sergeant | —N/a | —N/a | —N/a | ? | John Geister | Gary Oakes | John Adams | Rudy Vejar | Roy Hausen | ? | John Boni |
| Duke of Ephesus | Carroll Ashburn | —N/a | —N/a | ? | Peter Binder | Fred Kimbrough | Stanley Beard | Edward Greene | Tim Conn | ? | William Lutz |
| Merchant of Ephesus | Cliff Dunstan | —N/a | —N/a | ? | Larry Haynes | Richard Colacino | Paul Hansard | Victor Duntiere | Richard Judd | ? | James Pompeii |

=== Notable Replacements ===
==== Off-Broadway Revival (1963–1964) ====
- Antipholus of Ephesus: Robert Fields
- Adriana: Elizabeth Hubbard

== Casts (1970s-2020s) ==
| Character | Goodman Theatre Production | Equity Library Theatre Revival | American Repertory Theater Production | Goodspeed Musicals Production | Stratford Festival Production | West End Revival | Encores! Production | Reprise Theatre Company Production | Broadway Revival | Shakespeare Theatre Company Concert Production |
| Character | 1972 | 1976 | 1983 | 1984 | 1986 | 1991 | 1997 | 1999 | 2002 | 2011 |
|---|---|---|---|---|---|---|---|---|---|---|
| Dromio of Syracuse | Danny Carroll | T. Galen Girvin | Thomas Darrah | Michael Nostrand | Benedict Campbell | Richard O'Callaghan | Mario Cantone | David Hyde Pierce | Lee Wilkof | Adam Heller |
| Dromio of Ephesus | Rudy Tronto | Michael Makman | Stephen Rowe | Ken Jennings | Keith Thomas | Gavin Muir | Michael McGrath | Jason Graae | Chip Zien | Michael McGrath |
| Antipholus of Syracuse | Kenneth Cory | Jerry Yoder | Harry S. Murphy | James Mellon | Geraint Wyn Davies | Peter Woodward | Davis Gaines | Christopher Sieber | Jonathan Dokuchitz | Anderson Davis |
| Antipholus of Ephesus | Bill Boss | Dana Coen | Paul Schierhorn | Lee Lobenhofer | Colm Feore | Bill Homewood | Malcolm Gets | Scott Waara | Tom Hewitt | Ben Davis |
| Luce | Lu Leonard | Judith Moore | Marianne Owen | Judith Cohen | Susan Wright | Jenny Galloway | Debbie Gravitte | Lea DeLaria | Toni DiBuono | Leslie Kritzer |
| Adriana | Gale Gill | Lisby Larson | Susan Larson | Debra Dickinson | Alicia Jeffery | Louise Gold | Rebecca Luker | Karen Culliver | Lauren Mitchell | Anastasia Barzee |
| Luciana | Jana Lapel | Karyn Cole | Karen McDonald | Kathy Morath | Marion Adler | Gillian Bevan | Sarah Uriarte Berry | Tia Riebling | Erin Dilly | Betsy Wolfe |
| The Courtesan | Melody Rogers | Rebecca Malka | Cherry Jones | JoAnna Lehmann | Goldie Semple | Anna Nicholas | Julie Halston | Ruth Gottschall | Jackée Harry (as Madam) | Natascia Diaz |
| Tailor's Apprentice | Gwen Arment | David Monzione | ? | Ned Coulter | Eric McCormack | Samantha Spiro | —N/a | —N/a | Kirk McDonald | —N/a |
| Seeress | ? | Rebecca Malka | Shirley Wilber | ? | —N/a | —N/a | Marian Seldes | —N/a | Georgia Engel (Uncredited) | Helen Carey |
| Aegon | Matthew Tobin | Joshua Michaels | Jeremy Geidt | ? | Richard March | Jim McManus | Tom Aldredge | Charlie Dell | Walter Charles | John Horton |
| Sorcerer | Matthew Tobin | Anthony Lawrence | —N/a | Richard Russell Ramos | —N/a | Jim McManus | Kevin Ligon | Marian Mercer (as Sorceress) | George Hall | —N/a |
| Angelo | Lonnie Burr | Jack Hoffmann | Richard Spore | ? | ? | Martin Chamberlain | Mel Johnson Jr. | Gus Corrado | Jeffrey Broadhurst | Nehal Joshi |
| Tailor | Joel Kazar | Randy Skinner | ? | ? | ? | David Gooderson | Danny Burstein | Gus Corrado | Joseph Siravo | Thomas Adrian Simpson |
| A Sergeant | J. Frederick Brown | Ken Waller | Tony Shalhoub | —N/a | Dale Mieske | Robert Lister | Patrick Quinn | John Ganun | Fred Inkley | Alexander Gemignani |
| Duke of Ephesus | Robert John Lange | Bruce Sherman | Bill Foeller | Zachary Wilde | —N/a | Nick Kemp | Allen Fitzpatrick | Marvin Thornton | J. C. Montgomery | Michael Nansel |
| Merchant of Ephesus | P. J. Benjamin | Robert Ari | Jonathan Marks | —N/a | —N/a | David Gooderson | Danny Burstein | Chad Borden | Scott Robertson | —N/a |

=== Notable Replacements ===
==== Broadway Revival (2002) ====
- Luce: Sara Gettelfinger (u/s)
- Madam: Deidre Goodwin (u/s)
