= Sing for Your Supper (Rodgers and Hart) =

Song
- Published: 1938
- Songwriter: Lorenz Hart
- Composer: Richard Rodgers

"Sing for Your Supper" is an American popular song by composer Richard Rodgers and lyricist Lorenz Hart. The song debuted in their 1938 Broadway musical The Boys from Syracuse where it was done as a trio, with Muriel Angelus, Marcy Westcott, and Wynn Murray performing an arrangement specially created for the production by Hugh Martin.

== Background ==
The lyrics describe a singer performing to earn her meals: "Sing for your supper/And you'll get breakfast./Songbirds always eat/If their song is sweet to hear."

The term "sing for one's supper" long predates the musical. An example can be found in Act 2 of the 1607 play The Knight of the Burning Pestle, where a character states "let him stay at home, and sing for his supper, boy."

== Recordings ==
The song has been recorded by:

- Benny Goodman & His Orchestra (vcl. by Martha Tilton 1938)
- Rudy Vallée
- Count Basie
- Mel Tormé
- Helen Humes
- the Mamas & the Papas included it on their 1967 LP, Deliver
- Also in 1967, Cher included it on With Love, Chér

== Popular culture ==
Author Ethan Mordden used the title for his book Sing for Your Supper: the Broadway Musical in the 1930s.
