= Woman in the Dark (1934 film) =

1934 film by Phil Rosen

- Lobby card
- Directed by: Phil Rosen
- Written by: Dashiell Hammett (story); Sada Cowan (writer); Charles Williams; Marcy Klauber (additional dialogue)
- Produced by: Burt Kelly (associate producer)
- Starring: Fay Wray; Ralph Bellamy; Melvyn Douglas
- Cinematography: Joseph Ruttenberg; Sam Leavitt
- Edited by: William P. Thompson
- Distributed by: RKO Radio Pictures
- Release date: November 9, 1934
- Running time: 68 minutes
- Country: United States
- Language: English

Woman in the Dark (also released as Woman in the Shadows) is a 1934 American crime drama film directed by Phil Rosen and starring Fay Wray and Ralph Bellamy. It was written by Sada Cowan and Charles Williams based on a 1933 short story by Dashiell Hammett. It was filmed at Biograph Studios by Select Pictures and released by RKO Radio Pictures.

== Plot ==
Released from prison on parole, John Bradley plans to live alone quietly in a cabin in the country. He is visited there by the sheriff's daughter, Helen Grant, on whose account he had got into a fight and accidentally killed a man in the past. While he is trying to persuade her to leave, a beautiful disheveled woman in evening dress bursts in. This is Louise Loring, who has run away on foot from her rich "protector", Tony Robson.

With his sidekick Conroy, Robson pursues Louise, and Conroy shoots Bradley's dog. Bradley knocks out Conroy, who falls and seriously injures his head. Robson reports this to the local sheriff, who wants Bradley back in jail. Tipped off by Helen, Bradley and Louise flee to the New York flat of Bradley's old cellmate, Tommy Logan, and while staying there they fall in love.

Traced by the police, Bradley narrowly escapes but with a bullet in his shoulder. Meanwhile, Robson has accused Louise of theft in order to trace her, and then tries to persuade her to go back to him. Since she suspects he is of a vindictive nature and is trying to harm Bradley further, she agrees. Bradley arrives with Tommy Logan for a showdown, just as Robson has decided to murder Conroy so as to worsen the apparent case against Bradley. The two burst in and expose his plot at the last moment.

== Cast ==
- Fay Wray as Louise Loring
- Ralph Bellamy as John Bradley
- Melvyn Douglas as Tony Robson
- Roscoe Ates as Tommy Logan
- Ruth Gillette as Lil Logan
- Joe King as detective
- Nell O'Day as Helen Grant
- Frank Otto as Kraus
- Reed Brown Jr. as Conroy
- Granville Bates as Sheriff Grant
- Charles Williams as clerk
- Frank Shannon as prison warden
- Cliff Dunstan as doctor
