= Cliff Dunstan =

American stage and screen actor

- Born: Clifford Dunstan; July 18, 1899; Texas, U.S.
- Died: November 8, 1968 (aged 69); Los Angeles County, California, U.S.
- Occupation: Actor
- Years active: 1932–1951

Cliff Dunstan (born Clifford Dunstan; July 18, 1899 – November 8, 1968) was an American actor known for his work on stage, in film, and on television. He appeared in numerous Broadway productions and had roles in films and TV series in the mid-20th century.

== Theater ==
Dunstan began his stage career in the early 1930s and performed in a wide variety of plays and musicals on Broadway. His Broadway credits include:

- 1932: The Round Up as Parenthesis
- 1935: Three Men on a Horse as Clarence Dobbins
- 1937: Room Service as Joseph Gribble
- 1938: The Boys from Syracuse as Merchant of Ephesus / Tailor
- 1939: Aries Is Rising as Jake
- 1940: The Unconquered as Upravdom
- 1940: Pal Joey as Assistant Hotel Manager
- 1942: Beat the Band as Hotel Manager
- 1944: Snafu as Detective
- 1946: Annie Get Your Gun as Mac
- 1950: Arms and the Girl as General Lucius Curtis
- 1951: Out West of Eighth as Horace MacNamara

== Film ==
Dunstan also appears in two films, most notably in the Marx Brothers' Room Service, where he reprises the role he originated on Broadway.

- 1934: Woman in the Dark as Doctor
- 1938: Room Service as Joseph Gribble

== Television ==
On television, he had appearances in:

- 1950: Rocky King, Detective
- 1951: Shadow of the Cloak

== Sources ==
- IBDB
- Playbill
- AFI
- IMDb
