= Step Lively (1944 film) =

- Theatrical release lobby card
- Directed by: Tim Whelan
- Written by: Allen Boretz (play); John Murray (play); Warren Duff; Peter Milne
- Produced by: Robert Fellows
- Starring: Frank Sinatra; George Murphy; Adolphe Menjou; Gloria DeHaven; Walter Slezak; Eugene Pallette
- Cinematography: Robert De Grasse
- Edited by: Gene Milford
- Music by: Leigh Harline (uncredited)
- Distributed by: RKO Radio Pictures
- Release date: July 26, 1944
- Running time: 88 minutes
- Country: United States
- Language: English

Step Lively is a 1944 American musical film directed by Tim Whelan and starring Frank Sinatra. Step Lively was based on the 1937 play Room Service, by Allen Boretz and John Murray. It was a remake of the 1938 RKO film Room Service, starring the Marx Brothers, Lucille Ball, and Ann Miller.

== Plot ==
Theatrical producer Gordon Miller is mounting a new play, but is chronically short of cash. Miller, his assistants, and his entire company have been living at a posh Broadway hotel on credit, thanks to the indulgence of the hotel manager, Joe Gribble, who is Miller's brother-in-law. Playwright Glenn Russell arrives from out of town, expecting royalty payments for his work, and Miller convinces him to invest in the play. Russell demonstrates a remarkable singing voice, and takes a leading role in the production. Meanwhile, Miller keeps juggling creditors and tries to keep his company fed and sheltered.

Businessman Simon Jenkins represents a financial backer who wants his name kept secret. The backer will fund the show if his protege, Miss Abbott, can be the singing star. Miller accepts the backer's check, but Jenkins is so suspicious of all the hectic activity surrounding Miller that he stops payment on the check.

Wagner, a company auditor, arrives unexpectedly and is determined to investigate the underperforming finances of the hotel. He soon learns that Miller and his company are freeloading, and plans to evict them. Miller forestalls the eviction by having playwright Russell pretend to be deathly ill, thus creating a quarantine situation and keeping Miller's group installed at the hotel. Miller also informs Wagner that his mysterious backer is funding the show—but doesn't tell him that the check has been stopped. Wagner, believing Miller is now solvent, gives Miller every courtesy and accommodation. This makes Wagner himself the unwitting sponsor of the show.

Russell, still faking illness, is forced to play a death scene in front of Wagner. Miller frantically tries to sneak Russell's "body" out of the hotel to avoid any scandal. Meanwhile the show goes on as scheduled, and becomes a big success, with Miller finally successful and Wagner finally satisfied with the outcome.

== Cast ==
- Frank Sinatra as Glenn Russell
- George Murphy as Gordon Miller
- Adolphe Menjou as Wagner
- Gloria DeHaven as Christine Marlowe
- Walter Slezak as Joe Gribble
- Eugene Pallette as Simon Jenkins
- Wally Brown as Binion
- Alan Carney as Harry
- Grant Mitchell as Dr. Gibbs
- Anne Jeffreys as Miss Abbott
- Glen Vernon as Bellboy

== Songs ==
All songs composed by Jule Styne (music) and Sammy Cahn (lyrics).

• Where Does Love Begin? – Performed by Gloria DeHaven, George Murphy and chorus; Reprised by Frank Sinatra and Anne Jeffreys

• Come Out, Come Out, Wherever You Are – Performed by Gloria DeHaven, Frank Sinatra and chorus

• As Long As There's Music – Performed by Frank Sinatra

• Some Other Time – Performed by Frank Sinatra and Gloria DeHaven

• Why Must There Be an Op'ning Song? – Performed by Anne Jeffreys

• Ask the Madame – Performed by George Murphy, Gloria DeHaven and chorus

== Reviews ==
Bosley Crowther, reviewing for The New York Times, called Step Lively a star vehicle for Frank Sinatra; although the scenes with Sinatra "perceptibly hobble[d] the farce." Crowther compared him unfavorably to Eddie Albert, stating that "when [the remaining cast] are left alone to play 'Room Service' they make this an up-and-coming film."

== Awards ==
The film was nominated an Academy Award for Best Art Direction (Albert S. D'Agostino, Carroll Clark, Darrell Silvera, Claude E. Carpenter).

== Riots at Australian premiere ==
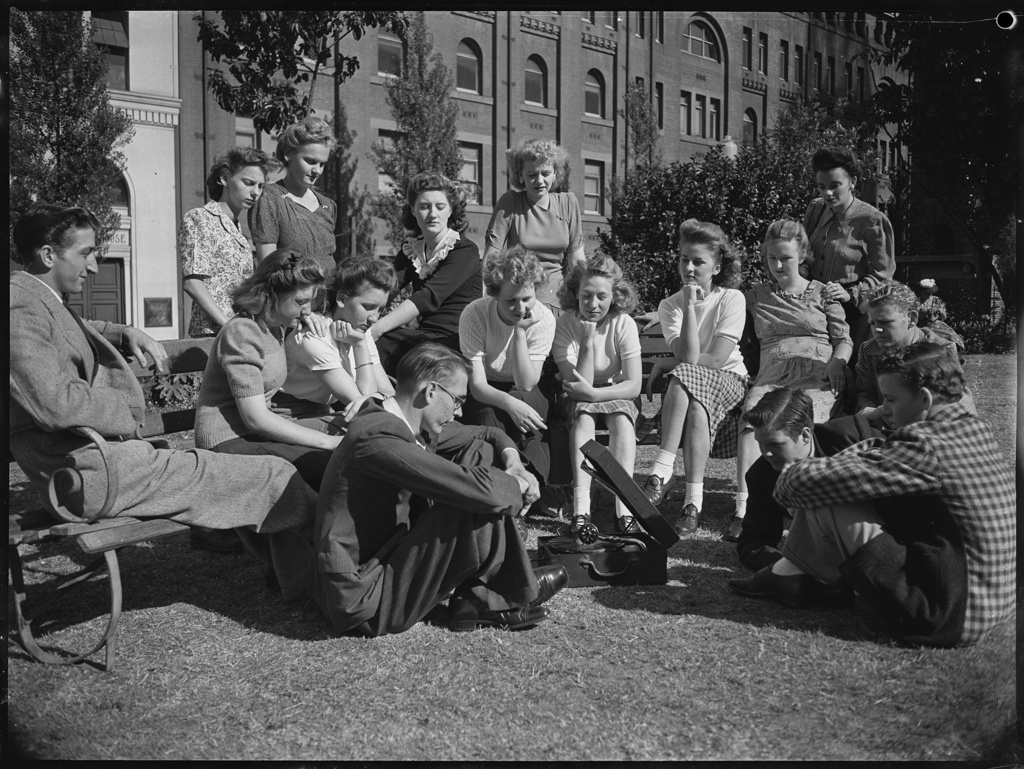
The Sinatra Club of Sydney, listening to his records in Wynyard Park, January 1945.

On January 19, 1945, 30 teenage members of a local Sinatra fan club attended the premiere of Step Lively at the Empire Theatre in Sydney, Australia. They were met by an unruly mob of at least 300 people who were incited to anger by weeks of anti-Sinatra and anti-bobby soxer rhetoric in the media. The mob kicked, punched and twisted the arms of the young fans, derided them as "swooners", booed throughout the screening and stalked the fans through the streets on their way home.

Subsequent media coverage of this incident led to a national debate on the merit of Sinatra's music, his talent relative to that of Bing Crosby and the legitimacy of his young fans' appreciation for his work. An "Anti-Sinatra Club" was founded in Melbourne.

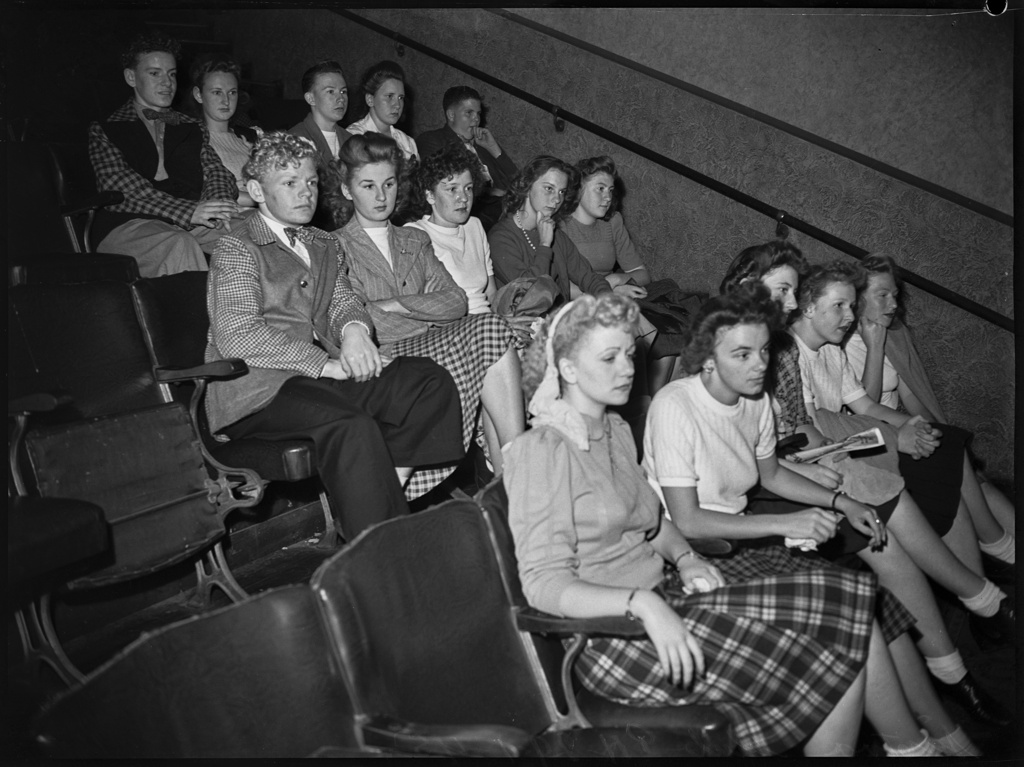
The club attending a subsequent screening of Step Lively at the Empire Theatre.

In March 1945, a feature article on the Sinatra Club ran in Pix magazine featuring photos of the teenage members taken by Ivan Ives. The article intended to demonstrate to the public that these were honest, intelligent young people with a genuine appreciation of Sinatra's music, not the hysterical "swooners" they had been made out to be. One photo depicted the club members attending the Empire Theatre for another screening of Step Lively in a calm manner. Others showed them on a variety of social outings, often while listening to Sinatra's music on portable gramophones. The complete photo shoot is publicly available on the State Library of New South Wales online catalogue.
