= Alexander Asro =

American actor

- Born: 10 February 1888
- Died: January 1963

Alexander Asro (also: Aleksander Azro; 10 February 1888 – January 1963) was a film and theatre actor. He was a member of the Vilna Troupe and appeared in several comedic films in the United States.

== Biography ==
=== Early life ===
Born in Vilna, in the Russian Empire (today Vilnius, Lithuania), Asro attended a traditional Jewish elementary school (cheder), and early on gave 'circus' performances for other children together with his friend Jacob Lubotsky, the brother of Sonia Alomis (born Lubotsky), Asro's future wife.

He later joined the dramatic circles of the Jewish Labor Bund, making his first public appearance at the age of 13, in the role of Yehuda in the Biblical play Mechirat Yosef (The Sale of Joseph), in a production by older tradesmen. In this way he came to the attention of the actor Yehoshua Bertonov, who brought him into a group doing Russian vaudeville; he also participated in guest performances of Jacob Ben-Ami.

As a 16-year-old Asro became active in the workers' movement. After being arrested and interned, he fled to Kyiv, where he enrolled in an art school to study painting, and simultaneously attended a middle school (Realschule), supported by a stipend from Baron Günzburg.

In Kiev he took part in the Russian-language Solovtsov Theater, which had become known for its dedication to artistic as well as commercial success; he was at first an "extra", and then advanced to small roles. He subsequently spent three-quarters of a year studying in the law department at the Kiev commercial school (Handelsschule), then served for a year in the Russian military; after his discharge from the military he returned to Vilna.

=== Vilna Troupe ===
In this period, around 1908, he was active in a literary dramatic circle that had formed in Vilna, including Noah Nachbush, Chaim Shneur, Sonia Alomis, Rachel-Dora Rivkina, and Frieda Blumental; the group worked with Peretz Hirschbein, whose plays they performed and who was in Vilna at the time, and they traveled into the Lithuanian provinces giving performances.

In the autumn of 1915, under the German occupation of Vilna during the First World War, Asro, along with the same colleagues, belonged to an amateur group that gave dramatic readings and performances of one-act plays. They were among the larger group of actors who subsequently formed the association called Fareyn fun yidishe dramatishe artisten (FADA; Union of Yiddish dramatic artists). Asro worked on organizing the first performance; by chance, the local circus owner was willing to have the group use the circus as a venue, since he feared it would otherwise be requisitioned by the military.

The new theatre company premiered in February 1916, with a performance of Der landsman (The countryman), a comedy by Sholem Asch. Aspiring to a purely literary Yiddish theater, and taking Stanislavski's troupe as its model, this company later became famous as the Vilna Troupe.

=== American years ===
Asro created the role of "Sasha Smirnoff" in the 1937 play Room Service, and reprised the role in both the 1938 Marx Brothers film of the same title, and the 1953 Broadway revival.

== Filmography ==
Year	Title	Role	Notes
1937	Bashful Ballerina	Nicki DuBois	Short
1938	Room Service	Sasha	
1940	Comrade X	Russian Waiter	Uncredited, (final film role)
