= The DeCastro Sisters =

American vocal group

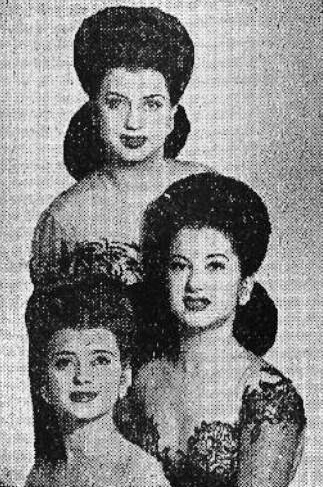
- Photograph from Billboard, 23 December 1944.

Background information
- Origin: Miami
- Genres: Cuban pop; Swing
- Years active: 1942–1977, 1988, 1997
- Labels: Abbott; RCA Victor; ABC-Paramount; Capitol
- Past members: Peggy DeCastro; Cherie DeCastro; Babette DeCastro; Olgita DeCastro Marino

The DeCastro Sisters were an American singing group. They originally consisted of Cuban American sisters Peggy DeCastro (1921–2004), Cherie DeCastro (1922–2010) and Babette DeCastro (1925–1992). When Babette retired in 1958, a cousin, Olgita DeCastro Marino (1931–2000), replaced her and when Peggy later left the group to go solo, Babette re-joined Cherie and Olgita. Peggy eventually returned and Babette once more retired.

== History ==
The DeCastro Sisters began as a Cuban flavored trio and were protegees of Carmen Miranda. They eventually became more Americanized in their performances and added comedy.

The biggest hit single for the group was "Teach Me Tonight", in 1954. The song reached No. 2 in the United States, and the follow-up, "Boom Boom Boomerang", reached No. 17.

The three original DeCastro Sisters — Peggy, Cherie and Babette — were raised in Havana, Cuba, in a family mansion that was seized by Fidel Castro during the Cuban revolution and is now used as the Chinese Embassy. Their mother, Babette Buchanan, was a Chicago-born Ziegfeld Follies showgirl who married the wealthy Cuban aristocrat Juan Fernandez de Castro, owner of a large sugar plantation in the Dominican Republic, where first daughter Peggy was born. De Castro later developed radio and television in Cuba with David Sarnoff, who was often a guest at their home and was also in charge of a planned project under the Batista regime to build a canal through Cuba, which never materialized.

De Castro purchased a co-op apartment at The Dakota in Manhattan, where Cherie Dawn DeCastro was born on September 1, 1922. Youngest daughter Babette was born back in Havana. The De Castro Sisters, always strongly chaperoned, began their singing careers as young girls and patterned themselves as a Cuban version of the Andrews Sisters. They emigrated to Miami in 1942, where they were seen by an agent from General Artists Corporation (now ICM) and booked into the Copacabana in New York with the Will Mastin Trio featuring Sammy Davis Jr.

As their careers progressed their act became more flamboyant, and they worked across the country, including at the Palladium in Hollywood, where they sang with Tito Puente's band and made their first recordings. In 1946, they provided several of the bird and animal voices for Walt Disney's animated Song of the South, including the Oscar-winning "Zip-a-Dee-Doo-Dah". They appeared on screen with Carmen Miranda and Groucho Marx in the 1947 film Copacabana, the same year that they joined Bob Hope and Cecil B. DeMille on the live premiere broadcast special launching KTLA in Los Angeles, the first telecast west of the Mississippi. The sisters were introduced by Hope and sang "Babalu", which was filmed by a Paramount newsreel cameraman and is the only surviving footage of the original three-hour show.

In 1954, the more Americanized DeCastro Sisters were signed by a small country label, Abbott Records, and their first release featured "It's Love" as the A-side, backed by a Sammy Cahn-Gene DePaul song, "Teach Me Tonight", which had been suggested at the last minute by their bass player. The label was pushing "It's Love", but Cleveland disc jockey Bill Randall turned the record over and "Teach Me Tonight" soon became a hit, peaking at No. 2 on the charts and selling more than five million copies. Several more recordings followed, including "Too Late Now", "Boom Boom Boomerang", "Snowbound For Christmas", "With My Eyes Wide Open I'm Dreaming", and numerous albums on a variety of labels including RCA Victor, ABC-Paramount, Capitol, and 20th Century-Fox.

Now major headliners, they shared the bill with Noël Coward when he made his Las Vegas debut at the Desert Inn in 1954, which had one of the most star-studded and publicized opening nights of any show in the town's history. Coward would watch their act every night while waiting to go on himself. They were part of another historic engagement in 1959, when they joined the Las Vegas debuts of George Burns as a solo act and a young singer named Bobby Darin at the Sahara. It was the DeCastros who told Darin that he should record one of the featured songs in his act, "Mack the Knife"; Darin thought it was just a nightclub number, but he later took their advice.

The DeCastro Sisters appeared on most major TV shows including The Ed Sullivan Show and The Perry Como Show. They also made numerous film shorts including Universal's Swingin' and Singin' with Maynard Ferguson and Riot in Rhythm with Harry James. At various times Peggy and Babette took leave from the act and were replaced by a cousin Olgita, so Cherie was the only sister who was part of every appearance and recording that the group ever made.

In 1988, they made a comeback at Vegas World in Las Vegas, Nevada.

In 1997, they were part of KTLA's 50th anniversary broadcast in Los Angeles and headlined at the Hollywood Roosevelt Hotel's Cinegrill. Three years later, they were inducted in the Casino Legends Hall of Fame as Las Vegas Living Legends. Cherie continued to perform and sang "Teach Me Tonight" on the 2004 PBS special My Music: Moments To Remember.

== Deaths ==
Babette died of cancer on January 10, 1992. Olgita died of asthma on February 14, 2000. Peggy died of lung cancer on March 6, 2004, in Las Vegas, at the age of 82. Cherie, the only sister to appear on every recording, film, TV and stage appearance, died of pneumonia on March 14, 2010, at the age of 87.
