= Howard Harris (writer) =

American writer (1912–1986)

Howard Harris (February 15, 1912 – March 22, 1986) was a comedy writer whose credits included Copacabana (1947) starring Groucho Marx and Carmen Miranda, The Jackie Gleason Show, You Bet Your Life with Groucho Marx, Gilligan's Island, Petticoat Junction, and other popular television shows.

Howard Harris was born in New York City, and attended Fordham University School of Law for two years which, according to his family, he hated. The summer before his third and final year he got a job writing humorous anecdotes about celebrities for a trade publication. After that experience he dropped out of law school and started writing comedy for radio for Joe Penner and Fred Allen, among others, according to one account from his family.

Before the Second World War, Harris moved to Hollywood where he was considered one of the hottest comedy writers around, according to his wife Marion Harris Linden. In 1943 he was a screenwriter for Higher and Higher starring Frank Sinatra (see Rotten Tomatoes).

In 1947 he was a co-writer for Alfred E. Green's Copacabana. Also in 1947 Harris wrote the story for a comedy called Linda Be Good, according to the Internet Movie Database. IMDb also reports that Harris was a writer for The Noose Hangs High, which starred Abbott and Costello.

Harris migrated to television and back to New York where he became a comedy writer in 1952 for The Jackie Gleason Show in which he helped to write a segment which featured Gleason as a loud-mouthed, Brooklyn bus driver known as Ralph Kramden. That segment later became the seed for the comedy series, The Honeymooners. In 1953 Harris wrote or co-wrote 14 episodes of "The Honeymooners" skits that aired within "The Jackie Gleason Show."

While in New York City in 1953, Harris appeared as a guest on What's My Line?, hosted by John Charles Daly and produced by Mark Goodson and Bill Todman. The celebrity panel failed to identify Harris as "Jackie Gleason's Gag Writer." That episode is available for viewing at The Museum of Television & Radio in New York City.

Harris returned to Hollywood where he wrote a pilot episode for a half-hour show called Bozo the Clown, starring William Bendix (that episode also can be viewed at The Museum of Television & Radio. In the early 1950s, Harris joined Groucho Marx again as a writer for the archetypal comedy game show, You Bet Your Life, produced by John Guedel. Harris, who joined the show in its second or third year, continued to write gags for Groucho for more than five years.

Later in the mid-1960s Harris wrote for Gilligan's Island and Petticoat Junction. During his later years Harris continued to write gags but had trouble selling his work as younger comedy writers got television work, leaving older writers like Harris behind.

On October 8, 1939, Harris married his first wife, Jeanne Nan Gidding, in New York. Their two children were Stephen Gidding Harris and Amy Lynn Harris. Amy Lynn Harris died in Savusavu, Fiji on September 28, 2018. After Jeanne died in 1970, Harris married the then Marion Linden in 1972. They lived in Los Angeles until Harris' death on March 22, 1986, age 74.

Harris had three sisters. They were Radie Harris, a longtime gossip columnist for The Hollywood Reporter. Radie died on February 22, 2001, at age 96. Lillian Harris Planer, a radio and screenwriter in the 1940s, died in 1990 at the age of 86. Pat (Harris) Liberman was a talent agent and casting director who died in 1984.
