= John Murray (playwright) =

American playwright

- Born: October 12, 1906; New York City
- Died: June 17, 1984 (aged 77); Connecticut
- Occupation: Playwright
- Known for: Room Service
- Spouse: Joan Loewi
- Children: 1 son
- Parent(s): Morris and Kate Pfeferstein

John Murray (October 12, 1906 – June 17, 1984) was an American playwright best known for writing the 1937 play Room Service with Allen Boretz.

Murray was born in New York and attended DeWitt Clinton High School, City College of New York, and Columbia University. His 1937 play, Room Service ran for 500 performances on Broadway and was turned into two films, the first, Room Service, starred the Marx Brothers, the second, Step Lively, starred Frank Sinatra. The play was also adapted for two television productions.

During World War II, Murray served in the United States Army as a captain in the Signal Corps, marrying Joan Loewi in 1941. He returned to writing for Broadway after the war, writing songs and sketches for the Ziegfeld Follies and Alive and Kicking. Murray also began writing for the Eddie Cantor radio show and the Phil Baker radio show. Eventually, he turned to writing for television as well.

== Plays ==
=== As writer ===
- Room Service (1937)
- Sing for Your Supper
- Straw Hat Revue (1939)
- Earl Carroll Vanities (1940)
- Sticks and Stones (1940)
- Ziegfeld Follies (1946)
- Alive and Kicking (1950)
- The Monkey Walk (1977)
- Reitech (1995)

=== As producer ===
- Room Service (1937)
- Room Service (1953)
- Charly's Aunt (1970)

== Books ==
- Fifteen Plays for Teen-Agers: A Collection of One-Act Royalty-Free Comedies and Mysteries. T. S. Denison & Co. 1959.
- Modern Monologues for Young People 1961
