= Radie Harris =

American columnist and journalist

Radie Harris (October 24, 1904 — February 22, 2001) was an American journalist and newspaper columnist noted for her close relationships with Broadway denizens and stars from the Golden Age of Hollywood, as well as for her breezy chronicles on the world of entertainment.

== Career ==
Harris was born in Boston. and had a wooden leg as a result of a horseback riding accident at the age of 14.

She was best known for her work for The Hollywood Reporter (the New York-based "Broadway Ballyhoo" column) from the 1940s until 1989, when she was forced to retire, and had her own celebrity radio interview shows on the Mutual Broadcasting System and CBS networks. She also was one of the founders of New York's Stage Door Canteen and a member of the American Theatre Wing. She contributed to Photoplay and other movie magazines and for a brief interlude during the World War II years she wrote for Variety.

Harris reportedly counted among her steadfast friends such actors as Tyrone Power, Cary Grant, Simon Jones, Sally Ann Howes, Millicent Martin, Angela Lansbury, Gregory Peck, Katharine Hepburn, Laurence Olivier, Douglas Fairbanks Jr., Rosemary Harris, and Vivien Leigh, as well as author Jacqueline Susann. In later years, friends and family would visit her at the Actors' Fund Home in Englewood, New Jersey, where Harris spent her final years.

Actress Coral Browne had portrayed a handicapped gossip columnist named Molly Luther, believed to have been based on Radie Harris, in the 1968 film, The Legend of Lylah Clare, which starred Kim Novak and Peter Finch.

== Awards and honors ==
In 1982, Harris was honored by the Publicists Guild of America. For many years, she was on the nominating committee for the Tony Awards. She was on the executive board of the American Theater Wing. She belonged to the Drama Desk, the New York press organization.

== Death ==
Radie Harris died, aged 96, in 2001, at the Actors Fund Nursing Home in Englewood, New Jersey.

== Family ==
Harris never married. Her brother was television writer Howard Harris. Her sister was Lillian Harris Planer, who wrote for radio and screen in the 1940s.
