= Room Service (play) =

Comedy play by Allen Boretz and John Murray

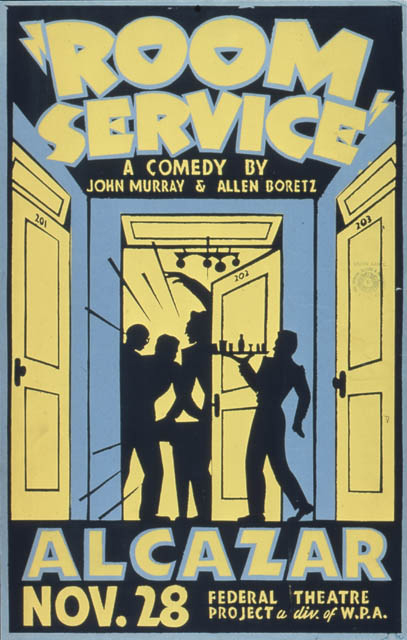
Poster for the Federal Theatre Project production of Room Service at the Alcazar Theatre in San Francisco (1938)

Room Service is a farce written by Allen Boretz and John Murray.

== History ==
It was originally produced by George Abbott and debuted at the Cort Theatre in New York City on May 19, 1937. Its initial production ran for 500 performances, closing on July 16, 1938.

The original 1937 Broadway production starred Sam Levene as Gordon Miller, Eddie Albert as Leo Davis and Phillip Loeb as Harry Binion.

In 1953, the play, was revived on Broadway for a short run of 16 performances, starring Jack Lemmon in the role of Leo Davis.

== Plot ==
The setting is in Gordon Miller's room in the White Way Hotel.

A nimble-witted producer, living on credit with several actors in a Broadway hotel, is desperately in need of an angel with $15,000.

== Original 1937–38 Broadway cast ==
Character	Actor
Leo Davis	Eddie Albert
Sasha Smirnoff	Alexander Asro
Timothy Hogarth	Jack Byrne
Joseph Gribble	Clifford Dunstan
Hilda Manney	Betty Field
Faker Englund	Teddy Hart
Senator Blake's Secretary	William Howard
Gordon Miller	Sam Levene
Harry Binion	Philip Loeb
Gregory Wagner	Donald MacBride
Bank Messenger	William Mendrek
Senator Blake	Ralph Morehouse
Christine Marlowe	Margaret Mullen
Dr. Glass	Hans Robert
Simon Jenkins	Philip Wood*

== Adaptation ==
RKO Pictures purchased the film rights for a then-record $225,000 and used it as the basis for the 1938 film of the same title as a vehicle for the Marx Brothers.

In 1944, RKO released a musical film adaptation entitled Step Lively starring Frank Sinatra.

The basic plot of Room Service was used for the "Monkees, Manhattan Style" episode of The Monkees (season 1, episode 30, first broadcast April 10, 1967, also known as "Monkees in Manhattan").
