= Naomi Boretz =

American artist (1935–2023)

Naomi Boretz (1935 – June 16, 2023) was an American artist. Boretz died on June 16, 2023. In 1985 she was awarded the Artists Fellowship grant by New Jersey State Council on the Arts. Between 1986 and 1987, she was appointed associate professor and director of fine arts at Wilson College.

== Education ==
Boretz received a bachelor's degree from Brooklyn College in 1957. In 1971 she earned an MFA degree in studio art from the City University of New York, followed by master's degree in art history from Rutgers University.

== Collections ==
Her work is included in the permanent collections of the Smithsonian American Art Museum the Metropolitan Museum of Art and the Whitney Museum of American Art.
