= Allen Boretz =

American dramatist

Allen Boretz (1900–1985), was an American songwriter, playwright and screenwriter. The great success of his and John Murray's Broadway hit Room Service (1937) led to offers from Hollywood, and he wrote and co-wrote screenplays from the late 1930s through the 1940s.

His film credits include It Ain't Hay (1943), Step Lively (1944), Up in Arms (1944), The Princess and the Pirate (1944), Ziegfeld Follies (1946), Copacabana (1947), My Girl Tisa (1948), and Two Guys from Texas (1949). .

Boretz' screenwriting ended abruptly when he was blacklisted in the early 1950s. However, Room Service has never stopped being produced by professional and amateur theatrical companies throughout the world, and has been revived on Broadway several times.

== Works ==
=== Plays ===
- The School Teacher (1936)
- Room Service (1937)
- Off to Buffalo (1939)
- The Hot Corner (1956)

=== Screenplays ===
- It Ain't Hay (1943)
- Up in Arms (1944)
- Step Lively (1944)
- The Princess and the Pirate (1944)
- Ziegfeld Follies (1946)
- Copacabana (1947)
- My Girl Tisa (1948)
- Two Guys from Texas (1949)
