= List of The Phil Silvers Show episodes =

This is a list of all episodes of The Phil Silvers Show.

== Series overview ==
Season	Episodes	Originally released	
Season	Episodes	First released	Last released
Pilot		Unaired	
1	34	September 20, 1955	May 15, 1956
2	36	September 18, 1956	June 11, 1957
3	37	September 17, 1957	June 27, 1958
4	35	September 26, 1958	June 19, 1959
Special		January 23, 1959	

== Episodes ==
=== Pilot ===
Title	Directed by	Written by	Original release date
"Audition Show"	Jerome Shaw	Nat Hiken	Unaired

=== Season 1 (1955–56) ===
No. overall	No. in season	Title	Directed by	Written by	Original release date
1	1	"New Recruits"	Al De Caprio	Nat Hiken	September 20, 1955
It is morning roll call at Fort Baxter in Roseville, Kansas. Sgt. Ernest G. Bilko (Phil Silvers) is in the middle of a poker game. The game breaks up when Bilko runs out of money and he can't get any from the guys in his platoon. Bilko finds out that the others were using a mirror to cheat during the game. The Chaplain suggests to Col. John T. Hall (Paul Ford) that he give Bilko an additional assignment. Bilko runs the motor pool so well that he has extra time to play poker. The Chaplain says Bilko should train the new recruits. The new recruits arrive and Bilko hopes to get money from them so he can play in the next big poker game. Bilko learns that the men gave all their money to Pvt. Higgins to hold. Higgins tells Bilko that holding the money is too much responsibility for him. He would like Bilko to hold the money. Higgins says that the Chaplain said he could trust Bilko. Bilko tells Cpl. Steve Henshaw (Allan Melvin) and Cpl. Rocco Barbella (Harvey Lembeck) that he won't use the money to gamble with. Bilko is tempted so he returns the money to Higgins.
2	2	"Empty Store"	Al De Caprio	Nat Hiken	September 27, 1955
The men are still talking about how Sgt. Stanley Sowici (Harry Clark), Sgt. Andy Pendleton (Ned Glass) and Sgt. Francis Grover took all of Bilko's money in the poker game. Hoping to obtain money for another poker game, Bilko tries to sell tickets to a dance, but no one is interested. Bilko learns that Pvt. Higgins lost the money he was holding for the men in a poker game. Bilko comes up with a plan to regain his and the men's money from the three Sergeants. He rents an empty store in town and people start to wonder why. Figuring Bilko is on to something, Pendleton gives him some money to be a partner. Sowici and Grover soon do the same. Col. Hall gave Bilko the OK to rent the store and is now worried about what's going on. Many soldiers have been hanging around the store trying to find out what will be going in it. The Sergeants learn it really just is an empty store. Bilko returns his share of the money to Pvt. Higgins. Bilko learns that with his share of the money, Barbella and Henshaw rented six more empty stores. Herbie Faye as Cpl. Sam Fender.
3	3	"The WAC"	Al De Caprio	Nat Hiken & Arnold Auerbach	October 4, 1955
Bilko decides to volunteer for a special duty because it would provide him with his own personal jeep. Bilko makes sure the other sergeants aren't interested in volunteering and find out about the jeep. Bilko finds out that a Sgt. Hogan also volunteered, but he doesn't know who that is. He decides to throw a party for this Hogan and then hopefully talk him out of the special duty. Bilko even gets local girl Mildred (Jane Dulo) to be Hogan's date. Hogan turns out to be Sgt. Joan Hogan (Elisabeth Fraser), a WAC. Everyone at the party finds out about the jeep. Bilko tries several ways to get Hogan to withdraw her name. He tries to make Hogan feel sorry for him, but she turns the tables on him.
4	4	"The Horse"	Al De Caprio	Nat Hiken, Terry Ryan & Barry Blitzer	October 11, 1955
New recruit Pvt. Carter tells Bilko to bet some of the platoon's money on Bell Boy at the horse races. Bell Boy comes in last and Bilko doesn't know what he'll tell the men. Bilko learns the horse is for sale for $100 and Carter discovers that the horse has a leg problem he could fix. Carter says that when the leg improves, the horse will win plenty of races. Bilko buys the horse and they sneak it onto the base that night and put it in the gun shed. Meanwhile, Col. Hall is worried because General Strait (John Alexander) is coming for an inspection. In order to obtain food for the horse, Bilko has to get some of his men to volunteer to eat just oats for an Army experiment. After a while, Carter has Bell Boy's leg all better, but they need to run him. That night, Col. Hall is awakened by the sound of a horse running. Bilko has Pvt. Palmer (P. Jay Sidney) rig up some lights that the horse can wear at night. Carter tells Bilko that due to a bad tendon, Bell Boy will never be able to race. They hide the horse in the guest house just as General Strait arrives. Bilko can't stop Strait from entering the guest house. Strait is actually happy because the horse reminds him of his cavalry days. Jack Healy as Pvt. Mullen.
5	5	"AWOL"	Al De Caprio	Nat Hiken, Terry Ryan & Barry Blitzer	October 18, 1955
The men are complaining about having to get up so early. Bilko tells them that Pvt. Steve Nagy (Pat Hingle) went AWOL again. Every time there's a family problem, Nagy leaves. Col. Hall sends Bilko to Chicago to retrieve Nagy. If he brings Nagy back by the next day, Hall won't make Nagy serve time. Bilko arrives at the Hungarian home of the Nagys where they are celebrating the engagement of Steve's sister, Magda (Lilia Skala). Bilko wants to leave right away with Steve, but then he sees the beautiful Vilma Nagy. Bilko starts a fight between the two families when he beats the groom's father, Mr. Varga (Hans Schumm), at a card game. The wedding is called off. Despite some confusion, Bilko finds a way for the couple to be married. Col. Hall sends Sgt. Sowici to bring back Bilko. Sowici winds up staying for the celebration.
6	6	"The Boxer"	Al De Caprio	Nat Hiken, Terry Ryan & Barry Blitzer	October 25, 1955
The base will be having a boxing tournament this coming Saturday. Sowici tells the Lieutenant (Frank Marth) that Cpl. Basil Egan (Johnny Seven) was just transferred to his kitchen. Egan is apparently a good boxer. Bilko will be entering Pvt. Dino Papparelli (Billy Sands), who isn't very good. Bilko turns down a bet with Sowici. Bilko then learns that one of his men, Pvt. Claude Dillingham (Walter Cartier), was a Golden Gloves champ. He now makes a bet with Sowici. But then Claude tells Bilko that he promised his fiancée Felicia that he wouldn't box anymore. At a bar, Bilko tries to get Claude to fight a Navy man to defend Felicia's honor. Bilko learns that Claude's hobby is gardening and he is triggered when someone insults Chrysanthemums. Bilko gets Egan to insult the flower in front of Claude and they're ready to fight. The Chaplain has Claude and Egan become friends and they decide not to fight. Terry Carter as Grover's Boxer. Dody Goodman as Waitress.
7	7	"The Hoodlum"	Al De Caprio	Nat Hiken	November 1, 1955
Bilko has the men breaking their backs cleaning the barracks. They discover that he's hoping to win Soldier of the Month and win a three-day pass. Meanwhile, Col. Hall tells the Chaplain that he's going to dishonorably discharge Pvt. Chick Parker because he's nothing but a trouble maker. The Chaplain talks Hall into giving Parker one more chance and he is assigned to Bilko's platoon. For now, Bilko puts up with Parker's insubordination because he doesn't want to jeopardize winning the 3 day pass. Bilko comes up with a plan to straighten Parker out. They tell Parker that they are going to rob Fort Knox and he's going to help. Bilko gives him several things to do in preparation of the job. In the process, Parker is doing much extra work that impresses Hall and the Chaplain. The men start to like Parker and he likes being accepted. Col. Hall comes by and gives the Soldier of the Month award to Parker.
8	8	"Mardi Gras"	Al De Caprio	Nat Hiken, Terry Ryan & Barry Blitzer	November 8, 1955
It will soon be the platoon's annual Motor Pool Mardi Gras. Pvt. Duane Doberman (Maurice Gosfield) is picked to be King. In Doberman's locker the men find a scrapbook with pictures of socialite Joy Landers (Constance Ford), who has just returned from Paris. Bilko decides that Joy will be Doberman's Queen. Cpl. Barbella and some of the men go to see Joy and tell her about being appointed Queen. She laughs at the men and then turns them down. Meanwhile, Bilko tries to teach "girl shy" Doberman how to talk to a woman. Bilko comes up with an elaborate plan to trick Joy into wanting to be Queen by thinking that Doberman is something special. Even after he's describe Doberman's looks, Joy begs Bilko to introduce her to him. Doberman tells Joy to get lost. Bilko tells her that Doberman doesn't enjoy people laughing at him and this was their revenge. Having learned her lesson, Joy agrees to help with the Mardi Gras and be Queen. Russell Hicks as Mr. Landers.
9	9	"The Eating Contest"	Al De Caprio	Nat Hiken & Arnold Auerbach	November 15, 1955
Bilko's Company B constantly loses money to rival Company A. Cpl. Ed Honnegan (Fred Gwynne) has been transferred to Bilko's platoon. Cpl. Barbella recognizes Honnegan as "The Stomach", an eating champion. Bilko bets Sgt. Allan (Murray Hamilton), from Company A, and arranges an eating contest. Allan's entry will be Sgt. Hog Henderson (Bern Hoffman), who has won many times before. Bilko discovers that Ed only overeats when he's miserable. The last time he was that miserable was when his girl back home left him. Bilko finds a way to make Ed miserable again. After a talk with the Chaplain, Ed feels better. Bilko manages to get Ed sad again. It is the night of the contest and Hog remembers Ed. Honnegan wins the contest. Suddenly, Ed's old girlfriend Hazel shows up and they're happy to see each other. The Chaplain makes Bilko give the gambling winnings to the happy couple. Note: In 1997, TV Guide ranked this episode number 53 on its list of the 100 Greatest Episodes.
10	10	"The Centennial"	Al De Caprio	Nat Hiken, Terry Ryan & Barry Blitzer	November 22, 1955
Lt. Barry Parker (Al Checco), a special services officer, has been transferred to Fort Baxter. Parker is surprised at the total lack of fine arts activities. He tells Bilko's men that he expects to see them at the art class. When they learn that beautiful Miss Doozer will be a model for the class, all the men want to go. But, they are disappointed when they have to paint Miss Doozer fully clothed. Bilko comes up with a plan to celebrate the centennial of the camp, knowing the camp has a pretty shady history. Col. Hall doesn't want Parker to find out about the camp's history because he'll probably quit. But when Parker curtails Hall's own card playing activates, Hall lets Bilko go ahead with his plans. Bilko and the men rehearse a play about the history of Fort Baxter. Parker is shocked at all the corruption that occurred. Parker cancels the celebration and quits. Lt. Kissel (Jason Evers) is the new special services officer and Bilko suggests a centennial celebration to him.
11	11	"Bivouac"	Al De Caprio	Nat Hiken, Terry Ryan & Barry Blitzer	November 29, 1955
It is time for the camp's annual bivouac maneuvers. Col. Hall mentions to Captain 'Iron Curtain' Curtis, MD (Arthur Storch) that every year Bilko comes up with some disease to avoid participating. Bilko tries to talk several of the other sergeants into faking an illness with him. They all claim they're not doing it this year. Bilko is surprised when he sees the new doctor. Yet, Bilko is still able to fool Curtis into thinking he has the rare contagious Wilkinson's Disease. Curtis rounds up the sergeants that Bilko talked to and will isolate them together. Curtis becomes upset when he realizes he has been tricked. Curtis sends Lt. Hilda Swenson, RN (Philippa Bevans) to stop Bilko from partying in his room. Hilda falls for Bilko's flattery. Curtis decides to retaliate against Bilko by making him believe he has a rare fatal disease. Hall thinks Bilko is dying until Curtis tells him the truth. Hall makes Bilko do the bivouac maneuvers.
12	12	"The Singing Contest"	Al De Caprio	Nat Hiken, Terry Ryan & Barry Blitzer	December 6, 1955
It is winter time at Fort Baxter and the men are freezing. Bilko gets a memo about a camp singing contest. The finals will be held at Camp Phillips in Miami. Hoping to go somewhere warm, Bilko gets the men to practice singing together. Doberman does a solo and he's not very good. Col. Hall accuses Bilko of betting on the singing contest, but then Hall discovers it was someone else. Because they're so bad, Bilko takes the platoon's welfare fund and bets against them. While Bilko is gone making the bet, the men learn that new recruit Pvt. Claude Brubaker has a great voice. Bilko hears Brubaker's voice and knows the men could win. He tries to talk them into keeping Doberman as the soloist. Bilko then tries to have Brubaker transferred, but it doesn't work. It is time for the contest and Bilko has arranged for Brubaker to be detained somewhere else. The men are sad because they're going to lose. Bilko gets Brubaker back in time and the men wind up in the finals in Miami. Bilko also finds a way to replace the money that he lost in the bet.
13	13	"The Twitch"	Al De Caprio	Nat Hiken, Terry Ryan & Barry Blitzer	December 13, 1955
Col. Hall complains to Captain Whitney about Bilko and all the gambling on the base. Hall tells Barbella that he is to tell Bilko that he is fed up and will be cracking down. Whitney thinks there should be more cultural things for the men to do. At a meeting of some officers and their wives, Bilko can't help but flatter the women, including newcomer Gloria Whitney (Charlotte Rae). Hall tells Bilko that he wants all the men to attend a lecture on Beethoven given by Gloria on Saturday night. There will also be a string quartet. Bilko's men aren't interested in going. Sgt. Allan says that he saw one of Gloria's lectures and she would always twitch during it. Bilko and the men decide to bet on how many times Gloria twitches. During the lecture, Hall figures out what the men are up to. Bilko tells Hall that the men will attend a lecture next week by Lt. Wigman, who tugs at his ear.
14	14	"The Reunion"	Al De Caprio	Nat Hiken & Arnold Auerbach	December 20, 1955
The men learn that Bilko has been granted a ten-day leave and they're afraid he'll hit them up for money. Bilko gets a letter about a 10 year reunion of his old squad from WW2. Henshaw and Barbella find a way to get money from the men so Bilko can go to the reunion in New York City. Bilko arrives at the Waldorf and he's excited to show the other men how far he's gone in the Army. The men show up to Bilko's room. Bilko is surprised to learn that they are all successful businessmen and one guy is a doctor. Bilko can't bring himself to tell the others that he's still in the Army. Bilko has a change of heart. When he meets the others for dinner, he's wearing his uniform. The men are actually impressed and they have a great evening reminiscing. The next day one of the men, Pappy Morgan (Horace McMahon), wants to give Bilko a job in his trucking company. After getting a taste of what the job would entail, Bilko decides he'd be happier with his platoon. John Anderson as Zeke 'Ozark' Rutledge.
15	15	"The Rich Kid"	Al De Caprio	Nat Hiken, Barry Blitzer & Terry Ryan	December 27, 1955
Cpl. Fender is leaving on furlough because his wife had their seventh child. Bilko is upset because he has to give Fender $100 from the platoon welfare fund. Bilko was trying to save up money to buy the Paradise Bar and Grill in Roseville. Pvt. Tommy Vandemere (Mark Rydell) is sent to the platoon to replace Fender. Bilko learns that Tommy is sole heir to a multi-million dollar fortune. Tommy wants a transfer because he knows nothing about cars and he doesn't want to hurt the motor pool's efficiency. The men do what they can to make Tommy fit in. One night they take Tommy to the Paradise Bar. Bilko tries to hint at getting the money to buy the place. Tommy tells him it would be a bad investment. But, because the men have been so good to him, Tommy gives Bilko a blank check. In the end, Bilko decides to not take any money from Tommy. They later learn that he won't get his inheritence for 10 years. Dody Goodman as Waitress. Henry Lascoe as Sam Adamapplelis.
16	16	"Hollywood"	Al De Caprio	Nat Hiken	January 3, 1956
Cecil D. Chadwick (Howard Smith), a Hollywood producer, is planning to make a war film. Benson, his assistant, wants someone who served at the battle of Kabuchi Island to be a technical advisor. Apparently the only serving member of the Army they can find is Sgt. Bilko. General Merritt (Malcolm Lee Beggs), from the Pentagon, calls Col. Hall. At the movie studio, Bilko sits in on a meeting about the movie. There is some confusion over which side of the island the battle was fought and Bilko wants to make some other changes. Chadwick wants Bilko off the property. Bilko threatens to go to the reporters. Filming starts and Bilko causes some problems for Rory Mundane (Eric Fleming), the star of the picture. Bilko takes issue with an actor that is to play him in the movie. Chadwick is furious. Thanks to Bilko, production of the movie is way behind schedule. Chadwick cancels the movie. General Merritt is actually happy about the movie's cancellation and wants Hall to congratulate Bilko. Jule Styne as Himself. Robert Dryden as Sampson.
17	17	"The Investigation"	Al De Caprio	Nat Hiken, Terry Ryan & Barry Blitzer	January 10, 1956
The men learn that Washington has formed a committee to investigate waste in the military and it could mean pay cuts. The committee is coming to Fort Baxter. Bilko actually thinks he can get the committee to give the men raises. He fast talks Col. Hall into letting him show the committee around the camp. Congressman Pettiguild (Ralph Dunn), Clyde Fortright (Howard Freeman) and Alice Colby (Nina Olivette) arrive at the camp. Bilko hopes to show that the camp is poor. At first Fortright has a hard time believing things are so destitute, but then he is convinced. Fortright says he'll make sure the men get more money. But after the committee goes to Hall's house, they find out things are far from poor and Bilko deceived them. Hall tells the committee he'll show them what the camp is really like. Bilko decides to obtain money for the men by playing poker with Fortright and Pettiguild. Jason Evers as Captain Kyler.
18	18	"Kids in the Trailer"	Al De Caprio	Nat Hiken, Terry Ryan & Barry Blitzer	January 17, 1956
Bilko tells Doberman he won a three-day pass, all expenses paid. Pvt. Mike O'Brien tells Bilko that his wife and children arrived in town unexpectedly. They are in a trailer park and Bilko drives him over. Bilko meets the family. Wife Peg is disappointed that Mike can't get any time off. Bilko tells her that Mike is getting a three-day pass and will get a WAC to babysit the three children. Bilko and the men guilt Doberman into giving up his pass. Mike and Peg leave and Bilko is with the WAC in the trailer. Barbella and Henshaw come by and say the WAC is being sent to another camp and they couldn't get a replacement. Bilko is stuck watching the children and he doesn't know how to change the baby's diaper. Bilko sneaks the children into camp. Mike Jr. is very much into the Army and gets the men to be more presentable. Mike Jr. learns that his father is actually using Doberman's pass. He goes to Col. Hall to report his father is AWOL. Hall has his wife watch the children and gives Doberman his pass. Doberman winds up giving his pass to Bilko.
19	19	"The Revolutionary War"	Al De Caprio	Nat Hiken, Terry Ryan & Barry Blitzer	January 24, 1956
Bilko receives a package from his Aunt Minerva. It contains items from his ancestor, Major Joshua Bilko, who was in the Revolutionary War. Joshua was on George Washington's staff. When he learns the supposed great things Joshua did, Bilko feels ashamed and decides to be a better soldier. Bilko tells Col. Hall that he wants to go into officer training. Bilko wants his men to act more Army. Bilko reads Joshua's diary with Barbella and Henshaw. It starts to sound as though Joshua was a conniving and shifty soldier. Bilko still defends him. They then read that Joshua sold tickets for the boat crossing of the Delaware. He sold so many that Washington had to stand. In the end, Washington strips Joshua of his rank. Joshua recommends Benedict Arnold (Frank Marth) as his replacement. Bilko then finds a medal given to Joshua by the British and realizes he was a traitor. Bilko decides to not be an officer and reverts to his old ways. Edith King as Mrs. George Washington.
20	20	"The Transfer"	Al De Caprio	Harvey Orkin, Vincent Bogert and Nat Hiken	January 31, 1956
Col. Hall returns from Washington and is furious with Bilko. Hall saw Bilko and a blonde woman driving in Hall's staff car. Hall also wants Bilko to update his records. Until that is finished, there will be no outside activities, including this Saturday's dance. Sgt. Joan Hogan wants Bilko to repay the money she lent him. Thinking Hall will never let it happen, Bilko wants to scare Hall by threatening to put in for a transfer. But Hall has had enough of Bilko's antics and transfers him to Fort Jackson, Kentucky. Col. Burke reads Bilko's record and actually likes the antics he's pulled. Sgt. Baycher (Bob Hastings), Bilko's replacement, arrives at Hall's office. Baycher is an overly efficient soldier. Meanwhile, Bilko is fitting in quite well at his new camp, with their dances and poker games. It has been a month and Baycher is driving Hall crazy. Hall's wife, Nell, tells him he clearly misses Bilko. Taking money from the men at Fort Jackson is too easy and Bilko misses the challenge. Bilko winds up returning to Fort Baxter and Hall is happy about it. Billie Allen as WAC Billie.
21	21	"The Rest Cure"	Al De Caprio	Nat Hiken, Harvey Orkin & Barry Blitzer	February 7, 1956
Fort Baxter is in the midst of a heat wave. Captain Barker (Nicholas Saunders) ask Col. Hall if he granted Bilko a furlough. Hall says apparently an Aunt of Bilko's, who lives in northern Wisconsin, is quite ill. Barker thinks it is just an excuse to go somewhere cooler. Barker also thinks a talent show Bilko is running will finance his trip. Bilko learns that Hall did barnyard imitations when he was at West Point. Bilko tells his men that he talked Hall into being in the talent show. Barker tells Bilko the show has been cancelled. Barker found out that Bilko lied about his Aunt being sick. Bilko and the men see a news reel about an Army recreational facility in the Rockies for soldiers suffering from mental fatigue. Bilko finds a way to get Major C. W. Friend (David White), who runs the facility, to come and inspect his men. When Friend arrives, Bilko has all the men act strangely. Friend wants to send the men to the facility, but Barker tells him the men acting like this is all a hoax. Barker brings Friend to Col. Hall to straighten things out, but Hall does his imitations instead. Things backfire on Bilko when Friend only takes Barker with him.
22	22	"Dinner at Sowici's"	Al De Caprio	Nat Hiken, Harvey Orkin & Barry Blitzer	February 14, 1956
Bilko is to be best man at the Army wedding of Joe Miller. His men tease him about when he'll marry casual girlfriend Sgt. Joan Hogan, but he says that won't happen. During the ceremony, Bilko starts to worry that Joan may have marriage on her mind. Something Joan does worries Bilko even more. Bilko's mind is eased when Joan says they had an agreement about no G.I. marriage. But then she says her parents are coming to meet him. Barbella and Henshaw tell Bilko he needs to break it off with Joan. Bilko becomes jealous when another soldier asks Joan out. Knowing that Sowici constantly fights with his wife Agnes, Bilko wants to take Joan there for dinner. Hopefully this will sour her on marriage. Sowici and Agnes are touched that Bilko wants to have dinner with them and they decide to show him a happy home. When they arrive at the Sowici home, Bilko is surprised to see them acting like a loving couple. Something happens that causes Joan to leave in tears. Darryl Richard as Stanley Sowici Jr.
23	23	"Army Memoirs"	Al De Caprio	Nat Hiken, Harvey Orkin & Barry Blitzer	February 21, 1956
In New York City, Publisher C. Dunne receives another Army memoir. The title is called "Bilko". It all started when Col. Hall is upset about the monthly reports from Washington. Three of his four sergeants were reprimanded for unmilitary conduct. Bilko comes under pressure when Grover, Pendleton and Sowici complain about his activity on the base. Captain Barker demands that Bilko be punished. Hall demotes him and Bilko becomes the oldest private in the Army. Bilko tells Barbella and Henshaw that it won't be long and he'll be a sergeant again. Bilko pretends to write a book and the others are worried about what he'll say about them. Bilko finds a way to trick Pendleton and Grover into revealing some major mistakes they made that cost the Army. Sowici is worried he's next. The three beg Hall to make Bilko a sergeant again. Bilko tricks Hall into revealing something about himself. We can assume Bilko gets his stripes. Dunne reads that Hall didn't give Bilko his stripes back. Dunne won't publish it as it is too unbelievable and will send it back to the author, Col. Hall.
24	24	"Miss America"	Al De Caprio	Nat Hiken, Arnie Rosen, Coleman Jacoby, Terry Ryan & Barry Blitzer	February 28, 1956
Bilko's latest money making scheme is the "Sweetheart of the Platoon" contest. Pvt. Irving Fleischman (Maurice Brenner) was the only one to submit a picture. Bilko finds a way to get the other men to also enter. Everyone is stunned when they see a picture of Pvt. Hannigan's sweetheart and how beautiful she is. The men take back their pictures. Bilko sees a future Miss America. Bilko goes to talk to The Editor (Jack Orrison) of the paper that's running the Miss Kansas finals. Bilko has to keep this from Hannigan because he would oppose it. Col. Hall tells Bilko to forget about his Miss America plan. Bilko dreams about Hannigan's sweetheart becoming Miss America (Anne Helm) and he is dancing with her. Bilko finds a way to get Hall to change his mind. Word about the contest spreads in the papers. Gen. Merrick from Washington calls Hall and wants the contest shut down. Bilko and the men are already at the contest in Topeka. Josie Hannigan (Judith Lowry) shows up and she's an old woman. Turns out Josie is Hannigan's mother and the picture was taken 40 years ago. Hannigan says his mother is his sweetheart. They still enter Josie and she is a hit.
25	25	"The Court Martial"	Al De Caprio	Nat Hiken, Coleman Jacoby & Arnie Rosen	March 6, 1956
Col. Hall wants to set a new record for inducting new recruits into the Army. Captain Barker thinks they can process over 300 recruits in under 2 hours. General Rogers is coming to inspect some of the new men. Recruit Charlie Chapman (Joey Faye) sneaks a chimpanzee into the barracks. Charlie explains to Bilko that he and Zippo are part of a vaudeville act. Charlie's brother was supposed to meet him in town to take Zippo. Zippo is somehow enlisted as Private Harry Speakup. Bilko tries to get Zippo out of the line but things are moving too quickly. Bilko finally tells Hall about the chimp. But General Rogers swears everyone in and Zippo is in the Army. Rogers wants the records changed but they've already been sent to the Pentagon. Turns out Zippo bit Sgt. Sowici on the finger. They now have the excuse to Court Martial Private Speakup to make everything legal and Bilko will be the chimp's lawyer. Bilko takes his job as defending lawyer a little too seriously. But they come up with a way to discharge Private Speakup.
26	26	"Furlough in New York"	Al De Caprio	Nat Hiken & Terry Ryan	March 13, 1956
Sgt. Joan Hogan is going on a fifteen-day furlough to New York City and doesn't want Bilko to know. She tells WAC Edna and Billie that, while she really likes Bilko, it is a good idea to take a break from each other. Turns out that Bilko is doing the exact same thing and doesn't want Joan to find out. They both learn about each other's furlough but avoid mentioning New York. In New York they each hope to rekindle old friendships and romances. But, neither one is having any luck contacting people. Joan does hook up with two old college girlfriends. A woman named Phyllis, who Bilko once stood up, recognizes him and introduces him to her husband, Sam. Sam gives Bilko the number of his secretary. Bilko calls and it is one of Joan's girlfriends. Not knowing who he is, she wants to hook Bilko up with Joan, but they get disconnected. Through a misunderstanding, Bilko winds up in a steam room at the YWCA with Joan. He doesn't see Joan and all the women leave when they see a man in the room. Both Joan and Bilko return to the base early. Because they wind up with each other's dog tags, they figure out that they were both in the steam room.
27	27	"The Big Uranium Strike"	Al De Caprio	Nat Hiken, Tony Webster, Coleman Jacoby & Arnie Rosen	March 20, 1956
Bilko is at the local paper trying to put an ad in about an upcoming dance. While there, Bilko hears that uranium was discovered on Mr. Harris' farm, which adjoins Fort Baxter. Bilko tells his men he believes there may be uranium on base property and they'll all be rich. He wants Doberman to walk around the base at night with a geiger counter while on guard duty. Things do not go well and Doberman winds up falling in a creek. Col. Hall is woken up by flares and other noises. Hall sends for Bilko to find out what's going on. While Hall is in another room, Doberman is brought to Hall's house and the geiger counter goes off. It takes some doing, but Bilko finds a way to get Hall and his wife out of the house. Bilko has his men start digging in the basement. The Hall's come home early and Bilko makes up a story about what the men are doing. Bilko learns from Hall that some radioactive clothing was buried under 15 feet of concrete in the basement. There's also an oil pipeline under the house, which the men dug into.
28	28	"Bilko and the Beast"	Al De Caprio	Nat Hiken, Tony Webster, Coleman Jacoby & Arnie Rosen	March 27, 1956
The men learn that Quenten Q Benton (George Mathews), a new drill sergeant, just transferred to the base. The men figure he won't last long. Benton and his secretary, Corporal Primm (Don Hanmer), arrive. Benton is nicknamed The Beast and he intends to be tough and in charge. Benton takes over Bilko's office. Bilko bets Sowici that Benton will be gone in a week. Bilko insures Benton for $100,000 and makes himself, Barbella and Henshaw the beneficiaries. Primm tells Benton that if something happened to him, Bilko and the others will get the money. Bilko and the men start to do things that worry and frighten Benton. Benton's been in hiding for a week. Col. Hall orders him to take the men out and work them. Bilko gets the Chaplain to say something that frightens Benton even more. Benton and Primm leave the base.
29	29	"The Physical Check Up"	Al De Caprio	Nat Hiken, Terry Ryan, Coleman Jacoby & Arnie Rosen	April 10, 1956
The platoon is ordered to go on a 20-mile training hike. Bilko has had a rough night. He goes to Col. Hall hoping to come up with an excuse not to go. Despite Hall knowing Bilko is making up an ailment, he excuses Bilko from the hike. Hall mentions that Bilko hasn't been very Army lately and brings up his age. Sgt. Joan Hogan tells Bilko he's scheduled for a physical exam. Bilko is convinced that Hall is trying to get him kicked out of the Army. He decides to get in shape by going on the hike, but he doesn't get far. Bilko then goes to the gym to work out with no success. An attempt to make the doctor think that he can see perfectly without his glasses doesn't work. The doctor tells Hall that he thinks Bilko is losing his mind. Hall thinks Bilko is faking insanity to get out of the Army. Bilko exercises through the night. The next day at his physical, Bilko collapses. The General tells Hall that Bilko is to be on light duty. Bilko should also do relaxing things like playing cards and running dances.
30	30	"The Recruiting Sergeant"	Al De Caprio	Nat Hiken, Tony Webster & Terry Ryan	April 17, 1956
Bilko gets a hot tip for a horse race in New York from an old Army buddy. He is broke and gets Doberman to take money from the platoon welfare fund. Bilko learns that no one can leave the post while Col. Hall goes to Topeka on an enlistment program. Bilko tricks Hall into taking him with. In Topeka, Bilko tries to find a bookie and talks to Little Pete (Tony Galento). Pete tells Bilko where to go to see Lonesome Sam (Paul Lipson). Hall won't let Bilko leave until he signs up 6 men. Hall then makes the recruits stay with Bilko. Bilko takes the men with on the long list of directions on how to get to the bookies. They finally get to Sam and Bilko places his bet. Recruit Feldman inadvertently brings to Police to the bookie parlor. Everyone is brought to the Police station. The Chief of Police turns out to be Feldman's father. Bilko finds a way to have everyone released from the police. The recruits and the bookies all enlist in the Army and Bilko recovers his money.
31	31	"Hair"	Al De Caprio	Nat Hiken, Terry Ryan, Barry Blitzer & Arnold Auerbach	April 24, 1956
Fort Baxter is having their WAC basketball championship. Joan is upset because Bilko was supposed to take her to the game but he didn't show up. Joan learns that Bilko was playing poker. When Bilko finally shows up, Joan tells him she going out with someone else. She mentions the man's full head of hair, but then apologizes. Bilko goes to see Tony the barber. Tony says he has a new formula for hair restoration. Meanwhile, Sowici, Pendleton and Grover are scheming to retaliate against Bilko for winning the poker game. While Bilko is sleeping in the barber chair, Sowici pastes a wig on Bilko's head. Bilko wakes up and he and Tony think the restorer worked. Bilko shows his hair to Joan. When the wig comes off while washing his hair, Bilko realizes a trick has been played on him. And Bilko knows who did it. Bilko tells Tony, who had just spent much money buying more chemicals for the restorer. Bilko finds a way to retaliate against Sowici, Pendleton and Grover and he recovers Tony's money as well.
32	32	"The Con Men"	Al De Caprio	Nat Hiken & Tony Webster	May 1, 1956
Doberman receives a check for $500 and everyone wants to be his friend. He wants to give the money to Bilko to invest in a scheme. Bilko is touched but wants Doberman to use the money. Because Doberman dresses like a slob, Bilko thinks he should get new clothes. Bilko sends him to cash the check and then meet him at a hotel lounge. At the lounge, Jean (Sally Mansfield), Steve (Grant Richards) and Chester (Danny Dayton) see Doberman as an easy mark. Steve and Jean claim to be from Doberman's home town. Chester comes by and claims to be from the same town. They are con artists and Doberman loses his money in a poker game. Bilko goes to the lounge intending to con the con artists. The three pull the same scam on Bilko that they used on Doberman, but he's on to them. Bilko wins Doberman's money back and money for the platoon welfare fund. Chester pulls a gun on Bilko. Just then, Bilko's men enter the room and grab the gun. Doberman tells Bilko that he just bought the hotel from the owner for $500. Bilko is afraid Doberman was scammed again.
33	33	"War Games"	Al De Caprio	Nat Hiken & Arnold Auerbach	May 8, 1956
Bilko is caught trying to sneak off base. He was supposed to be best man at his friend Harry's wedding. Col. Hall won't let him go as he was to train new recruits. Harry calls and Bilko tells him he'll have to postpone the wedding. Hall says Bilko can go this Friday night. That's the night of the war games between the Army and the National Guard and Hall doesn't want Bilko around. The recruits arrive and Bilko finds a way to not have to personally train them. Hall is going over plans for the war games. It appears Bilko's recruits are the best squad on the base and are supposed to lead the attack. Bilko is told he has to lead his squad. Bilko sneaks out and heads to the wedding. His squad thinks he's heading to the games and follows him. Everyone follows Bilko to the wedding including Hall. It turns out the bride's father is the Captain of the National Guard. Hall captures him and wins the war games. They then finish the wedding.
34	34	"Bilko on Wall St."	Al De Caprio	Nat Hiken & Tony Webster	May 15, 1956
Bilko is to spend a furlough in New York with an old Army buddy, Morgan Twinhasey (Eddie Phillips). Morgan apparently is a Wall Street big shot and a millionaire. When Bilko arrives, he finds out that Morgan is not rich by any means. Morgan is head bookkeeper at an investment firm. He lives in a tiny apartment with his wife Brenda and baby girl, Bermuda. Bilko wants to help Morgan make more money. Bilko shows up at the office of Butterworth, Butterworth and Butterworth Investments where Morgan works. They think he's with Spencer, Hubell and Harris Banking, a firm they want to get an account with. Bilko tells Morgan that he got them to raise his salary to $200 a week. Actually, Butterworth let's Morgan go as they think the other firm wants him and they want to please the firm. Bilko finds a way for the Butterworth's to take Morgan back and at a salary of $250.

=== Season 2 (1956–57) ===
No. overall	No. in season	Title	Directed by	Written by	Original release date
35	1	"Platoon in the Movies"	Al De Caprio	Story by : Nat Hiken; Teleplay by : Nat Hiken, Tony Webster & Billy Friedberg	September 18, 1956
Lt. Pierson is thinking of using Bilko's men in an Army training film about the maintenance of the spark plug. It will be up to the cameraman and he picks Pvt. Doberman as one of the leads. They'll come by that night and pick one more person. Pierson picks a couple of men, but Bilko makes up something wrong with each of them. Bilko winds up being chosen. The next day, filming starts and Doberman panics. Pierson decides to go to another Army base and will pick up his filming equipment the next day. Bilko wants to shoot his own film. In Washington, General Cobb and his wife are to view the training film. It turns out to be a musical with Doberman as a new spark plug and Bilko as an old plug. The General is angry, but his wife is enjoying the film. He calls Pierson and wants to talk to Bilko. But after something his wife says, the General congratulates Bilko.
36	2	"It's for the Birds"	Al De Caprio	Story by : Nat Hiken; Teleplay by : Nat Hiken & Billy Friedberg	September 25, 1956
Bilko and his men watch a sailor win on 'The $64,000 Question' TV show. He would like to see an Army man on the show. Bilko learns that Cpl. Ed Honnegan (Fred Gwynne) is an expert on birds. Bilko manages to get Honnegan on the show. If he wins, the platoon will split the money. Ed wins $32,000 and will return next week. But then Honnegan is hit in the head and struck by an unexpected case of amnesia. Bilko comes up with a plan to still win it all. The next week on the show, Bilko is allowed to be in the booth with Honnegan. Pvt. Palmer (P. Jay Sidney) has rigged up a small walkie talkie ear piece for Bilko. The men are back at the hotel room and will try to find the answers. Bilko and Honnegan answer the first several questions correctly. Just before the last answer, the walkie talkie goes bad. Honnegan hits his head again and his knowledge of birds is back. He is able to answer the last question and wins the $64,000. Honnegan tells the Master of Ceremonies that he's going to donate the money to bird watchers clubs. John Gibson as Chaplain.
37	3	"Bilko Goes to College"	Al De Caprio	Nat Hiken, Leonard Stern, Tony Webster & Billy Friedberg	October 2, 1956
The Dean of Schmill University is reprimanding student Justin Pierce for gambling. Bilko and his men are to give the ROTC unit of the school training in vehicle maintenance. Bilko learns that Justin is the son of a millionaire and he likes to gamble. Justin owes Little Louie (Bern Hoffman) $1000. Thinking Justin might do him a favor one day, Bilko wants to help him. The two go to see Big Ed McMillan (Robert Strauss), head of the local gambling syndicate. McMillan wants the money from Justin. Bilko hopes to get even with McMillan by placing a 1000-1 bet on Schmill's football team to beat the championship team from Notre Dame. Schmill has never scored against Notre Dame. McMillan gladly takes the bet. Bilko uses a little trickery to make the Schmill team sound invincible. McMillan tries to buy his way out of the bet, but Bilko wants much more than what he's offering. After some more trickery, McMillan returns with the amount Bilko wanted. But Bilko is told that Schmill will actually win and he stands to win $100,000. He turns down McMillan. Schmill loses. Bilko doesn't get any money. McMillan decides to go into another business and he cancels Justin's debt.
38	4	"The Girl from Italy"	Al De Caprio	Nat Hiken, Leonard Stern, Billy Friedberg & Tony Webster	October 9, 1956
Bilko, Henshaw, and Barbella go to New York to see My Fair Lady on Broadway. The show is sold out for 6 months, but Bilko finds a way to get tickets. Barbella is also in town to go to his brother's wedding. He learns that the wedding is off. His brother Angelo just met Rosa when she got off the boat from Italy that morning. It was an old country prearranged wedding and Angelo isn't interested. Bilko and Barbella go to Barbella's house and meet Rosa and her Aunt and Uncle. Inspired by My Fair Lady, Bilko decides to make Rosa more desirable so Angelo will want to marry her. It takes some deceiving and manipulating, but Bilko makes Rosa irresistible. Angelo sees her and is smitten. Bilko pretends to want Rosa to make Angelo jealous. Angelo says he loves Rosa and will marry her.
39	5	"The Face on the Recruiting Poster"	Al De Caprio	Nat Hiken, Tony Webster, Leonard Stern & Billy Friedberg	October 16, 1956
Pvt. Mike McCluskey (Eric Fleming) is assigned to Bilko's platoon. McCluskey tells Bilko that he's been transferred from base to base because the WACs wind up fighting over him. Bilko thinks he's making it all up. But when Bilko takes McCluskey to the office to check him in, all the WACs do start fawning over him. Bilko sees money to be made making McCluskey a movie star. He takes pictures of Mike and sends them to all the movie studios. They are all sent back because the pictures were unsolicited. Bilko hopes to get McCluskey's face on the new Army recruiting poster. Bilko talks Col. Hall into helping, but rules say that the men have to take a test on military procedure to get into the competition. Doberman unwittingly winds up being picked as the best-looking soldier on the camp because he scored the highest on the test. Neither Bilko nor Hall can bring himself to talk Doberman out of it. At the Pentagon, when the Captain (Nelson Olmsted) sees Doberman, he sends all the photographers out of the room. They all hope that General Kramer can tell Doberman he's not good looking enough to be on the poster. Kramer looks a lot like Doberman and he wants Doberman on the poster. Bilko finds a way to have Doberman on the poster, but not really seeing his face. Tom Poston as Lieutenant Franklin.
40	6	"Bilko's War Against Culture"	Al De Caprio	Story by : Aaron Ruben and Phil Sharp; Teleplay by : Nat Hiken, Aaron Ruben and Phil Sharp	October 23, 1956
Col. Hall learns another special services officer, Lt. Roxberry (Dina Merrill), is being sent to camp. Roxberry is to introduce new cultural programs with the purpose of discouraging gambling. Hall tells Bilko about it. Lt. Roxberry arrives at Hall's office. Hall was expecting a man, but Roxberry is a beautiful woman. Bilko comes by and is also surprised. Roxberry introduces them to her assistant, WAC Corporal Sandberg (Mara McAfee), who is also beautiful. The classes start that evening and Bilko is worried it will interfere with his gambling ventures. Despite promising Bilko they wouldn't, once the men see the beautiful women, they sign up for the classes. Bilko finds a way to get the men to leave the classes. Discouraged, Lt. Roxberry tells Hall that she'll be leaving the camp. Bilko learns that this was Roxberry's first assignment and he feels a little bad. It is not long before Bilko finds a way to covertly incorporate gambling into the cultural classes. Roxberry feels elated and says the men don't need her anymore. The men actually start to like the cultural classes.
41	7	"The Song of the Motor Pool"	Al De Caprio	Nat Hiken, Billy Friedberg, Tony Webster and Leonard Stern	October 30, 1956
The Army is putting on a new TV show and is looking for talent. Bilko and his men sing several songs for Captain Buckmaster (David White), the talent scout. He is not impressed. Later, Bilko thinks his motor pool should have its own song. Bilko hears Paparelli (Billy Sands) singing a melody while in the shower. When Paparelli says he made the tune up, Bilko is convinced he's found the song. But Paparelli is having a hard time remembering the tune and only sings it in the shower. Pvt. Palmer hooks up a microphone in the shower and they are able to record the melody. Bilko calls Buckmaster, but he hangs up. Bilko figures Col. Hall will help them if he thinks he wrote the song. They subliminally get the melody into Hall's head. Hall let's Bilko write words to it. Bilko gets Hall to call Buckmaster. The men will go to New York and perform the song on TV. Right before Bilko's men are to perform the song, they learn that the melody is from a Signal Corps song. Terry Carter as Pvt. Sugie Sugarman.
42	8	"Bilko's Engagement"	Al De Caprio	Nat Hiken, Billy Friedberg, Tony Webster and Leonard Stern	November 6, 1956
During a poker game, Cpl. Henshaw tells Bilko that he saw Joan in town with Mulligan, a handsome sergeant from administration. Bilko says he's not worried about Joan, but he really is. Bilko confronts Joan when she and Mulligan return to camp. She tells him she's not going to sit around every Saturday night while he plays poker. She says she never wants to see him again. Pvt. Kadowski (Karl Lukas) tells Bilko he had a fight with his girlfriend. He bought a present for her and it is at the jewelers. Bilko sends Doberman to pick up Kadowski's present and gives him money to buy Joan a present. Doberman mixes the packages up and delivers Kadowski's engagement ring to Joan. Joan is thrilled and word quickly spreads around the camp. Joan says that her parents are coming in from out of town. Bilko behaves obnoxiously when he meets Joan's parents hoping they won't approve of him. But they're fun loving people and enjoy it. Bilko then acts like a drunk when he meets Joan's Aunt Martha (Philippa Bevans) and Emily. Turns out they're drinkers as well. Bilko wants Burlesque dancer Tessie to pretend to be his aunt at the reception. But she shows up very dignified. Joan learns the ring wasn't meant for her and the wedding is off.
43	9	"A Mess Sergeant Can't Win"	Al De Caprio	Nat Hiken, Tony Webster, Leonard Stern & Billy Friedberg	November 13, 1956
Bilko and the men learn that Sgt. Rupert B. Ritzik's (Joe E. Ross) time is up and he's not re-enlisting. There will be a going away party for him and everyone chips in some money. Because Ritzik always loses money to Bilko, he's not invited. Bilko goes to see Rupert and is told by his wife Emma (Beatrice Pons) that they're going to open up a diner in Peoria for $400. Bilko wants to help Ritzik by raising another $400 for him. Bilko sells all his possessions and tries to give Ritzik the money. Rupert refuses to take the money thinking there's a catch to it. Bilko now wants to lose the money to Ritzik with a rigged bet. But with Rupert's bad luck, no matter what the bet Bilko always wins. Bilko finally finds a bet that Ritzik wins. Because he believes his luck has changed, Ritzik signs up for four more years. Note: Joe E. Ross and Beatrice Pons would later team up as husband and wife in the sitcom "Car 54, Where Are You?".
44	10	"Doberman's Sister"	Al De Caprio	Nat Hiken, Billy Friedberg, Tony Webster and Leonard Stern	November 20, 1956
This coming Saturday is Fort Baxter Day at the camp. It is tradition for the platoon to date each other's sisters. The guys are having a hard time picking their dates. They then learn that Doberman's sister, Diane, is coming this year. Now all the men pick a date. Bilko tricks Pvt. Fielding Zimmerman (Mickey Freeman) into taking Diane. Bilko invents the mythical Musselman's Law, where the uglier the brother is, the more beautiful the sister is. All the men now have dreams about beautiful Diane. After reading a Movie magazine, Bilko has a dream that Diane is a Marilyn Monroe lookalike. Bilko then tricks Zimmerman into taking Joan and Bilko will take Diane. Bilko makes up a story to Joan about why he can't go out with her. Bilko arranges for a quiet candlelit dinner at a local restaurant. Joan catches Bilko at the bus station and knows he's there to pick up another woman. Diane arrives and she looks exactly like Doberman. When Joan sees Diane, she thinks it was kind of Bilko to take her on the date.
45	11	"Where There's a Will"	Al De Caprio	Nat Hiken, Leonard Stern, Billy Friedberg & Tony Webster	November 27, 1956
Bilko and the men say goodbye to Gregory Chickering (Bruce Kirby), who is returning to civilian life. But not before Bilko gets some money out of him. Later, they see in the paper that Chickering's wealthy Uncle passed away and Greg is in the will. At the reading of the will, Greg only gets $1 and a parrot. Attorney Garner (Harry Bannister) believes Greg was cheated out of his inheritance by his devious relatives. Greg calls Bilko for help. Bilko and some of his men head to Detroit and meet up with Greg. The relatives are at the Uncle's mansion. Bilko cooks up a scheme involving a whole host of nefarious characters and a treasure map worth $30 million. They lead the relatives to believe that the parrot holds the secret of the treasure map. Bilko calls Greg and tells him to give the relatives the parrot in exchange for everything they inherited. At the base, Greg visits and says that he kept the parrot because it knows where a fortune is buried. Martha Greenhouse as Esther Reeves.
46	12	"Bilko's Tax Trouble"	Al De Caprio	Nat Hiken, Leonard Stern, Billy Friedberg & Tony Webster	December 4, 1956
Mr. Tom Elliott (Dan Frazer), an investigator for the Bureau of Internal Revenue, is wrapping up cases from 1953. Elliott wants to send a letter of investigation to a Mr. Billings. The secretary accidentally grabs Bilko's file. Bilko receives the letter and goes to Internal Revenue office. Elliott tells Bilko it was a mistake. But when he looks at Bilko's file, Elliott wants to know about the money making dances that Bilko threw and other things. Elliott wants all of Bilko's tax records from that year. Bilko panics and has his men go to extreme lengths with tons of paperwork and the verification of party gifts. He convinces Paparelli that he went to Atlantic City, which he didn't. Bilko tricks Col. Hall into buying himself a loving cup. He has to throw a 1953 New Year's Eve Party for the entire platoon. Bilko winds up cleared by an exhausted Elliot and his team. Alan Hewitt as Mr. Drummond.
47	13	"Mink Incorporated"	Al De Caprio	Nat Hiken, Billy Friedberg & Tony Webster	December 11, 1956
Bilko loses $100 from the platoon treasury money that he borrowed. The men want to know what happened to the money. Turns out he lost it betting on a horse. After seeing something in the paper, Bilko decides to set up a mink farm to get the money back. He just needs to get the remaining $300 in the treasury from Doberman to buy some breeding mink. Somehow he talks the men into the idea and they buy two mink. Bilko asks Ritzik to make up some special food for the mink. Now all he has to do is get the mink to breed. Col. Hall brings Gen. Parker in to inspect the kitchen. Hall smells the mink food and gets Parker out of the kitchen. It's been a month and the mink have not bred. One of the mink looks sick. They can't bring a doctor in because they don't want anyone to know about the mink. Bilko has Doberman imitate the symptoms displayed by the mink to Captain Styles, MD. Bilko soon learns he's been conned and was sold non-breeding mink.
48	14	"Sergeant Bilko Presents Ed Sullivan"	Al De Caprio	Story by : Nat Hiken; Teleplay by : Nat Hiken, Billy Friedberg & Terry Ryan	December 18, 1956
Ed Sullivan announces that next week his show will feature their annual Army Talent Show. Back at Fort Baxter, the men are auditioning before Special Services Captain Anderson (Charles Cooper). Bilko sings one note and Anderson says thank you and leaves. In New York, Anderson gives Ed the list of the people he's picked from around the country. Ed wants to do a bit with an Army jeep and Anderson says he'll get the Motor Pool Sergeant from Fort Baxter. Bilko receives a telegram saying he's to appear on The Ed Sullivan Show. Bilko arrives at the rehearsals and immediately starts making changes. He thinks he's going to sing in a big musical number on the show. It's not long before Bilko has all of the production team ganging up on Ed Sullivan. Ed confronts Bilko and has him sent back to Fort Baxter. It's the night of the show and Ed announces that it's been changed from an Army show to a Navy one. Somehow Bilko gets on stage. Marlo Lewis as himself. Ray Bloch as himself.
49	15	"Bilko Gets Some Sleep"	Al De Caprio	Nat Hiken, Tony Webster & Billy Friedberg	December 25, 1956
Sgt. Joan Hogan tells Col. Hall that Bilko broke a date with her last night because his uncle died. Joan finds out from Sgt. Ritzik that Bilko was playing poker last night. Joan is mad at Bilko. That night, no one wants to play poker because they want to sleep. Bilko tries, but he can't fall asleep. Bilko's conscience tells him he can't sleep because he's always scheming ways to outsmart Hall. His conscience wants him to be an honest human being again. But then Bilko's Ego (Robert Webber) tells him to keep doing what he's been doing. Bilko tells the camp psychiatrist, Capt. Adams (Nelson Olmsted), that he's having trouble sleeping. Bilko goes into a long rant about all his other problems. Adams suggests he reform his ways. Everyone is surprised by the change in Bilko and thinks he's up to something. Now his men can't sleep because they're wondering what's going on. Bilko sees everyone going to talk to Capt. Adams. Everyone is relieved and happy when Bilko reverts his old ways.
50	16	"The Blue Blood of Bilko"	Al De Caprio	Nat Hiken, Billy Friedberg & Tony Webster	January 8, 1957
Biff Bentonhurst (Stephen Douglass) is going to marry Penny Wingate (Ann Flood). Biff is meeting Penny's parents, Holton and Ruma Wingate (Marjorie Gateson). The Wingate's are a Philadelphia blue blood family and they want to know about Biff's family. Penny and Biff work around telling them that Biff's father, Clifton J. Bentonhurst, is a sergeant in the Army. Clifton tells Bilko about his son marrying into a wealthy family. The Wingate's learn that Clifton is a Sergeant and refuse to invite him to the wedding. Clifton tells Bilko that he's not going to the wedding. Bilko goes to see the Wingates. With much fast double talk, Bilko gets them to insist on Clifton attending the wedding. A general comes by and exposes Bilko as a con man. But the general does find a way for Clifton to still attend the wedding.
51	17	"Love That Guardhouse"	Al De Caprio	Nat Hiken, Billy Friedberg, Arnie Rosen & Coleman Jacoby	January 15, 1957
Despite losing at poker to Bilko, Ritzik wants to keep playing. Bilko tells him to stop gambling because he's so bad at it. Mrs. Ritzik wakes Bilko up wondering where Rupert is. Bilko tells her he's not there. Bilko finds out that Ritzik went to Las Vegas. Bilko tries to cover for Ritzik so he doesn't get in trouble. Ritzik returns and says he won $1,750 in Las Vegas. Mrs. Ritzik asks Col. Hall to lock him in the guardhouse to keep him away from Bilko. Bilko goes to see Ritzik hoping to be able to play poker with him. The Guard House Lieutenant (Tom Poston) says Ritzik can have no visitors except his wife. Bilko tries a few things to get himself locked up. Hall tells him he's not getting in the guard house. Bilko does finally get arrested, but at the same time, Ritzik is released. Something Ritzik does causes Gen. Davis to arrest him. By the time Hall arrives at the guard house, Ritzik has lost his money to Bilko, Sgt. Grover and Sgt. Harry Berch (Frederick O'Neal). The men feel bad and give the money to Mrs. Ritzik. They later learn that Mrs. Ritzik went to Vegas.
52	18	"Sergeant Bilko Presents Bing Crosby"	Al De Caprio	Nat Hiken, Billy Friedberg, Aaron Ruben and Phil Sharp	January 22, 1957
Col. Hall tells Bilko there will be no more of his dances and no more use of the recreation hall. Bilko was hoping to raise money to replace the platoon treasury money he lost on a horse. Henshaw suggests that Bilko try and get a star to come to the camp. Bilko cons Bing Crosby's manager into having Bing drop by at Fort Baxter. Hall gives Bilko permission to stage a show and sell tickets. Bilko receives a telegram saying that Bing won't be able to visit after all. Bilko runs into Chester Obermeier, a clerk at the Western Union station, and he looks a lot like Bing. Bilko schemes to pass him off as the real thing. It's the night of the show and Bilko can't find Chester and he has to stall for time. Barbella and Henshaw finally find Chester. Everyone realizes it's not Bing and they want their money back. Just then the real Bing Crosby shows up.
53	19	"Bilko Goes to Monte Carlo"	Al De Caprio	Nat Hiken & Billy Friedberg	January 29, 1957
Bilko has been spending several nights staying up working on something. Everyone wonders what scheme he is working on to take their money. Emma Ritzik hides Rupert's money. Bilko tells his men that he's discovered a new gambling system to win at roulette. All the men give Bilko money and he winds up with over $5000. Bilko wants to go to Las Vegas but Col. Hall won't let him go. With the help of Air Force Sergeant Bill Henderson (Bern Hoffman), Bilko heads to Monte Carlo. Along the way, Bilko is given various aliases and more money. Bilko finally arrives in Monte Carlo. Once at the casino, Bilko has second thoughts about gambling the men's money. Somehow the Casino Manager (Marcel Hillaire) thinks Bilko lost all his money and is thinking about suicide. The Manager gives Bilko the amount of money he came in with and thinks Bilko is leaving. Bilko gambles away the money that the Manager gave him. Bilko finds another Manager and gets money from him. He loses all that money as well. The first Manager sees that Bilko is still there and kicks him out, but Bilko still has the men's money. Dan Frazer as Jet Pilot.
54	20	"Bilko Enters Politics"	Al De Caprio	Nat Hiken, Billy Friedberg, Arnie Rosen & Coleman Jacoby	February 5, 1957
Mayor Burke is running for re-election. Miss Gloria Formby (Margaret Hamilton) complains to Burke that some of the men from Fort Baxter whistled at her. Just then, Bilko comes in and Gloria says Bilko was one of the men. Burke refuses to build a servicemen center for the men at Fort Baxter. Bilko wants to throw a scare into Burke and run one of his men for mayor. Bilko picks Doberman and they start campaigning. Mr. Donnelly, the chairman of the party, comes to see Burke. Bilko and Doberman also come by. Donnelly agrees to build the servicemen center if Doberman drops out of the race. But then Bilko realizes that the newspapers and many people are in favor of Doberman. Donnelly panics and starts an aggressive campaign for Burke. Doberman's campaign really takes off. Bilko edits a tape Col. Hall made against Doberman and turns it into praise. Even the Mayor's wife endorses Doberman. At a rally, Doberman says he does not want to be mayor and endorses Burke. Donnelly tells Bilko he will build the center plus a pool if Bilko promises to stay out of politics.
55	21	"Bilko's Television Idea"	Al De Caprio	Nat Hiken & Billy Friedberg	February 12, 1957
Bilko and some of the men are watching Comedian Buddy Bickford's (Danny Dayton) TV show. Meanwhile, Mr. Bigby (Howard Petrie), the Advertising Agency Head, is disappointed with Bickford's ratings. Bigby wants to come up with a new format for the show. One of his assistants suggests an Army character for Bickford. Bilko learns that Bickford will spend a week at Fort Baxter. Bilko knows that Pvt. Art Whitley has been sending script ideas to TV stations. Marsh and Milnik, from the Agency, arrive at the camp. Bilko tries to sell them one of Whitley's show ideas. Bickford shows up and Bilko learns they're doing research for an Army comedy. Bilko tries to convince Bickford that the army comedy is old hat and he's found the perfect vehicle for him. Bickford starts to believe Bilko's idea is funny. In the end, Bickford thinks doing a show about an Army Sergeant that can talk anyone into anything would be funnier. Dagmar as Self. Note: At the time of this episode, Danny Dayton was married to Dagmar.
56	22	"The Son of Bilko"	Al De Caprio	Nat Hiken, Billy Friedberg, Arnie Rosen & Coleman Jacoby	February 26, 1957
Bilko, Henshaw and Barbella are in New York City. Henshaw and Barbella have dates, but Bilko can't get one. Bilko runs into old friend Harvey Metz (Joe Silver). Harvey recommends Bilko call Peggy La Salle (Collette Lyons), who Bilko once dated. Bilko goes to Peggy's place and meets her husband and her son Jeff. Jeff wants to join the Army. On the train home, Bilko tells Henshaw and Barbella that if he had gotten married back then, he could have had a son like Jeff. Bilko dreams he has a son who is intelligent and even becomes the president. 18-year-old Pvt. Perkins is assigned to Bilko's platoon and Bilko learns he has been transferred 14 times. Bilko wants to be a father figure to him. Perkins is a practical joker and his antics soon upset the whole platoon. Bilko sticks up for Perkins. While asleep, Perkins puts a wig and lipstick on Bilko. A General comes by and sees Bilko. The men want to get rid of him. Bilko wants to turn the tables on Perkins and attempts an elaborate practical joke. But Perkins gets the last laugh and tricks Bilko twice.
57	23	"Rock 'n' Roll Rookie"	Al De Caprio	Nat Hiken & Billy Friedberg	March 5, 1957
Rock star Elvin Pelvin (Tom Gilson) is drafted into the Army. Elvin is sent to various Army bases, but his fans keep showing up. At the Pentagon, Capt. Williams (Dan Frazer) suggests to the General that they send Elvin to some small isolated base. Williams picks Fort Baxter. Williams tells Col. Hall that because Elvin is also a good mechanic, he'll be put in Bilko's motor pool. Because he's a millionaire, Hall is worried about putting Elvin in with Bilko. The men are surprised and excited when Elvin enters the barracks. Bilko sees dollar signs. He arranges so Elvin doesn't get a standard GI haircut and uniform. Bilko is offered $10,000 for a new Elvin Pelvin recording. Bilko now has to record Elvin singing without him knowing it. Several attempts to record Elvin fail. They finally are able to record Elvin. He sings an original song about his friends in Bilko's platoon. Bilko is so moved that he destroys the recording.
58	24	"Bilko's Black Magic"	Al De Caprio	Nat Hiken, Tony Webster & Billy Friedberg	March 19, 1957
World War II veteran Pvt. Lester Mendelsohn (Gerald Hiken) is rescued from a Pacific island after being stranded there for over 10 years. The Army wants to ease him into normal life slowly and sends him to Fort Baxter. He assigned to Bilko's platoon. Bilko doesn't want him, until he learns Lester is due over $7,000 in back-pay. The Army Finance Captain (Dan Frazer) wants Lester to put the money in bonds, but Lester wants the cash. When Lester gets to the barracks, he tells Bilko he already lost all his money to Grover and Ritzik. Lester doesn't care about the money, he just wants friends. Bilko feels bad for him and plans to get the money back. Bilko tells Grover and Ritzik that Lester acquired voodoo powers and can put a curse on anyone who did him an injustice. The two start to panic and Grover spends the night at Ritzik's. They want to return the money to Lester. But Bilko wants to teach them a lesson. Bilko tells them there's a way to break the curse and gives them an embarrassing list of things to do. Bilko says that didn't work and there now must be a human sacrifice. Ritzik briefly considers his wife Emma. In the end, Lester gets his money back.
59	25	"Bilko Goes South"	Al De Caprio	Nat Hiken, Billy Friedberg & Lou Meltzer	March 26, 1957
The Midwest is in the midst of a cold wave. Bilko pretends to be sick so he could get a furlough to go to Florida. Capt. Hedges (Nelson Olmsted) is not falling for it and tells Bilko he's staying in camp. Bilko fantasizes about being in a commercial for sunny Arizona and he's dressed like a cowboy. He then daydreams about being in a commercial for Monte Carlo with a girl named Gina (Tina Louise). Henshaw and Barbella mention that the Army has a singing contest this time of year. They send the best platoon from each camp to Florida for the finals. Meanwhile at an Army Tropical Disease facility, they are studying mosquitoes that carry a fungus fever. Capt. Haybert and Capt. Billings ask General Owens to get some Army volunteers to see if it is fatal to humans. Bilko and his men think they are signing the applications for the singing contest, but it's really for the medical test. The platoon arrives in Miami and is treated like royalty. The next day, they are brought into a room where the mosquitoes will be released. Thinking they are auditioning, the men start singing and the Officers have a hard time letting the mosquitoes go. They finally release a couple and Bilko kills them. They release them all and learn that the fever has no effect on humans. Back at Fort Baxter, General Owens gives them a citation of valor. The men learn about the experiment.
60	26	"Bilko Goes Around the World"	Al De Caprio	Nat Hiken, Billy Friedberg & Tony Webster	April 2, 1957
The men went to see the movie Around the World in 80 Days. The men tell Doberman that he looks like David Niven. Bilko brings in USAF Sgt. Mack (Bob Hastings), who Bilko treated to dinner and a movie, to the base. Mack figures Bilko has a furlough coming up and he wants him to fly him somewhere. Bilko admits he has a woman in San Francisco he wants to hook up with. Mack can connect Bilko with several flights that would take him around the world. Bilko calls Movie producer Mike Todd and suggests a competition to promote 'Around The World In 80 Days'. The prize would be $20,000 to anyone who makes it in 80 hours. Todd likes the idea and runs with it. Meanwhile, Bilko is in a mad rush on the phone to plan all the connecting flights. At the airport there is much confusion and a boy named Sydney is mistakenly taken in Bilko's place. The Mother (Grace Matthews) has the police take Bilko away. Bilko tries to explain about the trip around the world. Sydney wins the competition. Bernard Fox as Agent in Trinidad. Dennis Patrick as Publicity for Mike Todd.
61	27	"The Mess Hall Mess"	Al De Caprio	Nat Hiken, Billy Friedberg & Terry Ryan	April 9, 1957
Sgt. Ritzik has been experimenting with different meals and no one likes them. Ritzik tells Bilko he's been doing this because there's a contest for the best original American recipe and a $50,000 prize. Bilko, Ritzik and Grover go to a French restaurant in town. They each have the casserole and it's great. Bilko wants to enter it in the contest. Chef Boudreaux won't give the secret recipe to Bilko. Bilko brings a sample to Lab Tech Charlie (Sandy Kenyon) to have it analyzed, but gets no results. Bilko pretends to save Boudreaux from Ritzik and Grover, who are dressed as robbers, but Boudreaux still won't reveal the recipe. Bilko finds a way to trick Boudreaux into giving him the recipe. But the so-called secret recipe was actually in the Army cookbook all along. Bilko helps Boudreaux make his restaurant one of the busiest in town. Nicholas Saunders as Captain Barker.
62	28	"The Secret Life of Sergeant Bilko"	Al De Caprio	Nat Hiken, Billy Friedberg & Tony Webster	April 16, 1957
Reporter Ray Barker (Philip Coolidge) claims to be exposing many security leaks in the Army. At the Pentagon, Gen. Horner calls Editor Harry Sims (Otto Hulett) and tells him to stop Barker from printing lies. Sims does tell Barker that he has to find real leaks and not make things up. Barker decides to go to Fort Baxter and bribe men to give away Army secrets. He finds a restaurant where Bilko and his men are. Papparelli recognizes Barker as the reporter writing phony stories about the Army. Bilko sees money to be made and will make up things to tell Barker. Bilko pretends to sneak Barker into their barracks. The men then proceed to scam Barker by showing him lots of supposed 'top-secret' documents. They take Barker for a lot of money. Sims calls Barker and tells him all the documents he sent were fake. Bilko overhears the call and proceeds to pull another scam. Barker know believes that Bilko and his men are conspiring to overthrow the government. He tells this to Col. Hall. Bilko tricks Barker into thinking Hall is in charge of their sabatoge plot. Bilko finds a way to get Sims arrested. In the end, they get Barker to write a flattering article about Fort Baxter. Henry Lascoe as Restaurant Owner Adamopolis.
63	29	"Radio Station B.I.L.K.O."	Al De Caprio	Nat Hiken, Billy Friedberg & Terry Ryan	April 23, 1957
Bilko, Henshaw and Barbella go to the local radio station. Mr. Nieman, the Manager, agrees to run a plug for Bilko's next dance. Nieman tells Bilko that the station is closing down tomorrow night. Bilko wants to start a radio station because there are still local sponsors. Bilko asks Grover to use the camp's radio room. Bilko, Henshaw and Barbella then sign up local businesses to advertise. Bilko and the men begin broadcasting various programs. Brig. General Cummings (Frank M. Thomas) comes to inspect the base. Bilko has to do some running around to hide the radio broadcasting from him. Barbella tells Bilko that the sponsors have cancelled everything. Bilko has one more program to run called 'John's Original Wife'. As Col. Hall will be out playing cards that evening, they will broadcast from his house. Hall and his wife unexpectedly return home. A microphone is left switched on and Hall and his wife arguing is being broadcast. Bilko learns from Barbella that all of Roseville are hooked on 'John's Original Wife'. The sponsor that paid for a spot on that show wants it to continue. Bilko finds a way to end the program.
64	30	"Bilko the Marriage Broker"	Al De Caprio	Nat Hiken, Billy Friedberg, Coleman Jacoby, Arnie Rosen & Terry Ryan	April 30, 1957
Lt. Tom Wallace (Biff McGuire) takes command of Company B. He's clearly way too efficient and strick for Bilko and his men. They hope to find a way to soften him up. Wallace has been there 3 weeks and nothing the men have tried has worked. Bilko thinks Wallace might ease up if he had a woman in his life. They try to set Wallace up with the camp librarian Gloria Wigman (Janet Fox). That didn't work. Beautiful WAC Lieutenant Virginia Rogers (Constance Ford) arrives at camp. Bilko introduces Virginia to Wallace and they get into a fight right away. What Bilko doesn't know is that the two are engaged. They faked the fight because no one can find out about them. Bilko wants waitress Cleo the Clutch to make a play for Wallace hoping to make Virginia jealous. Something happens and Cleo winds up flirting with Col. Hall instead. Wallace learns that some people know about the engagement. Wallace and Virginia decide to get married, but then another mistake breaks them up. Bilko finds a way to get them together. Jason Evers as Lieutenant.
65	31	"Bilko Acres"	Al De Caprio	Nat Hiken & Billy Friedberg	May 7, 1957
Col. Hall wants to find a place to store old records. He goes to an old gun shed. Bilko and his men are gambling in there and see Hall coming. They are able to hide things before Hall arrives. Bilko now has to find a new place to gamble. Hall accidentally keeps finding the places Bilko picks. Bilko thinks there's a spy among his men. Bilko tries to set a trap for the spy, but it just causes wild rumors to spread around the base. Everyone thinks they're being shipped out and the camp is being condemned. Bilko thinks the Army plans to expand Fort Baxter and buys the adjacent swampland with the Platoon Welfare Fund. Hall tells Bilko that the Army really plans to downsize the camp. Bilko tries to sell lots on the newly-named Paradise Acres. But then the people see what the land actually looks like. Realtor Burke returns after seeing the land and finds crude oil on his shoes. Burke calls Bilko with a really low offer for the land. Bilko finds oil on his shoes. Realtor Robinson (Stephen Chase) offers Bilko and the men several million dollars. Then they find out that Doberman sprayed oil over the land to kill mosquitoes.
66	32	"The Big Scandal"	Al De Caprio	Nat Hiken, Billy Friedberg & Tony Webster	May 14, 1957
Professor Horatio Hypnotist is performing at Fort Baxter and he has Sgt. Ritzik under his spell. Bilko claims he can't be hypnotized. Bilko does get hypnotized and confesses that he wrecked Col. Hall's staff car in a stock car race. Hall wants Bilko to fix the car at his expense. Later, Bilko reads a book about self taught hypnotism. To get some money, Bilko bets the men that he can hypnotize Ritzik. Bilko tries to make Ritzik believe he's in love with Hall's wife, Nell. It doesn't work and Bilko loses the bet. What no one knows is that Doberman was hypnotized. Nell is supposed to leave and visit friends for the weekend. Bilko hears on the phone a man professing his love for Nell. Bilko thinks Nell has another man and wants to find out who it is before things go too far. Major Spangler MD (Heywood Hale Broun) comes by to give Nell a vaccination. Bilko at first thinks he is the other man, but realizes he isn't. Bilko hopes that Stacked Suzie (Julie Newmar) can get Nell to see Hall can still attract a woman. Bilko finds out it was Doberman and gets him out of his trance.
67	33	"Bilko's Perfect Day"	Al De Caprio	Nat Hiken, Billy Friedberg & Terry Ryan	May 21, 1957
The fates have aligned and it's the one day in his life when nothing can go wrong for Sgt.Bilko. Bilko tells Barbella and Henshaw about all the bad luck he had the day before. Bilko doesn't notice, but little things are going right for him. He jokingly picks some horses to be winners. Fender (Herbie Faye) tells Bilko there's a civilian in Col. Hall's office who wants to see him. Bilko believes it's the man he got into an auto accident with yesterday. Mr. Forbes tells Hall that Bilko is the man. Bilko lies and says he was on the base at the time. Somehow Lt. Johnson (Bob Hastings) backs up Bilko's story. Patsy the Bookie (Paul Lipson) calls Bilko and tells him he wants the $100 that Bilko owes him by that night. Bilko learns that because of something he told Doberman, Doberman won $100. Because of Bilko, Ritzik finds a pearl in an oyster. Bilko finds out that Doberman lost the money in a card game. Bilko learns he had a chance to get a $10,000 reward for turning in a wanted criminal. He then finds out all the horses he picked actually won. Bilko realizes it was his lucky day. Bilko gets Patsy to place a bet for him on a horse race in Australia. The horse he picked is in the lead. But then it turns midnight and the horse loses. Parker Fennelly as Mr. MacGregor.
68	34	"The Colonel Breaks Par"	Al De Caprio	Sydney Zelinka, A.J. Russell, Nat Hiken & Billy Friedberg	May 28, 1957
Bilko tells Lt. Johnson that Col. Hall will be going on a fifteen-day vacation. Hall is to leave that night. Bilko starts to plan for dances and gambling events. That night, Hall and his wife Nell are set to go to the movies. They changed their plans and will vacation during the winter. Bilko doesn't know this and starts the festivities the next morning. Suddenly Hall walks in and wants to know what's going on. Bilko finds out about the change in Hall's vacation plans. Because Bilko's plans are in motion and money was invested, he has to find a way to get Hall off the base. Bilko wants to talk Hall into entering an Army golfing tournament. The only problem is that the Colonel is a terrible golfer. Bilko knows champion golfer Sam Snead and calls him up. Sam agrees to help. On the golf course, Hall doesn't recognize Sam, who pretends to be a lousy golfer. Bilko pretends to give Sam some tips. Bilko convinces Hall that he can help him play better. With much manipulation, Hall has his best game ever and decides to go to the tournament. Bilko feels guilty and does not want Hall to make a fool of himself. Bilko is surprised when Hall actually becomes a better player.
69	35	"Show Segments"	Al De Caprio	Nat Hiken & Billy Friedberg	June 4, 1957
Ed Sullivan meets with Phil Silvers, Harvey Lembeck and Allan Melvin at Lindy's restaurant in New York. They talk about, and the viewer gets to see, scenes edited out of previous shows. Nat Hiken felt these outtakes were too good to end up on the cutting room floor and compiled them into what is possibly television's first 'clip show'.
70	36	"His Highness Doberman"	Al De Caprio	A.J. Russell, Sydney Zelinka & Billy Friedberg	June 11, 1957
The men can't work on a jeep until Doberman returns from town with a carburetor. But he returns in a daze. Later, Doberman is all clean and polished. Because he has much money, the men decide to follow Doberman. They find Doberman with a woman in an ice cream parlor. They believe he is in love and want to help him. Duane and the woman drive off in a fancy car. Bilko finds out from the Ice Cream Parlor Assistant (Bruce Kirby) that the woman is Lillian Middleton (Martha Greenhouse). Her father is president of Consolidated Iron and Steel. Lillian brings Doberman home to meet her parents, John and Olivia Middleton (Philippa Bevans). When Olivia sees that Duane is a soldier, she throws him out of the house. Thinking Doberman is going to be rich, the men all want something from him. Doberman tells the men what happened and Bilko brings his spirits up. Bilko convinces John and Olivia that Duane is a Crown Prince. Olivia calls Captain J. Barker (Nicholas Saunders) about Doberman. Bilko gets Barker to think that Duane is royalty. Bilko then gets the Middleton's to throw a big party for Doberman. It's the night of the party and Doberman is dancing with Lillian. Barker learns from the Pentagon that Doberman is just a plain soldier. He goes to the party and Lillian tells Barker she knows the truth about Duane. He lets the charade continue.

=== Season 3 (1957–58) ===
No. overall	No. in season	Title	Directed by	Written by	Original release date
71	1	"Bilko's Merry Widow"	Al De Caprio	Nat Hiken & Billy Friedberg	September 17, 1957
Bilko puts on a production of The Merry Widow for Roseville, Kansas.
72	2	"Bilko's Boy's Town"	Al De Caprio	Phil Sharp & Terry Ryan	September 24, 1957
Col. Hall is talking to his senior officers about the upcoming desert maneuvers. Hall tells his Medical Officer (Nelson Olmsted) to not let Bilko come up with an excuse not to go. Bilko and his men actually want to go because they'll be just miles from Las Vegas. Hall wonders why when Bilko says he's looking forward to the maneuvers. That night Hall figures out that it's because of Las Vegas. Hall orders Bilko and his men to stay at Fort Baxter for the two weeks. Something Fender says gives Bilko the idea to turn Fort Baxter into a summer camp for boys. With the fees set at $125 a kid, he hopes to rake in the money. The men manage to recruit quite a few boys. Bilko intercepts a letter from Roger Warren (Darryl Richard) to his mother saying the camp stinks. Bilko learns that maneuvers were cut short and Hall will soon return. The men have to bring the boys home and refund half the money. Turns out Roger's parents won't be home until the next day, so Bilko has to hide him at camp. Hall discovers the boy and Bilko tries to pass him off as his nephew. Hall says he and his wife will watch the boy. Things get confusing when Roger's parents show up and Hall learns about the boys camp. Roger invents a story that gets Bilko out of trouble. But in the process, Bilko has to give Roger all the money they collected for the camp. Godfrey Cambridge as Private Tow. Jason Evers as Capt. Kyler. Nicholas Saunders as Capt. Barker.
73	3	"Hillbilly Whiz"	Al De Caprio	Coleman Jacoby & Arnie Rosen	October 1, 1957
Bilko's Company B platoon loses at baseball to the WAC typists 24-0. What's worse is that Bilko has a $50 bet with Ritzik and Grover that Company B will beat Company A next week. The next day, Bilko and his men are on the rifle range. Barbella brings new recruit Private Harry Lumpkin (Dick Van Dyke) over. Lumpkin can hit the targets with a rock. He's from the South and they would hunt squirrels that way. Bilko decides to use Lumpkin as their pitcher. Bilko gets Ritzik and Grover to raise their bet to $300. Bilko would also like to make money by getting Lumpkin to sign with the Yankees. Bilko panics when Lumpkin sprains his left throwing hand. Lumpkin claims he can pitch just as well with his right hand. Bilko's team wins. It turns out that Lumpkin can hit as well. Bilko gets a Yankee Scout (Frank Campanella) to come to Fort Baxter. Bilko and Lumpkin are going to New York. Lumpkin's girlfriend Lulabell will meet them there. Lumpkin hears he'll be trying out for the Yankees. As a Southern boy, he couldn't play for that team. Bilko talks him into going. Bilko gets some of the Yankees to pretend they're from the South and Lumpkin signs the contract. Because of Lulabell, Lumpkin winds up playing for another team and Bilko is out any money. Guest Stars: Phil Rizzuto, Yogi Berra, Gil McDougald, Whitey Ford and Red Barber.
74	4	"Bilko's Valentine"	Al De Caprio	Phil Sharp & Terry Ryan	October 8, 1957
The other WACs ask Joan (Elisabeth Fraser) what kind of Valentine's gift she got from Bilko. Once again, he forgot to get her something. Joan tells the girls the only thing she got was re-enlistment papers. She'll sign the papers, but she'll let Bilko think she didn't. Bilko finds out it's Valentine's day and he hears Joan is leaving the Army. Bilko believes that she is bluffing. When Joan learns that Bilko doesn't think she'll leave, she actually boards a train and goes. Bilko pretends he doesn't care. When he calls Joan, she hangs up on him. Bilko goes to see Capt. Witherspoon at the WAC recruiting office. He talks her into sending him to Sumter, Georgia where Joan is with her mother (Nydia Westman). Bilko has a small recruiting gathering in front of the mother's house, but Joan won't talk to him. He tries a radio broadcast to get Joan's attention. Bilko goes to her house again and Joan slams the door in his face. Mother tells Joan she should re-enlist and be stationed somewhere like Paris or Rome. Joan dreams she is in Paris and meets someone who looks like Bilko. The same thing happens in Rome and then London. Joan re-enlists at Fort Baxter and Bilko almost ruins things again. Billie Allen as WAC Billie.
75	5	"The Big Man Hunt"	Al De Caprio	Phil Sharp & Terry Ryan	October 15, 1957
In Kimberley, South Africa, Red Thompson (Robert Gist) has discovered a diamond mine. Apparently, Bilko saved Red's life in World War II and Red wants to give him half of everything he has. Red will hire some private detectives to find Bilko. Meanwhile, Bilko is trying to raise $100 to enter the Poker Olympics in Topeka. Bilko has won the Olympic cup two years in a row. One more win and he could keep the cup permanently. Bilko goes to the Bank President (Otto Hulett) and manages to get the money. Despite General Hollander coming for an inspection, Bilko gets a pass to leave. When two detectives come looking for Bilko, he pretends to not know who Bilko is. The detectives eventually figure out who Bilko is, but he manages to get them to leave him alone. Bilko reads about Red in the paper and heads to New York. At the hotel, there's a long line of men who claim to have saved Red's life. Bilko finally sees Red and Red doesn't recognize him at first. Red gives Bilko a blank check to fill out. Red is then told that the land where he found the diamonds is owned by the Kimberley Mining Company. Red is broke. Bert Freed as 2nd Detective.
76	6	"Bilko's Double Life"	Al De Caprio	A.J. Russell and Sydney Zelinka	October 22, 1957
Bilko owes just about everyone in town money. Bilko is going on furlough to New York and the men sneak him out of camp. Meanwhile, millionaire Herbert Penfield III has been a nervous wreck lately. His doctor thinks Herbert should go to a quiet little town where no one knows him. Martin (Leonard Elliott), Herbert's Manservant, suggests the town where his father was born, Roseville, Kansas. In New York, Bilko is mistaken for Herbert and given a suite in the hotel. Herbert and Martin arrive in Roseville and Herbert wonders why everyone is treating him so badly. He doesn't know they think he's Bilko. Herbert winds up paying some of the people the money that Bilko owes them. Bilko learns that he is mistaken for Herbert, but doesn't know he's a millionaire. Helen Penfield (Eileen Letchworth), Herbert's sister, comes by. She wants him to attend a family meeting and stand up to Uncle Randolph. Bilko helps the Penfield family and Herbert makes things right with Joan and others. Bilko and Herbert run into each other at the train station. John C. Becher as Hotel Manager. Heywood Hale Broun as Haskins - Hotel Asst. Manager. Ann Flood as Lucille the Girlfriend. Paul Lipson as Patsy the Bookie. Henry Lascoe as Adamapolis the Restaurateur.
77	7	"Sergeant Bilko Presents"	Al De Caprio	Phil Sharp & Terry Ryan	October 29, 1957
New recruit Pvt. Hugo Lockman gives the men tickets to a play he wrote. Bilko was going to have a dance the same night. He asks Lockman what he's making on the play and he says nothing. Bilko then schemes to make money off the play. At the dress rehearsal, Bilko sees that the actors are all children. Bilko wants to take the play to Broadway with real actors. He hopes to raise money from the Roseville Woman's Club, but he finds they have none. He tries the bank, but has no luck. Bilko talks to Major Lukens (Edward Andrews), the Special Services Officer. He talks Lukens into starting an Army play writing contest. Lockman wants to rewrite the third act, but he can't come up with anything. It doesn't help that Bilko is rushing him as there's a deadline to mail the play in. Lockman finally finishes the play. Major Lukens tells the men that a winner was picked and the play will be produced on Broadway. It wasn't Lockman. Apparently, when Doberman mailed the play in, he didn't put stamps on it. Darryl Richard as Big Poppa. Karin Wolfe as Blanche. Philippa Bevans as The Chairwoman.
78	8	"Papa Bilko"	Al De Caprio	Sydney Zelinka & A.J. Russell	November 5, 1957
It's 1944 and Bilko is stationed in France during World War II. He befriends a woman, her mother and the woman's daughter, Mignon. Mignon calls him Papa Bilko. Back to the present in Roseville. Bilko and some of the men are trying to get dates. Apparently all the women are waiting for a date with Pvt. Pearly Johnson (Robert Webber). Pearly is part of Grover's platoon. Bilko would like to get him to transfer to his platoon. Grover loses big at poker and lets Pearly go to Bilko. Pearly gives Bilko and his men tips on how to act with women. A grown up Mignon arrives and asks Joan where Papa Bilko is. An upset Joan calls Bilko and tells him his daughter is here. Bilko comes by and it takes him a little while to recognize Mignon. He then explains to Joan that "Papa" is a term of endearment. Bilko leads his men to believe that Mignon is a little girl, but then they see her and go wild. Mignon meets Pearly and goes on a date with him. Bilko is worried because Pearly is such a womanizer. Bilko asks Captain Barker to transfer Pearly to Alaska, but Barker refuses. Bilko tries another way to get rid of Pearly, but that doesn't work. Pearly and Mignon get married. Dody Goodman as Waitress.
79	9	"Bilko Talks in His Sleep"	Al De Caprio	Phil Sharp & Terry Ryan	November 19, 1957
Bilko, Henshaw and Barbella are at a bar and grill and don't have enough money for the three to eat. Grover and Ritzik come by and show them the large amount of money they have. They tell Bilko that they're not going to bet with him anymore. Grover asks waitress Gladys for a date and she says she'll let him know. Bilko then asks Gladys for a date and tells her he'll take her to a fancy restaurant. She says yes. He now has to scam his men to get the money. Bilko starts talking in his sleep & unknowingly gives away the secret of his scam to Grover and Ritzik. They win the money. That night, Grover and Ritzik learn another gambling secret from a sleeping Bilko. They take Bilko for more money. Because of something Doberman says, Bilko realizes he's been talking in his sleep. He decides to turn the tables on Grover and Ritzik. The next night, Bilko pretends to be asleep and gives the two wrong information about their next bet. Bilko also leads them to believe he only has three months live and he's leaving all his possessions to them. Bilko's plan backfires when Grover and Ritzik spend all their money to bring in Doctor Gracey, a specialist, to save Bilko.
80	10	"Cherokee Ernie"	Al De Caprio	Arnie Rosen, Coleman Jacoby, Phil Sharp & Terry Ryan	November 26, 1957
The men are excited for their 2 week furlough. They also look forward to their share of the welfare fund. Bilko finally has to admit that he lost the money on a horse. The men now don't have the money to go anywhere. Pvt. Charlie White Eagle (Ira Lewis) tells Bilko he's going to a place where there are plenty of poker games. Bilko decides to go with Charlie and promises his men he'll win enough money to give to them. On the train, Charlie tells Bilko they'll be staying with his family and his sister Shanatooma. Bilko dreams he's Running Fox and beautiful Shanatooma loves him. After they arrive, Bilko meets the family and Shanatooma, who turns out to be a little girl. Charlie and Bilko learn that a river that supplies their water has been damned up. Bilko is inducted into the Cherokee Indian tribe and discovers a document that indicates that Oklahoma belongs to the Indians. Bilko calls himself Bald Eagle. They go to see J.J. Clarkton at the Bureau of Indian Affairs. Bilko then goes to see Clint (David White) and some other oil tycoons. Bilko finally receives a financial offer for the Cherokees that he finds acceptable. It is learned that the document proves the Cherokees signed the land over and the offer is taken back. Bilko does obtain money so they could buy the land around the river and remove the damn. Percy Verwayen as The Grandfather.
81	11	"Bilko Buys a Club"	Al De Caprio	Phil Sharp & Terry Ryan	December 3, 1957
Bilko and some of the men go to see Realtor Crowe. Bilko wants to set up a nightclub. To get the land he wants, Bilko has to come up with $750. He learns that some National Guard soldiers have been assigned to Fort Baxter. Bilko hopes to get some money from them, but he is not having much luck. He finds out that one of the men is involved in a multi-million dollar deal. Bilko needs to find out which recruit it is. Pvt. Sam Baker (Peter Turgeon) tells Pvt. Franklin DeWitt (Edward Andrews) about the railroad bond issue his office was working on. Papparelli misunderstands the conversation and thinks DeWitt is the rich guy. The guys treat DeWitt like a king. Crowe tells Bilko that he's too late and someone has already put an option on the land. At the Pentagon, a General tells the other officers that they have purchased the land by Fort Baxter to test radio activated land mines. Bilko and the men take DeWitt to an abandoned building on the land telling him they want to make it a home for old soldiers. Bilko thinks he has it made when DeWitt says he'll contribute some money. A plane detonates the mine and the building blows up. DeWitt gives Bilko a check for $20 and tells him he's just a butcher. Bilko finds out that Baker is the rich guy and he gave a check for $20,000 to build an old soldiers home. Clifton James as National Guard Sergeant.
82	12	"Lieutenant Bilko"	Al De Caprio	Sydney Zelinka & A.J. Russell	December 10, 1957
A happy Col. Hall tells his wife Nell that tomorrow Bilko's stint in the Army is up and he's leaving. The platoon begs Bilko to stay. A General learns that during World War II Bilko was temporarily promoted to lieutenant. But somehow the temporary commission was never canceled. Bilko needs to sign a form to officially terminate the promotion. Bilko learns what happened and wants to collect his back pay. But he won't receive it if he leaves the Army, so he re-enlists. At what was supposed to be the going away party, Hall comes to say goodbye to Bilko. Hall finds out about Bilko's lieutenant status and that Bilko refuses to sign the termination form. Hall has WAC Edna try to contact the Pentagon. General Williams tells Hall he needs a man for a dangerous mission. After meeting Lieutenant Bilko, Williams thinks he could be the man. When Bilko hears about the mission, he at first wants to sign the termination form. But then he decides to go through with it. Bilko is relieved when the mission is cancelled. Hall learns that if Bilko stays a lieutenant, he would actually owe $6000. Bilko signs the form.
83	13	"Bilko at Bay"	Al De Caprio	A.J. Russell, Sydney Zelinka & Terry Ryan	December 17, 1957
Bilko, Henshaw and Barbella are going on furlough to New York City, but they have little money. Bilko comes up with a plan to visit some of the men's mothers along the way and get free meals. At every stop, Bilko exaggerates how great and well liked their sons are at camp. Despite being out of the way, their next stop will be Mrs. Doberman's (Dulcie Cooper) house. Mrs. Doberman runs a boarding house and two of her guests are Wilson (Henry Lascoe) and Finch (Philip Coolidge). They are bank robbers who are hiding out as fishermen until their leader Louie (Frank Campanella) shows up. Bilko, Henshaw and Barbella arrive and Finch is worried they'll figure things out. Finch is glad when they leave. But they return when their car breaks down. Bilko figures out Wilson and Finch are the missing robbers. Bilko, Henshaw and Barbella are now being held captive. Because of a little boy (Flip Mark) next door, Wilson finds out that Bilko was trying to send a note. Police Officer Billy Stevens (Frank Marth) comes by asking about the broken down car. Bilko tries to get Stevens to take him away, but Mrs. Doberman ruins it. Louie arrives disguised as a State trooper and Bilko thinks he saved. When he realizes who Louie is, Bilko pretends that he, Henshaw and Barbella are crooks as well. A radio announcement states that police know the crooks are in the area. Louie and his gang switch clothes with Bilko. The plan doesn't work and Officers arrest Louie and his gang. It turns out Mrs. Doberman knew they were crooks and was just waiting for Louie to show up. Clifton James as State Trooper.
84	14	"Bilko F.O.B. Detroit"	Al De Caprio	Sydney Zelinka & A.J. Russell	December 24, 1957
Col. Hall is reluctantly sending Bilko and his men to Detroit to pick up a load of trucks. Hall wants him back in two days. Bilko packs for a much longer stay. At the Bellman Motor Company in Detroit, Roger K. Bellman is upset that his son, Roger K. Bellman, Jr. (William Hickey) is being inducted into the Army only as a Private. Bilko complains about the quality of the trucks as an excuse to have to stay longer. Bellman thinks Bilko is just wasting taxpayer money and will not pay for hotels and meals. Bellman, Jr. suggests the men sleep and eat in the factory. After stroking Bellman's ego, Bilko talks him into buying a Basic Training Kit that would allow GI's to train at home. This would save the government millions of dollars. Bilko and his men will move into Bellman's lavish home to test the kit on Bellman and his son. While the Bellman's are training, Bilko and his men are lounging poolside with bathing beauties. Hall calls Bilko and says if he's not back in a day, he will send the military police. Bilko learns that Bellman hopes to mass produce the kits and sell them to the Army. Bilko tries various ways to recover the rights to the kit. General Worthington comes by to talk to Bellman. Bellman finds out that Bilko tried to sell his kit to Worthington, who thought it was stupid and turned Bilko down. Hall can't believe it when Bilko and his men return to Fort Baxter without the trucks.
85	15	"Bilko and the Flying Saucers"	Al De Caprio	Coleman Jacoby & Arnie Rosen	December 31, 1957
At a Washington D.C. nightclub, singer Bonnie Morgan (Constance Ford) is talking to a Sergeant (Dan Frazer) and the name Bilko comes up. Bonnie knew Bilko from years ago. Bonnie flashes back to when she and Bilko were in New Guinea during the war. She was in the USO. Bonnie calls Bilko at Fort Baxter and asks if he could come to D.C. to see her. In his mind, Bilko remembers Bonnie not wanting him to be shipped out from New Guinea and that she loved him. Bilko learns that if anyone sees a UFO they have to bring the evidence to the Pentagon. That's his ticket to D.C. Knowing that he's into science fiction comic books, Bilko goes to see Ritzik. Bilko tells Ritzik he saw a flying saucer. To get Ritzik to verify his story, Bilko has him search the skies the next night. Bilko, Henshaw and Barbella stage some fake lights and sounds and Ritzik and Grover believe they saw the UFOs. Major Charles Lukens doesn't believe it. Bilko will give Lukens the same treatment and includes Doberman dressed as an alien. Lukens sees everything and tells Bilko he filed a report. Lukens tells Bilko he doesn't have to go to the Petagon, because an Army Inspector is coming to camp. Bilko and Ritzik wind up being locked up for observation.
86	16	"Bilko and the Colonel's Secretary"	Al De Caprio	Sydney Zelinka, A.J. Russell, Phil Sharp & Terry Ryan	January 7, 1958
Col. Hall's secretary Silvia has been transferred and the other WACs wonder when he'll get another one. When Bilko finds out, he wants to pick the new one. Bilko tricks WAC Edna into picking WAC Cpl. Blanche Ripley. Meanwhile at Camp Miller, Blanche is with her boyfriend, Sgt. Bill Harrison. Blanche is devastated when she learns she's been transferred to Fort Baxter. Bilko gives Blanche some presents when she arrives hoping to get on her good side. When she discovers it was Bilko who arranged the transfer, she assigns his platoon to garbage duty. Blanche then continues to give the platoon the worst assignments. Bilko learns about her boyfriend. Bilko tries to make Blanche believe that the men have paint poisoning and need some time off. She discovers that he is making it up and gives the men another lousy job. Doberman tells Bilko about a Miss Roseville contest and the winner will get a trip to Switzerland. Bilko takes some elaborate measures to cause the three finalists to drop out of the contest. Blanche wins but she thinks it's all a fake stunt by Bilko. Bilko gets Hall to think Blanche is in love with him and Hall transfers her back to Camp Miller. Bilko's plan backfires when Sgt. Bill Harrison is transferred to Fort Baxter as Hall's new secretary. He's not happy to know it was Bilko who had Blanche transferred. Suzanne Storrs as Lucille Lyons. Mara McAfee as Barbara Ritter. Grace Carney as Mother Lyons. John Cecil Holm as Father Lyons.
87	17	"Doberman the Crooner"	Al De Caprio	Phil Sharp, Terry Ryan & Vincent Bogert	January 14, 1958
The men and the WACs are listening to a record of a male crooner who is very good. Bilko learns that the recording was made locally. Bilko thinks the singer could make it big and he wants to manage the person. The problem is they have to find out who it is. What they don't know is that Doberman is the singer. For a brief moment Bilko thinks the singer is Col. Hall, but it isn't. Then they think it might be Zimmerman (Mickey Freeman) and then Papparelli and then Grover. Bilko finally realizes it is Doberman. Bilko gets Doberman a spot on a local amateur hour TV show. Bilko learns from Doberman that he only sings well when he has a cold. His cold is gone and his singing voice is horrible. Bilko figures they'll just make a record whenever Doberman gets a cold. Bilko goes to Record Producer Buckley who agrees to make a recording of Doberman. Bilko learns that Captain Masters (Nelson Olmsted) is giving volunteers a cold virus hoping to develop a vaccine. Doberman is given the virus and develops a cold. But in the process, he loses his voice. Captain Masters tells Bilko that Doberman responded to the vaccine and may never catch a cold again.
88	18	"Bilko Presents Kay Kendall"	Al De Caprio	Neil Simon & Terry Ryan	January 21, 1958
Bilko talks Kay Kendall into performing for his men.
89	19	"Bilko's Cousin"	Al De Caprio	Phil Sharp & Terry Ryan	January 28, 1958
In Valley Falls, Uncle Fred and Aunt Julia Bilko are about to see off their son, Pvt. Swiftington 'Swifty' Bilko (Dick Van Dyke). He is being sent to Fort Baxter where his cousin Ernie Bilko is. Swifty is apparently not too bright. Bilko receives a telegram about Swifty's arrival and he looks forward to another Bilko at camp. He now envisions all the schemes he can pull off with Swifty helping him. Lieutenant Wilson (Bob Hastings) gives Col. Hall the list of new recruits. Hall is worried when he sees the name Bilko. When the men hear another Bilko is coming, they all hide their money. Bilko gets Swifty into a poker game. Swifty has no idea what he is doing but wins anyway. Bilko thinks Swifty bluffed his way into winning. Soon, Bilko realizes that Swifty knows nothing about the game. The men discover what a rube Swifty is and they start to take advantage of him. Bilko hopes to run a scam to make Swifty an officer so the enlisted men cannot fleece him anymore. Hall is impressed with Swifty and tells General Adcock about him. But then Hall discovers what a rube Swifty really is and worries what the General will think. Hall transfers Swifty to a weather observation station where he'll be by himself. Later, Swifty's brother Clem arrives at camp and he is quite the card shark.
90	20	"Bilko's Pigeons"	Al De Caprio	Phil Sharp & Terry Ryan	February 4, 1958
Lt. Anderson (Bob Hastings) gives Col. Hall a memo from the Pentagon stating that all base carrier pigeons must be removed. Hall says that Bilko has been looking after the birds. Hall was happy that Bilko was taking care of them and hoped it would change his character. What Hall doesn't know is that Bilko has been using the birds as racing birds and the men were gambling on them. Bilko hopes to raise enough money to buy a Jaguar automobile. Barbella tells him that the pigeon training and breeding is to be terminated. At first Hall wanted to try to let Bilko keep the birds as pets, but then he learns what Bilko really did with them. Bilko goes to see Zoo Director Huggins (Ralph Dunn) wanting to donate the birds to the zoo. Bilko finds out the birds are worth $200 and decides he'll try to sell them. Bilko does find someone to sell them to, young Georgie Baker Collingsworth III. He still needs more money to buy the car. The birds return and Bilko has to get rid of them before Hall finds out. He sells them to Grover knowing that they'll fly back. He'll then return them to Georgie. The birds come back. Bilko just needs a little more money and sells them to Ritzik. Grover figures out the scam Bilko has been running and will teach him a lesson. He leads Bilko to believe that Ritzik cooked the pigeons and Bilko will owe Georgie $200. Grover gets a friend to sell Bilko what he'll think are different pigeons that he'll be able to give to Georgie. When Bilko gives the birds to Georgie, he learns they are the originals and he was scammed. Grover and Ritzik buy the Jaguar.
91	21	"Cyrano de Bilko"	Al De Caprio	Phil Sharp & Terry Ryan	February 14, 1958
Bilko has set up another one of his dances. The band leaves because Bilko won't pay them cash in advance. Bilko has everyone dance to music from a radio. Pvt. Harold Westrum would like to meet a girl at the dance and asks Bilko's advice. Just as he's about to talk to her, another man asks her to dance. The next day Harold talks to Bilko about the girl, Natalie Rumplemeyer (Lee Meriwether). Bilko calls her up pretending to be Harold and sets up a date. Harold tells Bilko that the date didn't go well. Bilko then writes Natalie a letter as Harold and she finds it quite charming. She writes him a letter back. Harold tells Bilko that he's engaged and he's going to buy her a ring. Bilko wants to look into this Natalie to make sure she's not a gold digger. Bilko goes to see Natalie and meets her Aunt Natalie (Kay Medford). He thinks that she is Harold's Natalie. To find out more about her, Bilko takes Aunt Natalie out several times. He spends much money on her and notices she never mentions Harold. Bilko proposes to Aunt Natalie. He then learns about young Natalie. Bilko goes to tell Aunt Natalie about the mistake and she has thrown an engagement party. He can't bring himself to say anything. Bilko finds a way to get Aunt Natalie and Police Chief Ericson together. Tim Herbert as Roger the Musician.
92	22	"The Colonel's Reunion"	Al De Caprio	Coleman Jacoby & Arnie Rosen	February 21, 1958
Retired Gen. Bertram Whitney (Howard St. John) is speaking with his wife Cornelia about a reunion he will be hosting. Meanwhile, Col. Hall is talking to his officers about Operation Moonbeam. Hall wants to stop all of Bilko's gambling activities. Captain Barker and a couple MP's confiscate much of Bilko's gambling equipment. This goes on for several days. No matter where Bilko and the men try to covertly gamble, they are found. Bilko finds out about the reunion. With Hall off the base, gambling can resume. Bilko learns that Hall wasn't invited but finds a way to get him an invitation. Apparently, Whitney remembers Hall and calls him "Old Melon Head". Bilko's plan falls through when Hall tells him he and Papparelli are going with to the reunion in Chicago. At Whitney Manor, Bilko and Papparelli overhear Bertram and Cornelia ridiculing the Hall's. Bilko, posing as a special agent, gets Whitney to believe John Hall is a genius in charge of a secret space mission. Bilko then poses as a French fashion designer and gets Cornelia to believe that Nell Hall has excellent fashion sense. The Hall's are surprised by the reception they receive. Bertram offers Hall a high paying job at one of his companies. Bilko finds a way to keep Hall at Fort Baxter. George Kennedy as MP Sgt. Kennedy.
93	23	"Bilko Saves Ritzik's Marriage"	Al De Caprio	Arnie Rosen & Coleman Jacoby	February 28, 1958
Ritzik tells Bilko and the men that it's his 15th Wedding Anniversary. He bought flowers and candy for Emma. Bilko asks him to play a little poker but Ritzik says he has to be home by 8pm. Ritzik winds up playing cards all night. Bilko and the men try to trick a sleeping Emma into thinking Ritzik is only an hour late. She discovers it's the next morning. Emma says she's fed up and is leaving Ritzik. Ritzik doesn't seem to mind. Bilko feels bad and wants to reunite them. Bilko finds a way to have Ritzik see pictures of Emma everywhere. He wants to get her back. Ritzik goes to the movie house where she's working, but she doesn't want to talk to him. Bilko then tries to make Emma jealous by saying Ritzik is seeing another woman. His plan backfires when Emma gives Ritzik a subpoena for a divorce. Bilko poses as Ritzik when he sees the Judge (Walter Greaza). Barbella and Henshaw pose as Ritzik's college aged sons. The Judge agrees to help. Emma and Ritzik are polite to each other and it's a strain. Bilko gets them to yell at each other and they're happy again. Frank de Kova as Judge's Assistant.
94	24	"Bilko, the Art Lover"	Al De Caprio	Phil Sharp & Terry Ryan	March 7, 1958
Bilko wants the grease pits in the motor pool cleaned out. He then barks orders at his men. They can tell something's wrong. Captain Masters, MD thinks Bilko needs a break and gives him a two-week furlough. As usual, Bilko has no money and the men won't give him any. Bilko goes through his books to see who owes him money. Bilko finds old Army buddy Carlyle Thompson III (Alan Alda in his television debut). Carlyle was supposedly to come into millions when he reached 25, which Bilko figures he must be by now. Bilko calls Carlyle, who invites Bilko to his house in New York. Meanwhile, Carlyle's father is upset with him because he aspires to be a Bohemian sculptor. Carlyle II wants his son to go into his shipping business. It turns out he won't turn 25 for another seven months. Bilko arrives. Carlyle has a disagreement with his father and leaves, taking Bilko with him. They wind up at a cheap apartment and Bilko learns that Carlyle is penniless. Bilko tries several ways to sell Carlyle's artwork with no luck. Bilko finds a way to get one of Carlyle's sculptures in a new building his father put up. Bilko brings Carlyle and his father back together. Henry Lascoe as The Landlord. Eddie Lawrence as Felix Standish.
95	25	"Bilko, the Genius"	Al De Caprio	Arnie Rosen, Coleman Jacoby, Phil Sharp & Terry Ryan	March 14, 1958
Buzzy Groggin (Alfred Sandor), who ran the Motor Pool before Bilko, comes by. Bilko thinks Buzzy isn't doing well. Buzzy says he owns 300 cabs and is doing great. He tells Bilko he got where he is because of some classes he took in the Army. Bilko goes to a class and takes an aptitude test. Bilko doesn't know any of the answers. Captain Barker sends the papers to Washington. Bilko is mistakenly declared a genius. He is transferred to Camp Greenville, a special camp of intellectuals. Major Donnigan introduces Bilko to the men he is to supervise. Bilko intercepts a call that says there was a mistake and he is not a genius. He will be transferred back to Fort Baxter. Bilko asks GI Mathematician Wilkins if he could figure out the winner of a horse race. Bilko wants to call Patsy the Bookie, but learns there's no outside calls from the camp. Cpl. Electrical Engineer Engel (David Sheiner) rewires a radio transmitter for Bilko. Bilko gets ahold of Patsy, but won't make the bet without the money in his hand. GI Engineer Walter Maxwell (Mason Adams) builds a rocket for Bilko to send the money to Barbella. Despite attempts to shoot it down, the rocket reaches Fort Baxter. All the horses that Bilko bet on won and he stands to gain $350,000. Barbella tells Bilko that they couldn't process the bets because the MP's and the FBI traced the rocket. Frank Campanella as Second Lieutenant. Graham Jarvis as GI Meteorologist Galileo Barton.
96	26	"Bilko the Male Model"	Al De Caprio	Arnie Rosen & Coleman Jacoby	March 21, 1958
The men are looking at a picture in Life magazine that happens to have Bilko in the background. Bilko was supposed to be at Fort Riley, but he was actually in Chicago. Bilko returns to camp and finds out about the picture. Bilko finds a way to prevent Col. Hall from seeing it. Meanwhile at a New York advertising agency, Executive Larkin (David White) is talking about the Life magazine picture. He would to use Bilko's 'common, friendly face' in an ad campaign for a new smoking jacket. Larkin goes to Fort Baxter and Hall now sees the picture. Hall wants Bilko confined to the base for a year. Larkin tells Hall that the Pentagon has cleared Bilko to go to New York. At the Agency, Bilko meets the photographer, Pete Summers (Sandy Kenyon). Bilko starts to ham it up. Larkin tells him they want an everyday normal man look. Bilko wants J.B., the Head of the Agency, to sign him up for a long term contract. Bilko is told they only wanted one picture as a test. If the campaign works, they'll need Bilko for more. Bilko talks J.B. into using Roseville as a test market. Bilko has the platoon go to the store and ask about the smoking jacket. J.B. agrees to let Bilko start a modeling agency. But then J.B. learns that Bilko rigged the whole test market. Erik Rhodes as Advertising Executive Smithers. Jack Collins as MSgt. Andy Pendleton.
97	27	"The Colonel's Inheritance"	Al De Caprio	Phil Sharp, Terry Ryan and Paul Jordan	April 4, 1958
Col. Hall learns from Estate Representative Metcalf (Robert Dryden) that he's inherited $5000. Bilko senses that someone on the base came into money. He thinks it's Ritzik, but he's wrong. Bilko learns Grover sold his car, but he already bought an engagement ring with the money. Bilko finds out it's Hall that has the money. Hall asks WAC Edna to get a couple MP's to take the money to the bank. Bilko sends Barbella and Henshaw, dressed as MP's, to pick up the money. When Patsy the Bookie sees the money, he extends Bilko's credit. The same happens at various places around town. Now that Bilko's credit is good, he goes to the bank to deposit Hall's money. While there, he hears a customer recommend a stock that he says will double that day. Bilko goes to stock broker J. Arnold Simpson to buy the stock. Barbella and Henshaw try to talk Bilko out of it. The stock rises and Barbella and Henshaw tell Bilko to sell. He gets greedy and then the stock plunges. Bilko tries to borrow the money from the bank with no luck. At the Barbershop, Hall hears Simpson talk about a soldier who lost $5000 in the market. Bilko finds a way to get the money and Hall feels bad that he suspected Bilko. Henry Lascoe as Adamapolis. John Marley as Joey the Dealer.
98	28	"Bilko's Honeymoon"	Al De Caprio	Arnie Rosen & Coleman Jacoby	April 11, 1958
Bilko thinks Papparelli is crazy to enter all the contests that he does. Papparelli receives a telegram that he won an all-expenses paid ten-day vacation for two at a hotel in Miami. Bilko wants to go with. He needs to get leave for the two from Col. Hall. Hall will be going away for two weeks. He gives Bilko the leave because he doesn't want to have Bilko at camp while he's gone. Bilko learns that the vacation Papparelli won was for honeymooners. Bilko hopes to sell the tickets to Rupert and Emma Ritzik, but they just laugh at the idea of a second honeymoon. Bilko convinces Papparelli to pose as a woman. The two arrive in Miami and have to face the press. Papparelli has been stuck in the room for five days while Bilko goes out with different women each night. What they don't know is that John and Nell Hall arrived in Miami. They see Bilko's picture in a paper saying he's there with his new wife. They go to Bilko's room to surprise him. They congratulate him and want to meet his wife. Bilko has to find someone to pass off as his wife. Bilko and Dinah (Gretchen Wyler) join the Hall's for dinner. Bilko has it staged so Dinah returns her ring to him and leaves him.
99	29	"Bilko's Chinese Restaurant"	Al De Caprio	Terry Ryan	April 25, 1958
Bilko is charging the men for dancing lessons. Captain Barker comes by and Bilko claims he's teaching the men judo. He brings three new men for the motor pool, Pvt. Anderson, Pvt. Dawson and Pvt. Huang Lee. Bilko makes the three pay for dance lessons. When Lee tells Bilko his father owns ten restaurants, Bilko does what he can to pamper Lee. Bilko gets Lee to play Mahjong and Lee wins much of their money. Bilko dreams that he has many Chinese restaurants and earns much money. The next day, Bilko decides to open a restaurant in town. Lee finds a location. Bilko introduces Lee to Ritzik and Ritzik agrees to cook in the restaurant. Ritzik starts to order what he'll need to make the meals. The men practice being waiters. Ritzik is having a hard time making the Chinese meals. Col. Hall and Captain Barker are surprised to get Chinese food for breakfast. Noticing the huge quantities of Chinese ingredients being ordered by Ritzik, the Pentagon decides to send the men from Fort Baxter to the Pacific island of Macoochi. When Hall sees the Pentagon orders, he knows somethings wrong. Ritzik finally perfects the Chinese meals. Lieutenant Williamson arrives to brief them about the transfer. Bilko finds a way to have Williamson change his mind about the transfer.
100	30	"Operation Love"	Al De Caprio	Arnie Rosen, Coleman Jacoby & Terry Ryan	May 2, 1958
The WAC's of Fort Baxter are becoming unhappy about the time their men are gambling with Bilko. It's the night of the USO Spring Dance and the men are looking forward to it. All Bilko has to do is show them a deck of cards and the men start gambling. The girls have had enough and decide to transfer away from Fort Baxter. After a week there are hardly any WAC's left on the post. Some of the men have to fill in their jobs, which leaves Bilko with less men to gamble with. The men are sad that their girlfriends have left and they blame Bilko. Bilko tries to get a female poetry club to meet with his made-up club. The women look forward to meeting the sensitive men and then Bilko's girl-crazy mob shows up. A Col. Elliott Gruber shows up because he actually is a poetry lover. The men are quite bored with Gruber's long readings. Some of the men start talking about transferring to camps that have WACs. Bilko goes to a WAC training camp hoping to get some of them to come to Fort Baxter. He shows them slides of handsome soldiers he claims are in his motor pool. Then he stages a phone call claiming he gets Hollywood leading men to come to Baxter. It has been a couple days and none of the WACs transferred to Baxter. Before some of the men can leave, the WACs show up. All the men have dates and Bilko has no one to gamble with. Peggy Cass as Daphne Smathers. Danny Dayton as Sgt. Coogan. Philippa Bevans as WAC Capt. Wallace.
101	31	"Bilko's TV Pilot"	Al De Caprio	Arnie Rosen & Coleman Jacoby	May 9, 1958
New recruit Cowboy Pvt. Montana Morgan (Wynn Pearce) arrives at Bilko's barracks. He is loud and outgoing. Montana is driving the men crazy and they want to get rid of him. Knowing that Grover and Ritzik like westerns, Bilko introduces Montana to them. Bilko gets them to transfer Montana to their platoon and Bilko makes some money on the deal. Only Doberman misses Montana. Doberman gives Bilko a letter from CBS. Apparently, Doberman sent CBS a picture of Montana and they are interested in him. Bilko finds a way to return Montana to the motor pool. Bilko and Montana head to New York to see Hubbell Robinson (Alexander Scourby) at CBS. It turns out that the picture Doberman sent was of him and Montana dressed as Cowboys. When Bilko talks to Robinson he learns that they are actually interested in Doberman for a new TV series. Bilko decides to film a western TV pilot with "Tex" Doberman. He tries to get filming equipment from Sgt. J. J. Coogan with no luck. Bilko gets Coogan's girlfriend, Hilda Pavovsky (Jane Dulo), to get the equipment by promising her a part in the pilot. Bilko brings the finished product to have Robinson view it. Everyone leaves before the pilot is over. Back at camp, Bilko learns that Robinson signed Hilda for a western.
102	32	"Bilko Retires from Gambling"	Al De Caprio	Arnie Rosen & Coleman Jacoby	May 16, 1958
Bilko is to go on a trip to Chicago. He needs money. Barbella and Henshaw remind him that Ritzik, Grover and Coogan swore they wouldn't gamble with him. Bilko convinces the three it is their lucky day. The men play and Bilko wins big. Col. Hall tells Captain Barker that they must make Bilko stop gambling. Barker suggests they hire Paul Draylin, a card shark. Hall tells Grover and Coogan about the plan. Draylin poses as Sgt. Pavalone and gets Bilko into a game. Draylin fixes it so Bilko loses $500 to Ritzik. Word of Bilko's loss spreads around the base. Bilko has lost his confidence and says he is retiring from gambling. He turns into a shadow of his former self and morale at Fort Baxter hits an all-time low. Even Hall regrets what he did. Bilko learns the truth about the card shark and recovers his energy. He overhears Hall talking to Captain Newman (Fred Stewart), the base psychiatrist. Bilko seeks revenge and winds up winning all his money back.
103	33	"Bilko's Vacation"	Al De Caprio	Terry Ryan & Neil Simon	May 23, 1958
The Motor Pool has been working hard. Bilko wants to work on Col. Hall to get a vacation. He does anything he can to annoy Hall. Doctor Captain Masters (Fred Stewart) tells Hall he should take a vacation to rest his nerves. Hall doesn't want to leave Bilko unsupervised. Captain Masters suggests that Hall give Bilko and his platoon a vacation at the same time. Bilko can get a free vacation at Dimmeldorf's Lodge if he can convince his platoon to go there as well. The men all have different places they want to go. Bilko finds a way to trick the men into going to Dimmeldorf's. He even finds a way to get Col. and Mrs. Hall to vacation there. Hall doesn't know that Bilko will be there. Once there, the men and Hall figure out they were tricked and Bilko got a free vacation. The men want to leave, but Hall convinces them to stay. Hall finds a way to trick Bilko, Barbella and Henshaw into returning to Fort Baxter. Everyone else will now have a nice time at Dimmeldorf's. Betty Walker as Mrs. Hattie Fender.
104	34	"Bilko's Insurance Company"	Al De Caprio	Arnie Rosen & Coleman Jacoby	May 30, 1958
Papparelli bumps into a parked car while crossing the street, but he's not really hurt. Bilko wants to make some money out of this. The Insurance Man (Russell Hardie) hears Papparelli's story. He tells Bilko the men at Fort Baxter should get a group insurance plan. Bilko decides to start his own insurance company. Bilko tricks the men into taking out accident policies. New recruit Pvt. Wally Gunther (Orson Bean) is one man who didn't take out a policy. Bilko tricks him as well. Henshaw has sold policies to some of the WACs. Bilko's company has a 'maternity benefits' policy which includes a multiple births clause. Bilko is worried because he learns one of the WACs, Sally Fisher (played by Orson's real life wife Rain Winslow), has triplets run in her family and she wants to get married. Pete Gunther, Wally's twin brother, comes to visit. Sally meets Wally and they fall in love. Bilko does what he can to stop the romance from progressing, but it's not really working. Bilko finds a way to get some of the men to chase after Sally. Wally and Sally do get married and have quintuplets. Bilko wants to be Wally's agent when companies want to use him and the children for product endorsements.
105	35	"Bilko's Prize Poodle"	Al De Caprio	Neil Simon & Terry Ryan	June 6, 1958
Bilko is charging the men to write love letters for them. Doberman tells Bilko he wants to cancel his account. Doberman's pen pal Louise is marrying the mailman. Duane is heartbroken. Bilko treats him to a day on the town but Duane spends the money on a poodle instead. The pet shop owner tells him the dog is actually a stray. The owner's assistant makes a mistake and is sending pedigree papers to Doberman. Doberman names the dog Louise and shows her to Bilko. Bilko tells him to return the dog. Bilko then sees the pedigree papers and wants to recover the dog. He goes to the pet shop and finds that a customer (Dan Frazer) bought the dog. Bilko talks the man out of taking the dog. Bilko pampers the dog. Seven months later, the dog has grown. Doberman is temporarily transferred to Alaska and Louise is depressed. Bilko tries to dress and act like Doberman, but Louise knows better. Bilko wants to enter Louise in a dog show in New York to win $10,000. Bilko finds a way to get Doberman to New York. Louise wins in the poodle division. But when the Dog Show Judge (Barnard Hughes) sees the pedigree papers, he realizes they are not for Louise. Louise is disqualified. Edith King as Dowager at Dog Show.
106	36	"Bilko's School Days"	Al De Caprio	Neil Simon & Terry Ryan	June 13, 1958
Bilko has a sure thing horse race bet, but he has no money. He needs to raise $20, but the men have nothing. Bilko unsuccessfully tries to get money from the WACs. Meanwhile, Col. Hall tells WAC Joan that a Major Patterson is coming to inspect the base. He might want to open a training school here for new recruits. Bilko wants to go to another camp where there will be more money. Bilko asks Hall for a transfer and Hall is more than happy to oblige. Bilko then hears that fifteen hundred new recruits might be arriving and he changes his mind about the transfer. Bilko goes to meet Patterson. He will hopefully convince Patterson that this is an intellectual base, perfect for a training school. Patterson is impressed and picks Fort Baxter. Bilko then finds out it will be an MP training school and they'll be learning how to keep gambling of the base. In order to still have a poker game, Bilko has Ritzik make cards out of cookies. But an MP shows up and they have to eat the evidence. Bilko figures if you can't beat 'em, join 'em. He trains to become an MP and then arrests most of the soldiers. Patterson decides to move the school to a vacant base. Frank Marth as MP Lieutenant Anderson.
107	37	"Joan's Big Romance"	Al De Caprio	Arnie Rosen & Coleman Jacoby	June 27, 1958
Joan is going on furlough to Chicago. As Bilko is going to see Joan off, Ritzik comes by with a hundred dollar bill saying he's ready for a poker game. Instead of spending a little time with Joan, Bilko just says a fast goodbye. Joan finds out that Bilko was playing poker instead of being with her and she becomes upset. On the train, playboy socialite Randy Vandermeer (Richard Derr) is trying to avoid some reporters. Joan winds up getting a picture taken with him. She decides to let the reporters publish the picture to retaliate against Bilko. Bilko sees the picture in the paper. Joan tells WAC Nancy (Jane Dulo) that it won't be long before Bilko shows up. Henshaw and Barbella come to the hotel. They make up a story about how distraught Bilko is. He went AWOL, started drinking and is in a flophouse not far away. She needs to go see him. Joan plays along and tells Bilko that she and Randy are getting married. Bilko confronts Randy and learns that he doesn't know her and she made it all up. Joan tells Nancy that she'll take Bilko back, but he'll have to do a little begging first. Bilko retaliates against Joan by showing up with one of Randy's girlfriends, Sabrina. Bilko and Joan make up and are at a restaurant. Trouble starts when Vandermeer just happens to show up and talks to Joan. Back at the base, Bilko and Joan are at first not talking to each other, but then they make up. Things get complicated when Sabrina shows up because she enlisted. Sammy Cahn as The Waiter.

=== Season 4 (1958–59) ===
No. overall	No. in season	Title	Directed by	Written by	Original release date
108	1	"Gold Fever"	Al De Caprio	Neil Simon & Terry Ryan	September 26, 1958
Bilko buys an Army surplus crate with undisclosed contents. He is disappointed when there seems to be nothing of value inside. Only western paraphernalia. Bilko decides to box it up and sells it to Ritzik as he is into westerns. While showing Ritzik the contents, Bilko discovers a picture with a hidden map to a gold mine in Grove City, California. Ritzik does not know this and Bilko buys the picture from him. Bilko, Henshaw and Barbella head out to California. They find the mine is near abandoned Army Camp Fremont. A surveyor says a superhighway will go through this land in six months. He says the lease on the camp has expired and the Army will not renew it. The men go to see Mayor Rickles and trick him into trying to get the Army to renew the lease. Word finally reaches the Pentagon and the Army will reopen the camp. Bilko leads Col. Hall to believe Fort Baxter will be closed. He gets Hall to volunteer to move his men to Camp Fremont. When they arrive at the camp, Hall cannot believe how run down it is. Bilko has the men digging thinking they are looking for water. Several men find gold. Hall tells them it's worthless fool's gold. The men are upset with Bilko. But Doberman reminds them that they are near San Francisco, Hollywood and Las Vegas. Jason Evers as Lieutenant. Alfred Sandor as Major Blackburn.
109	2	"Bilko's Vampire"	Al De Caprio	Arnie Rosen & Coleman Jacoby	October 3, 1958
This is the third time that Ritzik and Grover have left Bilko's poker games early. They claim to have dates. Bilko and the men think Ritzik is stepping out on his wife Emma. It turns out they're watching horror movies on TV. Bilko visits and finds out about the horror movie. Bilko goes to the Grove City TV station to see a J. L. Hawkins (Otto Hulett). He unsuccessfully tries to fool Hawkins into stopping the showing of horror movies. Bilko decides to convince Ritzik that the watching of the movies is turning him into a vampire. Ritzik does start to believe he's becoming a vampire. Bilko's plan backfires when Ritzik doesn't want to play poker because he's afraid he might attack one of the men. Bilko tells Ritzik that a blood test will prove he isn't a vampire. Bilko reads in the paper that Hollywood is looking for someone to star in their new Dracula series. Bilko puts some bat blood in with Ritzik's sample. Captain Masters, MD (Nelson Olmsted) tells Col. Hall about Ritzik's blood test. Bilko plays along with the idea that Ritzik might be a vampire. Bilko finds a way to get to Hollywood with Ritzik. He goes to see Sidney Kruger (Paul Reed) at the studio. Ritzik is dressed as Dracula and he is signed. Ritzik is not happy with the publicity ideas and Bilko shreds the contract. Jack Collins as Sgt. Pendleton. Danny Dayton as Sgt. Coogan.
110	3	"Bilko's De Luxe Tours"	Al De Caprio	Arnie Rosen & Coleman Jacoby	October 10, 1958
The men are talking about what they each will be doing on their weekend pass. Col. Hall tells the men that he expects them to stay out of trouble in San Francisco. The men learn that the train has already left and there won't be another until the next day. Bilko and the men try to get a ride on an old school bus with children, but are kicked off. Bilko finds a way to buy the bus for next to nothing. He plans to set up a coach travel service for GI's. But first he needs to get money to fix it up. Men on the base are lining up to get a ride with the Bilko Bus Company. Bilko then learns that the railroad is expanding their service to include five trains a day to San Francisco and for less money. The lines are now gone. Bilko decides to offer deluxe tours of California and homes of movie stars. Bilko has a busload of people and they start the tour. Bilko has his men pretend to be movie stars and Native Americans. They then go to what Bilko thought was a cheap restaurant. But it has been renovated and the meals are expensive. Bilko and the men wind up making no money. Marcel Hillaire as The Head Waiter. Whitfield Connor as Malcolm's Father. William Bramley as Pvt. Pete Masters. Ethel Remey as P. T. A. President.
111	4	"Bilko the Potato Sack King"	Al De Caprio	Neil Simon & Terry Ryan	October 17, 1958
At the Steadfast Burlap Mill, makers of potato sacks, Harley Eastman tells Roy Eastman (Herb Voland) about the bumper crop of potatoes expected. Roy says they need to increase production and find a great sales manager. Roy suggests Bilko, with whom he was in the South Pacific. Bilko receives a telegram from Roy with a job offer paying $20,000 a year. Bilko tells his men he's leaving the Army to take a job in St. Louis. Col. Hall brings Bilko his Discharge papers. Hall believes Bilko will return before too long. At Bilko's new office, he flirts with his secretary, Miss Laverne. Bilko claims to Roy that he'll be able to sell a million burlap bags. Roy and Harley panic because of all the canceled orders. Apparently a company is producing plastic bags that are cheaper. Roy says their company is finished. Bilko returns to Camp Fremont. After something that Barbella says, Bilko thinks he can talk the Pentagon into making the new-issue army uniforms from burlap. Bilko goes to see Miss Alcott (Erin O'Brien-Moore), La Mode Magazine's editor, in San Francisco. He has her print an article about a new look for service men's uniforms. Word quickly spreads amongst the wives of important service men. The Pentagon agrees to use the new uniforms. They tell Bilko they'll probably need one millions uniforms. Henshaw and Barbella model the uniforms for the generals. The generals ask about the material, which Bilko calls Burlacon. Major Ross (Alfred Sandor) tests the material and finds it to be burlap. They tell Bilko to leave. Dovima as Miss Alcott's Secretary. Arny Freeman as Armand the Waiter.
112	5	"Bilko vs. Covington"	Al De Caprio	Neil Simon, Terry Ryan & Arnie Rosen	October 24, 1958
Bilko wonders why no one is showing up to his gambling events. He learns that the men have been going to Sgt. J. J. Covington's (Keefe Brasselle) dances and poker nights. Even Col. Hal is impressed with Covington's events. Bilko wants to go out with Shirley, but she has a date with Covington. Bilko wants to trick Covington into thinking there's a huge cultured pearl business in a small town in Japan. Knowing that Papparelli can't keep a secret, Bilko tells him about the pearls. Covington sees Bilko trying to learn Japanese off a record. Covington wants to find out what Bilko is up to. He asks some of the men and then talks to Papparelli. Papparelli tells him everything about the pearls. Covington asks Hall for a transfer to the small town in Japan. But he learns from Hall that the town in nowhere near water. He realizes that Bilko made up the story about pearls. Covington then tricks Bilko into thinking that the volcanic ash around the small town is being used in a new wonder drug. Bilko wires his friend in the town and tells him he'll send money to buy up land around the town. Bilko then visits the Du Prey Chemical Company to see Edward Du Prey (House Jameson), the president. Bilko learns that Covington tricked him. The two come to a truce. Suspicion causes both men to each miss a lucrative assignment. Iggie Wolfington as Cpl. Banks.
113	6	"Bilko Joins the Navy"	Al De Caprio	Neil Simon & Terry Ryan	October 31, 1958
Bilko, Paparelli and Zimmerman are on furlough in San Diego with only $7 between them. They meet up with three women, Mame, Myrna and Bridgett (Jean Carson). Some sailors show up with a lot of money and steal the girls away. Bilko decides they should return to Camp Fremont. Seaman Freddie (Frankie Thomas) tells the bartender that he won big money at a Navy crap game. Bilko learns that the game is going on all weekend. A crying sailor (Larry Storch) enters, complaining that he lost money. The sailor gets money from a friend and returns to the game. Bilko and the boys follow him and learn where the game is being held. They then go to an Army-Navy store and get Navy uniforms. Bilko wins big but then the game is raided by Navy MPs. Bilko, Paparelli and Zimmerman wind up on a ship headed to sea. They repeatedly attempt to get off the ship, but fail. Bilko almost finds a way for USN Capt. Spencer (Walter Greaza) to look like he's crazy, but that doesn't work. Bilko, Paparelli and Zimmerman figure they'd rather tell the truth and face prison time, then to be stuck on the ship. But they then find out the first stop is San Francisco and all the men will get leave there. Marty Ingels as Navy Cook. George Maharis as Seaman at Craps Game.
114	7	"Bilko's Big Woman Hunt"	Al De Caprio	Neil Simon & Terry Ryan	November 7, 1958
Henshaw is in love. The men don't trust Bilko with the welfare fund money. Bilko wants to pretend to pick a fight with Henshaw and the men will want Henshaw to hold the money. But Henshaw is so in love, he doesn't fight Bilko. Henshaw tells Bilko it was love at first sight and he would like him to meet Nancy. Henshaw shows Bilko a note that says Nancy is marrying a man she knows in Chicago. Bilko falls head-over-heels in love after he's trapped in an elevator with a beautiful woman. After everyone gets off the elevator, Bilko loses the woman. He's desperate to find her. Bilko goes to the detective division of the police hoping they could track her down. To get their interest, Bilko tells Detective Sullivan (Horace McMahon) that she was a pick-pocket. A police artist draws a picture of her from Bilko's description. It turns out the woman is Ellen Hodges (Hildy Parks), a dance instructor. She gets a call from Ira Cotsworth (Elliott Reid) and he says they're engaged. Ellen says they aren't and he should stop calling her. She tells the Hotel Desk Clerk (Paul Lynde) that if a man comes looking for her, he should kick him out. Bilko comes by with the picture and the Clerk expels him. Bilko's further attempts to enter the hotel fail. Ira arrives and things get confusing. Bilko does get to meet Ellen.
115	8	"The Bilkos and the Crosbys"	Al De Caprio	Neil Simon & Terry Ryan	November 14, 1958
Bing Crosby's son Lindsay joins the army, leading Bilko to wonder what life would be like if he were head of the Crosby clan.
116	9	"Bilko's Allergy"	Al De Caprio	Arnie Rosen & Coleman Jacoby	November 21, 1958
Bilko believes that there's some gambling going on around the base. Papparelli tells him he saw Sherman the Shark (J. D. Cannon) go into a pool room in town. Inside was a large poker game with much money. By the time Bilko arrives, the game is over. Sherman tells him there will be a game next week, but it will be way over Bilko's head. Bilko has a week to raise money. He learns that Col. Hall received a large tax refund check. Bilko scams Hall out of the money by making him think that Papparelli needs it to go on a honeymoon. Bilko is practicing dealing cards when he starts sneezing. Captain Masters, MD tells Bilko that he has developed an allergy. He is allergic to playing cards and has to give up poker. Bilko goes to the big poker game wearing a gas mask. It doesn't work. He tries other ways to play, but he continues to sneeze. Captain Masters believes that Bilko is suffering from a guilt complex. Masters hypnotizes Bilko and finds he feels bad over the way he treated Col. Hall. Bilko wants to throw a surprise testimonial dinner for Hall. Hall becomes suspicious when Bilko does things for him. Hall thinks Bilko is trying to get rid of him. Hall is touched when he learns about the dinner. Bilko wins big at poker and is able to pay Hall back. Frank M. Thomas as Colonel O'Donnell. John Marley as 3rd Poker Player.
117	10	"Bilko and the Chaplain"	Al De Caprio	Arnie Rosen & Coleman Jacoby	November 28, 1958
Bilko has been in San Francisco and he's late returning. When he does arrive, he is ecstatic. He met a beautiful girl there named Sherry. Bilko wants to return immediately. Bilko begs Col. Hall, but Hall says no. Capt. Barker tells Hall that the Pentagon wants every camp to send a platoon to San Francisco for an Army reception. Hall doesn't want Bilko to find out. Without knowing it, Bilko's platoon wins a competition and will go to San Francisco for the weekend. Hall asks the Chaplain (John Gibson) to go with in order to keep Bilko and his men in line. In San Francisco, the Chaplain and Chaplain Donohue are talking to Realtor Duncan (Harold Huber) about their center for military kids. Duncan wants to break the lease in order to build a parking lot on the land. Chaplain thinks Bilko can help them. Through a mix up, Sherry is mad at Bilko. Chaplain says he'll straighten things out with her if Bilko helps him with Duncan. Bilko pretends to be a General and tricks Duncan into giving the Chaplain a new lease. Bilko goes to see Sherry and is picked up by the MPs for impersonating a General. Bilko and the Chaplain try to explain things to Capt. Carter (Don "Red" Barry). Hall is able to work things out and Bilko winds up reading to the little children. Flip Mark as Little Boy.
118	11	"Bilko Presents the McGuire Sisters"	Al De Caprio	Phil Sharp & Terry Ryan	December 5, 1958
Bilko plots to make money off managing the McGuire Sisters. Bilko stages a concert with some of Hollywood's biggest names - Frank Sinatra, Kim Novak and The McGuire Sisters. The names are famous but the faces aren't. When Doberman sends a letter, the real McGuire Sisters arrive at Camp Fremont. Jane Dulo as Other Kim Novak. Bernie West as Sherwood. Note: Features an uncredited appearance by Maude/The Golden Girls star Bea Arthur and Mickey Rooney.
119	12	"Bilko's Secret Mission"	Al De Caprio	Arnie Rosen & Coleman Jacoby	December 12, 1958
Ritzik tells Bilko he has a new method of gambling and it's based on astrology. Capt. Barker tells Captain Masters, MD that Bilko is turning him into a nervous wreck. Gen. Newman arrives and says he's assuming command. Newman tells Bilko that he and his men will be sent on a mission to test the effect of nuclear reactors on tanks. Bilko tries to get out of it until he hears he'll be sent to Yucca Flats which is near Las Vegas. They arrive at Yucca Flats and can't get off the base. Meanwhile, Prof. Von Zimmer is explaining to Prof. Flander that he has developed a magnetizer. It can even make a living thing magnetic. Alcohol will remove the effect. While bringing Von Zimmer his lunch, Ritzik is magnetized. Bilko finds a way to get Ritzik off the base. Then he comes up with a way for him and Henshaw to search for him. They wind up in Las Vegas. While looking for Ritzik, they do a little gambling. They finally find Ritzik and he's winning big at the roulette wheel. Ritzik thinks it's his astrology method but it's really the magnetic power. Before Bilko can make any money, the MPs take them back to the base. Bilko and Ritzik eventually leave the base and return to Vegas. They win $78,000 and celebrate with some champagne. Ritzik loses his magnetic power and they lose all the money. Dean Martin as Unnamed Las Vegas Gambler.
120	13	"Bilko's Giveaway"	Al De Caprio	Arnie Rosen & Coleman Jacoby	December 19, 1958
Bilko, Henshaw and Barbella are going to Hollywood on leave, but have little money. On the train, Bilko meets Mr. Simpson (Matt Crowley), a traveling salesman. Bilko loses the money they have to Simpson while playing cards. At the train station, Bilko becomes excited when he finds a wallet on the ground. It turns out to be Barbella's. Bilko decides to go on a quiz show. Even though he wasn't picked by Mr. Morton (Frank Albertson), the producer, Bilko finds a way to get on the show. Bilko is teamed up with a little boy named Ronald. Thanks to Ronald, Bilko wins $25,000 in prizes. Back at Camp Fremont, Bilko hopes to sell the prizes. He receives a telegram saying he owes $6000 in taxes on the prizes. Bud Burke (Dick Noel), from the Treasury Department, visits. Something Burke says gives Bilko the idea to run his own quiz show in Grove City. The show is called "Grab What You Can". Contestant Doberman becomes a big hit with the audience. But things do not turn out as Bilko planned. Morey Amsterdam as Harry Harris, game show host.
121	14	"Bilko and the Medium"	Al De Caprio	Neil Simon & Terry Ryan	December 26, 1958
Bilko, Henshaw and Barbella visit Mr. Bascom (Fred Stewart) at the Grove City Finance and Loan Co. Bilko wants to borrow $500 to open a pool room and bowling alley. But without any real collateral, Bilko doesn't get the loan. Bilko hopes to get Ritzik to put up his house as collateral. Ritzik and Emma have gone to see medium Madame Zaboda (Jorie Remus). At the seance, Ritzik makes contact with his grandfather who says Ritzik will come into money soon. Back at home, Ritzik receives a telegram saying he won $1000 at the legion post raffle. Bilko arrives and tries to trick Emma into signing the loan agreement using her house as collateral. Bilko sees the telegram and Emma kicks him out. While Emma is asleep, Bilko learns from Ritzik that he goes to see Madame Zaboda and he believes in the spirit world. Bilko gets manicurist Flossie (Charlotte Rae) to pretend to be a medium. Ritzik and Emma visit to see Madame Flossie. Bilko is surprised because they brought Madame Zaboda and her assistant Mr. Gregory along. Emma believes she is in contact with her Uncle Herman. Emma is about to agree to invest in Bilko's bowling alley, when Mr. Gregory proves it is a hoax. Madame Zaboda tells Emma she will guard her money. Flossie overhears Mr. Gregory tell a barber that he and Madame Zaboda are leaving town. Bilko proves that Madame Zaboda is a fake and he recovers Ritzik's money. Emma is so happy she lends him the money for the bowling alley. Bilko has second thoughts and returns the money.
122	15	"Bilko's Bopster"	Al De Caprio	Arnie Rosen & Coleman Jacoby	January 2, 1959
Famous Jazz drummer Skinny Sanders (Ronny Graham) has been drafted. Bilko has been playing poker for 22 hours straight and wants to sleep. Suddenly there is much noise because Skinny has been assigned to Bilko's platoon and he was banging on a garbage can. Bilko and the men don't know who he really is. Skinny keeps disrupting the men's routine. Then one night Skinny brings in a teenage girl (Diane Shalet) to dance to some records. Captain Barker comes by and says that the Grove City Police Chief's daughter is missing. He is searching all the buildings. Bilko manages to get Barker to search somewhere else. The next day, Bilko comes to Barker's office with some transfer papers. At first Barker becomes excited because he thinks Bilko is transferring. But Bilko wants Skinny transferred to Alaska. Barker tells Bilko that Skinny is a famous Jazz musician and he makes a lot of money. Bilko now wants Skinny to stay. Skinny went AWOL, but they find him. Bilko wants Skinny to form an Army Jazz band and tour. Bilko goes to San Francisco and tricks some jazz musicians into enlisting. Bilko was hoping to go along on a European tour with the band, but he learns that General Caldwell will go instead. Larry Storch as Bopster - The Professor. Josip Elic as Bopster. Bob Hastings as Master Sgt - Recruiter.
123	16	"Bilko's Hollywood Romance"	Al De Caprio	Arnie Rosen & Coleman Jacoby	January 9, 1959
Hollywood star Monica Malamar (Julie Wilson) is making headlines and they are not the good kind. J.P., the Studio Head, says the bad press will ruin her upcoming movie. Smitty (Frank Maxwell), her Agent, tells her they've started a publicity campaign. She's been named sweetheart of Camp Fremont, where they will premiere the movie this Saturday. They want to take some pictures of her and a "simple, clean cut" soldier. Bilko tricks Captain Barker into letting him pick up Monica. At the hotel, Bilko pretends to be a shy, country-boy soldier. Smitty thinks he'd be perfect for Monica to have a short romance with. Bilko and Monica get their picture in the paper. The next day, Smitty visits Bilko. To continue his scheme, Smitty tells Bilko that Monica has fallen in love with him. Bilko heads out to Hollywood and has several dates with Monica. J.P. tells Monica that they are getting great publicity out of this. Monica says she can't stand anymore. Bilko comes by and starts to tell J.P. how to do his job. Monica likes some of Bilko's ideas, especially the ones involving more money for her. Smitty schemes to get rid of Bilko. Director Emil Petrov (Leon Belasco) makes Bilko think he can be a famous actor. They will then offer him a contract if he gives up Monica. Monica tells Bilko he's been tricked. Bilko then tricks J.P. into signing Monica's contract for more money and leaves.
124	17	"Bilko's Grand Hotel"	Al De Caprio	Neil Simon & Terry Ryan	January 30, 1959
Bilko and the men open a pizza stand on the highway. Bilko hopes it will be the first of many. When they arrive at the stand, it has burned down. Bilko goes to Leroy Sherman, the real estate broker that sold them the stand. Sherman says they haven't got a case against him as they should have had insurance. Bilko doesn't know what to do with all the food he has. Sherman suggests buying a run-down hotel in town and opening a restaurant. Bilko reads in the paper that Oscar Perkins (House Jameson), vice president of the Conrad Hilton hotel chain, will come to Grove City. They decide to buy the run-down hotel and sell it to Perkins. Bilko manages to buy the hotel with a $300 deposit. Bilko learns from Sherman that the property was owned by Hilton hotels and Perkins was visiting town to sell it. To make matters worse, Bilko has to confess to Ritzik that he sold Ritzik's car to get the $300. Ritzik gives him three days to recover the money. Bilko runs into a panhandler named Chester Hilton (Irwin Corey). Bilko makes Chester president of the hotel and Bilko calls it The Grove City Hilton. Bilko hopes that Perkins will want to buy out his hotel in order to protect the good name of their business. A husband (Frank M. Thomas) and wife (Paula Trueman) arrive and are surprised how run down the Hilton hotel is. Perkins arrives and offers to buy the hotel for $5000. Before Chester can sign the papers, they learn the hotel burned down. Perkins gives Bilko the $300 he originally paid and Perkins pays Chester to change his name. Jane Dulo as The Waitress.
125	18	"Bilko's Credit Card"	Al De Caprio	Arnie Rosen & Coleman Jacoby	February 6, 1959
Bilko is in a San Francisco restaurant with a woman named Gloria. He calls Henshaw because he needs money right away. Gloria discovers that Bilko has no money and is about to leave. Grover arrives and because he has much money, Gloria goes to another table with him. Later, Bilko goes to the Diner's Guild branch to apply for a credit card. After Bilko's references are researched, his application is rejected. Bilko decides to set up the GI's Gourmet Guild credit card for the soldiers of Camp Fremont. Bilko visits restaurateur Alfredo (Joseph Calleia), hoping he will join the credit service. Alfredo isn't interested, but then Bilko sweet talks his wife Maria. Bilko then goes to see restaurateur Mike (Al Lewis). Bilko manages to get several more restaurants interested. Now he has to get the men to pay a $2 membership fee to get his credit service. The men at the camp rack up huge bills at the local restaurants. Bilko needs to collect the fees to pay the bills. He learns three of the battalions were sent away on war games. The restaurateurs give Bilko 24 hours to pay. Bilko tricks General Putnam (Al Hodge) into returning the men to Camp Fremont. He pays off the restaurateurs and then dissolves the GI's Gourmet Guild. Marcel Hillaire as The Waiter.
126	19	"Viva Bilko"	Al De Caprio	Neil Simon & Terry Ryan	February 13, 1959
Bilko, Doberman, Zimmerman, and Paparelli are on a three-day pass to Mexico. At first they are having fun. But after they enter a restaurant, Bilko, Zimmerman, and Paparelli are robbed. The bandits take their money, uniforms and identification papers. Doberman arrives and is also robbed. After the bandits leave, the owner gives them some Mexican clothes to wear. Bilko and the men unsuccessfully attempt to cross the border back into the States. A man approaches them and says he can get them across the border. They learn from Pedro (Leon Belasco) that they'll board a bus to the Rio Grande. They will have to swim across to Arizona where they will spend a couple months picking melons. But before they leave, they are arrested and jailed. The jailer (Arny Freeman) posts a wanted poster of El Muchacho, who resembles Doberman. He sees Doberman and thinks he is El Muchacho. Meanwhile, the bandits wore the Army uniforms and robbed a bank. They hear that El Muchacho has been jailed and decide to free him. Bilko and the men realize they are the bandits who robbed them. The real El Muchacho arrives. The bandits return their uniforms to them knowing that the police are looking for soldiers who robbed the bank. At the border they are arrested. They finally escape. Harold Huber as Bandit #1. Carlos Montalbán as Bandit #2. Leonardo Cimino as Bandit #3. Bob Hastings as The Customs Officer. Henry Beckman as Mexican Girl's Husband.
127	20	"The Colonel's Promotion"	Al De Caprio	Arnie Rosen & Coleman Jacoby	February 20, 1959
Col. Hall anticipates being promoted to Brigadier General. He monitors Bilko and his men to make sure nothing goes wrong. Bilko is upset that he has not been able to have a poker game in over a week. Bilko has Grover insert a transmitter into Hall's fountain pen to monitor his movements. The next night, they play poker and track Hall. When he approaches, Bilko has the men put away the cards. Lt. Anderson gives Hall a telegram from the Pentagon. Hall's promotion has been turned down. Hall tells Bilko he's thinking of retiring. Bilko tells Hall to complain to General Wakefield and demand the promotion. Nell Hall tells the Chaplain she's worried that her husband will ruin his career. The chaplain asks Bilko to go to Washington to stop Hall. Bilko finds Hall at a hotel in D.C. To improve Hall's promotion's chances Bilko gets him into the president's golfing foursome. Pro golfer Claude Harmon will also be playing. Bilko figures when Wakefield hears that Hall played with the president, he will be promoted. Back at the camp, Hall says he was given the promotion, but he declined. If he became a general, he would have to leave Camp Fremont.
128	21	"Bilko's Sharpshooter"	Al De Caprio	Neil Simon & Terry Ryan	February 27, 1959
On the firing range, Pvt. Pete Masters (William Bramley) is doing well. Ritzik is making much money on people betting against Masters. Bilko is upset because his platoon has been assigned to replacing the targets. Someone just shot ten consecutive bullseyes. Bilko wants to discover who and make money off of that person. It turns out to be WAC Polly Porter (Peggy Cass). She is not supposed to be there and is sent away. She is replaced by Pvt. Emile Schneider, who can barely see the target. Bilko thinks that Schneider was the crack shot. He tricks Grover into transferring Schneider to his platoon. Bilko bets Ritzik on a shooting match between Masters and Schneider. Bilko loses big. But then he finds out about Polly Porter. Bilko wants to get rich by promoting her as the new Annie Oakley. Col. Hall is transferring Polly to a camp in Texas where she's from. Bilko gets Hall to think he's going to marry Polly and Hall transfers another WAC to Texas. Bilko bets Ritzik again. But Polly and Masters are smitten with each other and neither can now hit the target.
129	22	"Bilko's Formula Seven"	Al De Caprio	Arnie Rosen & Coleman Jacoby	March 6, 1959
Pvt. Jenkins shows Bilko a jug of applejack sent to him from home. Bilko tells him to get rid of it quickly. Jenkins tells Bilko that he poured it into the crankcase of the Colonel's jeep. Bilko wants him to remove it from the crankcase before it ruins the jeep. Some of it gets on Jenkins face, making him look ten years younger. Bilko thinks he can cash in on the miracle cream. Jenkins tells him the applejack's ingredients. They make another batch of the mixture and Bilko wants to try some on Cpl. Fender. Bilko mistakenly puts some on Col. Hall's face. When it is removed, Hall looks younger. Bilko fills jars with the cream and goes to a department store in town. E. J. Phillips tells Bilko he'll need a good advertising campaign for the product. Bilko wants to film a commercial with Rupert and Emma Ritzik. Bilko then goes to Deborah Darling (Natalie Schafer) Beauty Products, Inc. He shows Deborah the commercial. When Deborah learns of the ingredients from her laboratory, she kicks Bilko out. Fender tricks Bilko into thinking the mixture grows hair.
130	23	"Bilko's Ape Man"	Al De Caprio	Arnie Rosen & Coleman Jacoby	March 20, 1959
Col. Hall tells Bilko that the new man in his platoon, Pvt. Chuck Forbes, is a fitness instructor. He wants Forbes to get Bilko's men into shape. After a few days, Bilko has had enough. Papparelli tells Bilko that a movie studio is looking for a new Tarzan and offer a $100,000 contract. To get Forbes' name known, Bilko hopes to have him win the upcoming Mr. Universe contest. Bilko tricks Emma Ritzik into giving him her leopard skin coat to make a loincloth for Forbes. Bilko hires a woman (Lucille Ball) to scream and faint when Forbes appears on stage. Something Bilko does to Ursula Thorndyke (Edith King), editor of Body Health magazine, gets Forbes disqualified. As a publicity stunt, Bilko wants Doberman to wear a gorilla suit and fight his "Tarzan". When Col. Hall tells Captain Barker that he saw a gorilla on base, Barker thinks he's seeing things. A hunter comes by and tells Hall he saw the gorilla. Hall has the whole camp hunting for the gorilla with shoot to kill orders. Bilko tells Hall the gorilla is Doberman. Bilko tells Forbes he's sorry things didn't work out. Bilko then has to deal with an angry Emma. John Alexander as General Alexander.
131	24	"Warrant Officer Paparelli"	Al De Caprio	Neil Simon & Terry Ryan	March 27, 1959
Lieutenant Blake rides Bilko and his men hard so they want to get rid of him. Blake tells them that he is being transferred to Germany. He says that things are not going to be easier for them after he leaves. He left strict instructions for the next officer. Bilko decides to have someone from his own platoon promoted to officer status. Bilko thinks Dino Paparelli would be perfect. Barbella finds out that will be no openings at the officer training school for a year. General Wheeler (John Alexander) visits for an inspection. After several attempts, Bilko causes Wheeler promote Paparelli to warrant officer of the motor pool. Col. Hall is upset with Paparelli because he allows Bilko to gamble in the barracks. Paparelli becomes as tough on the men as Lieutenant Blake was. Bilko finds a way to have Paparelli demoted back to private.
132	25	"Bilko's Godson"	Al De Caprio	Neil Simon & Terry Ryan	April 3, 1959
Bilko is indebted and decides to legally change his name to avoid his creditors. He picks the name Woodrow Hopkins. Bilko receives a telegram from their old supply sergeant, Joey Moran. Joey had a baby boy and wants Bilko to be the godfather. Because they are going to name the baby after Bilko, he decides to not change his name. In San Francisco, Bilko goes to the baby's christening. Bilko takes the baby for a walk in the park. There he compares babies with a Dennis Harper, Sr. (Walter Brooke) and things get a little heated. Wanting the best for his godson, Bilko tries to enroll him in the Stanford University class of '77. At the school, Bilko learns that Stanford will only accept enrollment reservations from former students. Later, Bilko returns and speaks with Mrs. Whitcomb (Doro Merande). He tries to enroll himself. Without a high school diploma, he will have to take an entrance exam. Bilko wants to find someone else to take the test for him. Bilko discovers that Pvt. Fleischman is good at history. Meanwhile, Turk the Bookie (Paul Lipson) arrives, wanting his $200. Turk is good at math and Moose, Turk's henchman, is good at science. Bilko schemes to have the three men to take the tests for him. Bilko is able to enroll the baby. Dick Cavett as Student in Front Row.
133	26	"Guinea Pig Bilko"	Al De Caprio	Arnie Rosen & Coleman Jacoby	April 17, 1959
Col. Hall is worried because it will soon be payday. He knows that Bilko will go after the men's money. Captain Barker suggests paying the men before Bilko wakes up. Bilko wakes up early and manages to get money from some of the men. Hall and Barker catch Bilko. Major Wallace, MD (Dan Frazer), from the Pentagon, visits Hall. Wallace says Camp Fremont has been chosen to test a new tranquilizer. When Hall learns the tranquilizer will stop a chronic trouble maker, he thinks of Bilko. Wallace says that the men must not know they are being given the drug. Bilko runs a crooked bingo game to make money. Hall tricks Bilko into going to the base hospital. There Wallace gives Bilko the tranquilizer, which Bilko thinks is just aspirin. Henshaw and Barbella notice something different about Bilko. The men confront Bilko about the crooked bingo game and he returns their money to them. Bilko is sedate. Without Bilko taking their money, the men are free to gamble all they want. Barker tells Hall it's worse than when Bilko was running things. Hall says the experiment has backfired. Hall and Wallace return Bilko to his normal self. Jim Boles as Lt. Fletcher.
134	27	"Bilko, the Butler"	Al De Caprio	Arnie Rosen & Coleman Jacoby	April 24, 1959
The newspaper mentions a soldier who wed an heiress at the Camp Fremont Chapel. The chaplain tells Bilko that the couple met at the USO. Bilko, Henshaw and Barbella go to the San Francisco USO. It takes some doing with a Pvt. Emile Schneider, but Bilko is able to get an invitation to have lunch at a mansion. Bilko thinks that Jason Rogers will be the rich owner, but he turns out to be the butler. Rogers tells Bilko that the owner is Mathew Cunningham. Bilko learns that the Cunninghams' have a daughter named Deborah. Bilko is excited until he meets ten-year-old Deborah. He then learns that the Cunninghams will host a dinner party for some rich friends. Mrs. Rogers says all that the friends discuss are stock market tips. When Jason says they'll have to hire some help, Bilko volunteers to be a butler. Bilko calls Henshaw and tells him to round up some money. Bilko plots to make a fortune by picking up the stock tips. That night, Bilko just misses hearing various tips as he tries to serve hors d'oeuvres. One of the guests spreads a false tip to prop up his business. Bilko calls Henshaw. He then learns the tip was bad and he fears that he lost all his money. Upon returning to camp, he learns Henshaw couldn't buy the stock. Bilko learns that Pvt. Schneider married an heiress.
135	28	"Ritzik Goes Civilian"	Al De Caprio	Arnie Rosen & Coleman Jacoby	May 1, 1959
Ritzik lost much money playing poker and is afraid to go home to Emma. Bilko brings him to Emma on a stretcher claiming he was hit by a car. She does not believe it. The next day, Bilko hopes to calm Emma by returning half of Ritzik's money. He goes to the mess hall and meets Mess Sgt. Logan. Logan tells Bilko that Ritzik left the Army. Ritzik tells Bilko that Emma forced him to leave the Army and she made plans for their future. Everyone is mad at Bilko. Henshaw and Barbella tell him that everyone will wind up broke except him. Bilko daydreams that he is rich and all his friends are bums. Back to reality, Henshaw tells Bilko that Ritzik bought a diner. The diner is doing poorly. Bilko, Henshaw and Barbella visit it. Ritzik tells Bilko how bad business is because it is poorly located. He wants Bilko to help him. Bilko visits Mayor Stanley Stevens (John C. Becher) of Sunnyville. Bilko creates an elaborate story and gets double Ritzik's money back. Bilko wants Ritzik back in the Army, but Emma wants to open a luncheonette in Chicago. Bilko schemes to get Ritzik back in the Army.
136	29	"Bilko's Small Car"	Al De Caprio	Neil Simon & Terry Ryan	May 8, 1959
Bilko has the men put a secret compartment in his jeep so he can transport gambling equipment. Barbella tells Bilko that the equipment is ready to be picked up. Col. Hall wants Bilko to go into town and pick up his new foreign car. Bilko takes the new car and retrieves the gambling equipment. After he goes to get more, two policemen admire the car. They find the equipment and impound the car. Bilko tells Hall that there was a problem with the car that needed to be repaired. Hall wants to see the car by Friday. Bilko tells the men that they'll build a French car out of one of the jeeps. Bilko delivers the car to Hall. Hall says it doesn't look like the one he ordered. Bilko tells him it is a newer model. The car dealer delivers Hall's original car. The police had returned it to the dealership. The dealer likes the look of the car Bilko built. Bilko decides to make money selling fake foreign cars. He invents an explanation why Hall's original car is back. Bilko rents a showroom and receives nine orders and deposits for cars. Bilko schemes to get Hall to condemn ten jeeps. After Hall talks to Col. Watkins, who saw Bilko's car in the showroom, Hall understands Bilko's plan.
137	30	"Doberman: Missing Heir"	Al De Caprio	Arnie Rosen & Coleman Jacoby	May 15, 1959
Bilko sees on TV that Lord Edward Rockford (Ronald Long) and his wife Lady Victoria Rockford are in San Francisco. They are searching for their long lost son and heir, who will inherit $50,000,000. When they visited America 35 years ago, their baby boy disappeared. They are offering $5000 for any information. Barbella notices a resemblance between Victoria and Doberman. And he says Doberman was a foundling and his aunt raised him. Bilko finds the birthmark on Doberman that the Rockford's mentioned. Bilko takes Doberman to the hotel where the Rockford's are staying. They learn that there are ten other men there claiming to be the son, but Bilko gets rid of them. Victoria is certain Doberman is her son. Doberman is taught the finer things and he no longer wants to associate with Bilko. Bilko wants to set Doberman up with burlesque dancer Dixie Darcell (Jane Kean). When she becomes Lady Rockford, he'll get some of Doberman's money from her. Bilko talks Dixie into meeting Doberman and the two spend much time together. Doberman tells Bilko that he and Dixie are getting married. Bilko now has second thoughts because he doesn't want Doberman to get hurt. Lord Rockford tells Bilko that they made a mistake and Doberman is not their son. The real son was found. Bilko tells Doberman and finds a way for him to give up on Dixie. Jason Evers as Don Nelson - Interviewer.
138	31	"Bilko's Casino"	Al De Caprio	Neil Simon & Terry Ryan	May 22, 1959
Bilko and his men gamble in the dispensary, because there is no other safe place, but Col. Hall knows they were gambling. As punishment, they have to clean the Grove City USO. The men find gambling equipment in the basement of the USO. Miss Adams (Sloan Simpson), the hostess, tells Bilko that the equipment belonged to the original owner of the house. Apparently, the building is the only place in California where gambling is legal. Bilko wants to convert the USO into a casino. Bilko has the USO close. He is able to take over the lease for five years. Bilko tells Hall he wants two weeks furlough to open his casino. Hall thinks he's joking. When Hall finds that the casino is legal, he vows to shutter it. Travis Randall (Melville Ruick), from an amusement corporation, offers a deal to Bilko. Bilko meets with Rudy Coral (Murray Matheson), the president of the corporation. Rudy basically forces Bilko to sign everything about the casino to him. Bilko passes Doberman off as an FBI agent. He then tricks Coral into turning the casino into a new USO. Doro Merande as Assistant USO Hostess. Al Lewis as Mobster Bengal.
139	32	"The Colonel's Second Honeymoon"	Al De Caprio	Arnie Rosen & Coleman Jacoby	May 29, 1959
A record heat wave has hit California, with no relief in sight. Bilko is charging the men to take turns staying in his air-conditioned office. The air-conditioner breaks down. Bilko tries to get a furlough to go somewhere cold, but Col. Hall refuses. Hehshaw says that as long as Hall is in camp, Bilko won't get a furlough. Papparelli tells Bilko that General Terry Wade is coming to camp. He is an old boyfriend of Nell Hall and the Colonel is not happy about it. Hall gets upset because Nell is having such a good time with Terry. Bilko talks Hall into going on a second honeymoon. Bilko is then able to talk Captain Barker into giving him his furlough. Bilko goes to a ski lodge in the Rockies. He is surprised to see Hall and Nell there. Nell tells him she won't tell her husband. She also says that since the night that Terry came by, Hall has been jealous of every man who talks to her. Bilko tells Nell that he has a plan. Bilko gets several beautiful women to flirt with Hall thinking he is a movie producer. Hall enjoys the attention and Nell pretends to be jealous. This somehow brings Nell and Hall closer together again. Virginia Martin as The Waitress. Marilyn Hanold as Lauren.
140	33	"Bilko in Outer Space"	Al De Caprio	Neil Simon & Terry Ryan	June 5, 1959
While gambling, Grover and Ritzik win $600 and want to spend it on their furlough to Hawaii. But it is seven days until they leave and they can't let Bilko know they have the money, so they avoid him. But Bilko finds out anyway. Grover camps in a forest and Ritzik stays at a drive-in movie. The next day, Bilko hunts for the men in the camp kitchen, so Grover and Ritzik hide in the freezer for hours. Bilko pretends to be Jose Garcia of the Cuban Army, here to inspect the kitchen. Bilko plays cards with Grover and Ritzik until Grover sees through his disguise. When Col. Hall comes to reprimand Grover and Ritzik for not being in the kitchen, they think it's Bilko. Henshaw informs Bilko of a space endurance test where men spend three days in a chamber. Bilko has to trick Grover and Ritzik into volunteering for the test. Papparelli and Zimmerman mention the test to Grover and Ritzik. Bilko gets Rudy (Paul Lynde), the soda jerk from the drugstore, to pose as a doctor. Rudy tells Grover and Ritzik that they passed the physical for the test. The two then enter the space chamber. Bilko does not join them because he has to drive Hall to a camp in Nevada and they will be gone for three days. Three days later and Grover and Ritzik have one hour left. Bilko arrives and enters the chamber and wins all of their money, but Hall makes Bilko return the money to them.
141	34	"The Bilko Boycott"	Al De Caprio	Arnie Rosen & Coleman Jacoby	June 12, 1959
It's pay day at the camp and Bilko has a plan to get the men's money. Bilko sets up a camera club and tells the men there will be a beautiful female model to photograph. Bilko charges them for each picture they take. Col. Hall asks what's going on. Bilko makes the club appear legitimate. Henshaw reconsiders taking the men's money and tells Bilko off. Bilko wonders why the men no longer come to play poker. Barbella tells him that Henshaw set up Gamblers Anonymous at Camp Fremont. Ritzik is close to being tempted to gamble with Bilko, when Papparelli tries to stop him. Bilko tries to get the WACs to gamble with him. Bilko gets WAC Major Allenby (Philippa Bevans) to agree to let the WACs attend some lectures at the Motor Pool. Under the guise of a lecture, Bilko runs a Bingo game. Bilko has other ways for the women to gamble. Bilko will go to San Francisco for the weekend. He'll have to enter the WAC barracks that night to collect his money. Barbella tells him he could be court martialed if he is caught. Bilko is in the barracks. A WAC nurse tells the women that the barracks will be under quarantine for one week due to an outbreak of measles. Bilko calls Henshaw. The men extract Bilko and he later comes down with the measles. Jane Kean as WAC Marion. Jane Dulo as WAC Pvt. Mildred Lukens.
142	35	"Weekend Colonel"	Al De Caprio	Neil Simon & Terry Ryan	June 19, 1959
Colonel Hall tells Captain Barker that he has brought television to Camp Fremont. Specifically, it is a closed-circuit television to monitor experiments in the gas chamber. When Hall turns the TV on, he sees Bilko and his men shooting craps in the chamber. Hall confronts Bilko and says he will place a camera in every building in the camp. Hall and his wife will spend the weekend in Lake Tahoe. Bilko and Barbella are in a diner at town. Bilko notices that Charlie Clusterman, the cook, resembles Col. Hall. Bilko offers Charlie $50 to impersonate Hall for the weekend, but Charlie refuses. Bruno the Mobster (Al Lewis) demands $150 from Charlie. Charlie agrees to Bilko's offer if he raises the pay to $150, which Bilko does. Charlie orders Barker to remove all of the cameras as Bilko gave his word there would be no more gambling. Bilko now wants to run a Monte Carlo Night in the Officer's Club. To make it look legitimate, they'll pretend the money is going to charity. Hall and Nell return early and enter the diner. Marge the Waitress (Jane Dulo) thinks it's Charlie. Bilko also mistakes Hall for Charlie. Hall realizes what the situation is. Charlie agrees to grow a beard, the money is given to charity and Bilko is placed in the guard house.

=== Special (1959) ===
Title	Directed by	Written by	Original release date
"The Phil Silvers Pontiac Special: Keep in Step"	Al De Caprio	Unknown	January 23, 1959
In this hour-long special, Bilko stages a musical celebration of silver screen beauties entitled Bilko's Brevities.
