= List of Car 54, Where Are You? episodes =

This is the list of episodes from the television sitcom Car 54, Where Are You?.

== Series overview ==
Season	Episodes	Originally released	
Season	Episodes	First released	Last released
1	30	September 17, 1961	April 22, 1962
2	30	September 16, 1962	April 14, 1963

== Episodes ==
=== Season 1 (1961–62) ===
No. overall	No. in season	Title	Directed by	Written by	Original release date
1	1	"Who's for Swordfish?"	Al De Caprio	Terry Ryan & Nat Hiken	September 17, 1961
Lucille Toody (Beatrice Pons) is upset that her husband, Police officer Gunther Toody, is going fishing with fellow officer Francis Muldoon. Gunther never spends a day off with her. While out on their tiny row boat, Toody and Muldoon see a large cabin cruiser sail by. They realize the ship is Officer Dennis O'Hara's (Albert Henderson) brother-in-law's. Toody and Muldoon try doing favors for O'Hara in hopes of being invited to fish on the cruiser. The favors wind up backfiring on O'Hara. He will ask his brother-in-law to invite Toody and Muldoon to go fishing, if they stop doing favors for him. The dates for the fishing trip get changed, so Toody and Muldoon have to do a lot of shift-swapping with the entire precinct. They finally get everything straightened out and Muldoon remembers they're scheduled for traffic court on the day of the trip. Now they have more juggling to do. Toody stops a driver for running a stop sign. Muldoon tells Toody to not give the driver a ticket. The driver, Harold Conroy, doesn't believe he did anything wrong. He wants a ticket so he can go to court to prove it. Things get very confusing when other police officers show up. Muldoon writes out a ticket. Captain Paul Block (Paul Reed) now has to do some rescheduling so Toody and Muldoon don't have to go to court. On the day of the trip, Toody and Muldoon are waiting on the dock but the brother-in-law doesn't show up. It turns out that Harold Conroy is the brother-in-law and he is in court that day. Nipsey Russell as Officer Dave Anderson. Hank Garrett as Officer Ed Nicholson. Frederick O'Neal as Officer Wally Wallace.
2	2	"Something Nice for Sol"	Al De Caprio	Terry Ryan & Nat Hiken	September 24, 1961
Toody drives the entire station crazy chairing the committee to get Sgt. Sol Abrams a surprise 25th year present. Everytime they decide on a gift, Toody wants to get something else. Captain Block tells Toody the committee should pick one last thing and no more changes. Abrams' sore feet confine him to desk work. The officers in the committee have had enough and leave. Later, Sol is talking to his wife Sandra (Mildred Clinton). Because everyone gets quiet when he's around, Sol thinks they know something. Sol is worried that, if the brass learns of his feet, it'll be 25 and out. After more indecision, Toody decides to buy orthopedic shoes for Abrams. Webster the Orthopedist (Gerald Hiken) tells Toody and Muldoon there are many factors to consider when getting the right fit for the shoes. Webster comes by the precinct to observe Sol when he walks. Sol thinks Webster is from the brass and panics. Webster tells Toody and Muldoon that he needs a plaster cast of Sol's feet. They ask Sandra for her help. That night they give Sol a sleeping pill. Things get complicated, but they get the plaster casts. At the party, Sol gets his shoes and he loves how they make his feet feel. Bernie West as Haberdasher Harry. Albert Henderson as Officer Steinmetz. Janet Fox as Mother. Judith Lowry as Woman in Shoe Store.
3	3	"Home Sweet Sing Sing"	Nat Hiken	Marty Roth & Nat Hiken	October 1, 1961
Ex-convict Backdoor Benny Harper (Gene Baylos) comes to the station looking for Toody. Capt. Block and some of the men are suspicious. Toody says he wants to rehabilitate Benny. Gunther talks his wife Lucille into letting Benny stay at their house for awhile. But his insistence on his prison routine surprises Toody and Lucille. Toody and Muldoon get Benny a job at Mr. Klein's (Michael Vale) men's wear store. But when they learn that Klein's family members are not always honest, they feel it might not be the right place. They then get Benny a job at the Milhauser Piano Company. But they find out Benny will be a messenger and take the company's cash receipts to the bank. Capt. Block can't believe they got Benny a job handling money. Block has his men keep a close eye on Benny. Benny is still homesick about prison. Toody and Muldoon want to show Benny that they trust him, so they have him go out by himself for the night. Benny goes to the police station and confesses to a robbery that he didn't commit because he wants to go back to prison. He finally steals the Captain's watch so he can go back. Bernard Barrow as Officer in station. Bruce Kirby as Arresting Officer.
4	4	"Change Your Partner"	Nat Hiken	Tony Webster & Nat Hiken	October 8, 1961
Chief R. D. Bradley (Dan Frazer) of the Bureau of Personnel is interviewing Officer Nelson and Officer Hamilton (Bruce Kirby). Bradley wants to know why after 16 months they want to be transferred to other partners. Bradley learns that Toody and Muldoon have been partners for 9 years. If he can discover their secret and replicate it, that'll save the blue brass many headaches. Bradley calls Capt. Block and tells him he'll be stopping by to talk about Toody and Muldoon. After Block asks the two about their time together, they each begin to suspect that the other wants a transfer. Bradley comes to the station and Toody and Muldoon are bickering with each other. Block immediately straightens them out. When Bradley interviews both of them, Toody and Muldoon start to find faults with each other. They are out on patrol and start to annoy each other. Back at the station, Bradley has some reporters there because they want to do a story about Toody and Muldoon's friendship. The two come in fighting. Block assigns each of them a new partner several times. When the other officers complain about being with Toody and Muldoon, Block finds a way to get them back together. Bruce Glover as Officer Reilly. Arthur Anderson as Clerk Logan.
5	5	"I Won't Go"	Nat Hiken	Gary Belkin & Nat Hiken	October 15, 1961
Al Spencer (Al Lewis) is trying to get Mrs. Rachael Bronson (Molly Picon), a sweet old Jewish grandmother, out of her condemned apartment building. Georgie Carmody serves Mrs. Bronson the final set of papers saying she must leave in 24 hours. It's now three days later and no city department can get Mrs. Bronson to leave. Deputy Commissioner Leonard O'Malley (Matt Crowley) calls Capt. Block. Toody and Muldoon come over to see her, but they can't seem to get through to her. She knows it's an election year and there'd be very bad headlines in the news involving the police that forcibly put an old woman out on the streets. Muldoon fixes her leaking water pipe. Capt. Block tells Toody and Muldoon he will be firm with her, but he gets nowhere. Even O'Malley can't get her to move out. The Health Dept. Inspector Mary Henderson is then sent. Mrs. Bronson calls and wants Toody and Muldoon to come by again. O'Malley and Block hope that this means she's finally moving. Mrs. Bronson tells Muldoon she found a woman for him, Mary Henderson. She finally tells Toody and Muldoon she won't leave until her dog Queenie comes home. They find the dog, but it actually belongs to the grandson of Mr. Martin. As it turns out, Mr. Martin has a room to rent and needs someone to watch his grandson. Later, Toody and Muldoon run into Rachael, Mr. Martin and the boy. Mrs. Bronson is deciding whether to marry Mr. Martin.
6	6	"Muldoon's Star"	Nat Hiken	Harold Flender & Nat Hiken	October 22, 1961
A TV news bulletin announces that Teresa Tangiers, also known as "Tessie the Torso", has walked off the set of her newest movie and can't be found. Later, it's reported that she has been found on a plane that's heading to New York City. Some of the officers from the 53rd Precinct have been assigned to shield Tessie from her fans. Toody is driving her away. She just wants to go somewhere where people will just treat her as one of the family. Toody convinces her to stay at Muldoon's mother's house. At the house, Teresa meets Mrs. Muldoon and her daughters Cathy and Peggy, who also wants to be an actress. Toody tries to tell Muldoon that Teresa is staying at his mother's house, but Muldoon doesn't believe him. It turns out, Muldoon is a huge fan and has a crush on her. Muldoon is in shock when he meets Teresa. Lucille thinks Toody was driving around with a blonde girlfriend, until she meets Teresa. Hoping to not be recognized, Tessie changes her appearance slightly to go to a dance with Toody and Muldoon. But once there, she is disappointed that no one recognizes her. Teresa would like to dance, but Muldoon is a bundle of nerves. Toody asks a young man if he would like to dance with someone. The young man asks Lucille, who turns him down. Now Toody is suddenly very attracted to his wife. After the dance, they all go to an acting improvisation class. There, Teresa is humiliated. Francis convinces her that she is a big star and needs to go back to Hollywood.
7	7	"The Paint Job"	Nat Hiken	Marty Roth & Nat Hiken	October 29, 1961
There is a hit and run stolen car ring operating in town. The 53rd is down to only two patrol cars, so Toody and Muldoon are desperate to keep their beloved Car 54. They are driving so slow that traffic is backing up behind them. They pull over a car that is weaving. The woman driver just got her license, so Muldoon decides to let her go. Their car gets damaged when the woman backs her car into theirs. Instead of reporting it to Capt. Block, they decide to have it repaired on the sly. The car thieving ring is using an auto body shop to paint the stolen cars and they then resell them. Al Spencer (Al Lewis), the auto paint & body man, and his partner Lou (Billy Sands) don't like working with the crooks, but they need the money. When Toody and Muldoon pull in the shop, Al thinks they've been caught. It'll take a while to repair the patrol car. Toody suggests taking a similar car that's in the shop and painting it to look like theirs. What they don't know is that the car they borrowed was actually stolen. Toody and Muldoon discover that they are driving a stolen car. Things get confusing when two of the crooks wind up in Car 54. Toody and Muldoon return to the garage just in time to capture the crooks.
8	8	"Love Finds Muldoon"	Nat Hiken	Nat Hiken	November 5, 1961
Lucille wants to take another shot at matchmaking for the bachelor Muldoon. Lucille runs into an old school chum named Bonita Kalsheim (Alice Ghostley). Bonita tells Lucille she never got married. Lucille invites Muldoon over for dinner. Bonita tells Lucille the reason she never got married was because of her obsession with an actor Ramon Novarro. Now she's desperate to get a man. Muldoon is a little upset when he comes to dinner and Bonita is there. Muldoon gets stuck spending many nights with Bonita, Toody and Lucille. Muldoon tells Toody he wants nothing to do with Bonita, but she keeps stalking him everywhere he goes. She even winds up at Muldoon's mother's house. Bonita tells Lucille she can sense that Muldoon doesn't want to be with her. But, when Bonita doesn't show up one night and plays hard to get, Muldoon starts to really miss her. The next few days, Muldoon tries calling Bonita, but she never answers. Muldoon goes to her house, but she pretends there are other men there. Bonita finally agrees to go out with Muldoon and he intends to tell her he would like her to be his girlfriend. But, when Muldoon confronts another man at the restaurant, Bonita says what he did now reminds her of Ramon Novarro and she can never see him again. It turns out the man dated Bonita for three years until one day he did something that reminded her of Ramon Novarro.
9	9	"The Gypsy Curse"	Nat Hiken	Tony Webster & Nat Hiken	November 12, 1961
Mr. Kramer (Maurice Brenner) tells Capt. Block that a gypsy woman stole his wallet. Toody and Muldoon are told to arrest Anna Lupesko (Maureen Stapleton), the gypsy woman. Muldoon and Kramer talk to Anna and she has an answer for everything. Block sends Toody, dressed in civilian clothes and marked money, to trap Anna. Muldoon and Toody catch Anna with the money. She is told to be gone in 24 hours or Block will press charges. Anna puts a curse on Toody where his back will break out in hives and his wife will leave him. Back at the station, Toody is already checking his back every 10 minutes. He believes he's been cursed. Toody works himself up so much, he has a fight with Lucille. Toody calls Muldoon and tells him that Lucille left him to stay with her sister Rose Henderson (Martha Greenhouse). Muldoon comes over and tells Toody there is no curse and he should talk to Lucille. The next day, Muldoon goes to track down Anna. Toody goes to see Professor Griswald, an authority on gypsy counter curses. Toody goes to see Lucille and after initially making up, they get into another fight. Toody and Muldoon track down Anna and tell her the curse came true. Anna says she now has to go straight, because gypsies always tell lies and if it came true, she must not be a real gypsy.
10	10	"Thirty Days Notice"	Nat Hiken	Ben Joelson, Art Baer & Nat Hiken	November 19, 1961
Gunther and Lucille are fed up with their crumbling rent controlled apartment. However, all they had to do to get an upgrade is pay 15 percent more, but cheap Toody won't do it. In a moment of anger, Toody tells Mr. Corfu the landlord (Henry Lascoe) off and gives his 30-day notice. Lucille is upset, but Corfu is thrilled. Toody is having a really hard time finding another place. Toody believes that Corfu will beg them to stay, but then Corfu brings people to look at the place. Muldoon tells Toody to just pay the 15% increase, but Toody thinks a family is already moving in. A crook named Al Cooper (Michael Vale), that Toddy knows, is about to go back to jail. Al claims he's gone straight and is innocent. Toody asks Al if he could sublet Al's apartment. During the trial, at first it doesn't look good for Al. But then Judge Schweitzer (John Alexander) remembers Al and Bernie, his character witness. The two served under Schweitzer in the Army. Now it looks as though Al might get off. Toody doesn't if he's moving or not. Al winds up getting convicted. After Toody moves in, Al's wife returns and backs up his alibi, proving his innocence. The people that took Toody's apartment hate it. Gunther and Lucille move back. Jack Healy as Officer Rodriguez. Ray MacDonnell as Juror.
11	11	"Catch Me on the Paar Show"	Nat Hiken	Terry Ryan & Nat Hiken	November 26, 1961
Toody is laughing at all of Officer Charlie Fleisher's jokes, but none of the other men are. After a chance traffic stop, Toody and Muldoon encounter host Hugh Downs. Gunther tells Hugh he knows a fellow officer that he thinks is funny. Hugh is in a hurry, but Toody holds him up and gets Fleisher to show up. Hugh reluctantly agrees to let Fleisher tell jokes on The Jack Paar Show. Fleisher tells Hugh that Toody is to be his manager. Lucille tells Muldoon that Toody and Fleisher have written their resignations from the police force. Muldoon tries to bring Toody back to reality, but then gets caught up in Toody's hype. It's the night of the show and Hugh introduces Fleisher. Fleisher gets stage fright. So Toody helps him tell the jokes and then winds up taking over. Everyone tells Toody how funny he was, so he lets fame goes to his head. Because he isn't laughing, Toody thinks Muldoon is jealous of him. Fleisher is going to be Toody's manager, but he freezes up when Hugh calls him. Hugh wants Toody back on the show. Muldoon will be Toody's manager. Afraid he doesn't have enough jokes, Toody and Muldoon go around asking people for material. This time on the show, Toody freezes and Muldoon takes over. Shelley Berman as Rabbi Einsenberg. John Gibson as Father Flannagan.
12	12	"The Taming of Lucille"	Al De Caprio	Tony Webster & Nat Hiken	December 3, 1961
Toody makes fun of the men because they're so henpecked. Lucille calls Toody and tells him that he can't go bowling because her sister Rose and her husband Al (Carl Ballantine) are coming over. The men now make fun of Toody. When Rose and Al show up, it's clear that Al is in charge of his household. The next night Toody and Muldoon have to patrol an outdoor performance of Shakespeare's The Taming of the Shrew. Toody musters the courage to become king of his castle after seeing the performance. Meanwhile, Lucille and Rose see a TV program where a domineering wife loses her husband. Lucille vows to be nicer to Toody. Toody thinks she's acting this way now because of his tougher stance. Toody's been staying out late every night. Even the other guys don't stay out as late. After a while, Toody starts to miss the nagging Lucille. Muldoon tells Toody it's all his fault. Muldoon comes up with a plan to make Lucille her old self and it involves Lucille thinking there are other women. Martin E. Brooks as Petrucio. Jane White as Katherine the Shrew.
13	13	"Put It in the Bank"	Al De Caprio	Will Glickman, Sid Zelinka & Nat Hiken	December 10, 1961
The 53rd Precinct's Brotherhood Club is stunned when Gunther Toody is their newly elected treasurer. Muldoon gives Toody the club's hard-earned $836 and is told to put it in the bank. At the bank, Toody runs into Fink Foster who recommends Toody put the money in the stock market. Toody then runs into Tony Shoeshine, who also recommends the stock market. Toody holds an emergency meeting of the Finance Committee. Despite some of the fiscally conservative colleagues objections, the vote carries to invest the money in the market. Toody and Muldoon visit Stockbroker Clark (John C. Becher) to get some advice. Clark recommends investing in International Sulfur. That night, Toody wakes up Muldoon because he's worried about the stock they bought. Toody and Muldoon go to the International Sulfur building to see its president, C.F. Cartwright (John Alexander). Cartwright is impressed that they invested in his company so one day the 53rd can build a Summer Camp for poor children. Word quickly spreads that police went to see Cartwright to possibly arrest him. This causes the company's value to plummet. Toody, Muldoon and some of the men go to see Cartwright. He assures them that the company is fine and they shouldn't worry. The men keep going to see Cartwright and every time the stock drops further. In the end, Cartwright learns it was Toody's constant visits that sent the stock down. He sends Toody a check for $1500 and tells Toody to put the money in the bank. Heywood Hale Broun as Mr. Wayne, Cartwright's assistant. Arthur Anderson as Henry Ford. Note: First appearance of Al Lewis as Officer Leo Schnauser.
14	14	"Get Well, Officer Schnauser"	Al De Caprio	Terry Ryan & Nat Hiken	December 17, 1961
Schnauser is laid up in the hospital, because his foot was run over by a cab. Toody says that all they have left in the Police Get Well Fund is $9.28. The others can't believe that is all they'll be able to give Leo. FBI Agent Cunningham (Frank Marth) tells Capt. Block that they finally have a chance to catch notorious bank robber Charlie Zimmerman, alias "No Face". Cunningham says that one of Block's men went to high school with Charlie. Block is surprised when he learns that Toody is the man. Cunningham gives Toody the only piece of evidence they have, a note Charlie gives the bank tellers. Toody is not to tell anyone about this case. Block wants Toddy to go undercover and check out the local banks. Dressed as a beatnik, Toody cases a bank. Muldoon comes in to get money for Schnauser from the Get Well Fund. Muldoon thinks the beatnik may be No Face. Through a misunderstanding, a panicked bank teller, Miss Berger (Charlotte Rae), thinks Muldoon is an armed robber and gives him a fortune. Muldoon finds out the beatnik is Toody. Muldoon stops by the hospital and gives Schnauser the bag with the money in it. Now the police believe No Face robbed the bank. When Schnauser comes back to the precinct to thank everyone for all the money, they realize what has happened. Billy Sands as a Thief. Dick O'Neill as Bank Security Guard. Bruce Kirby as Officer Kissell.
15	15	"Christmas at the 53rd"	Al De Caprio	Terry Ryan & Nat Hiken	December 24, 1961
It's the annual Christmas Party at the precinct. The kids are running wild, playing in the fingerprint ink, stealing Santa's hair and many other things. But then everyone settles down to watch a talent show. One Gilbert & Sullivan parody features Capt. Block singing with the men backing him up. Officer Charlie Fleischer does a funny bit that shows off a police uniform. Toody then sings "You're Nobody till Somebody Loves You". Leo Schnauser, and some of the men, reminds everyone of the five golden principles of the Police Brotherhood Club. The men get into an argument when they can't agree on the five principles. The club's choral group, The Whip-poor-wills, with Muldoon singing lead, perform another Gilbert & Sullivan parody. Toody's brother-in-law, Al Henderson, performs some magic with his wife Rose. Bonita Kalsheim sings a comedic torch song. To end the evening, Toody and Muldoon sing a duet where they compliment each other. Billie Allen as Mrs. Dave Anderson.
16	16	"The Sacrifice"	Al De Caprio	Tony Webster & Nat Hiken	January 7, 1962
Muldoon may be the precinct's quickest recall of police rules and regulations. Capt. Block asks Muldoon if he wants to take the sergeant's test, but Muldoon says no. Toody tells Muldoon he's always showing off by knowing all those facts. Later while in their patrol car, Toody apologizes for what he said. Toody mentions how much he enjoys police shows on TV. Meanwhile, Lucille has the TV Repairman take the TV tube to be fixed. With no TV to watch, Lucille gives Toody a book to read. Toody believes Muldoon won't take the test because he thinks Muldoon doesn't want to leave him. Something in the book he's reading, gives Toody an idea. Not wanting to hold Muldoon back, Toody starts fights with him and tells him he's afraid to take the test. Toody hopes that Muldoon will have the "I'll Show You" attitude and take the test. The plan backfires when Muldoon starts to believe Toody and loses his confidence. Muldoon speaks to Mr. Benedict (Phil Bruns), a psychology instructor, about whether he should quit the force. Benedict tells Muldoon he should be a bug exterminator. Muldoon pulls over a speeding Motorist (John C. Becher), but doesn't have the confidence to write out the ticket. Capt. Block and Toody find a way to build up Muldoon's confidence. Muldoon then tries to get Toody to take the sergeant's test.
17	17	"Boom, Boom, Boom"	Al De Caprio	Sid Zelinka, Will Glickman & Nat Hiken	January 14, 1962
The boys are attempting to win the barbershop quartet competition for "the old man", Capt. Block. The rules require all 162 quartets to perform the same song. This winds up driving Guest Celebrity Judge Jan Murray (playing himself) to insanity. By the time it's the boys turn to sing, Jan runs out of the room screaming. The boys make it to the finals. Capt. Block tells Toody to make sure Muldoon takes care of his golden voice. Jan happens to hear the boys singing in a room next to his TV rehearsal room. But when he goes to catch them, they have already left. Jan finally goes to Dr. Strum (Leon Janney) about the singing he keeps hearing. The Butcher Bandit robs Katz the Butcher's (Gerald Hiken) store. Toody and Muldoon investigate and Muldoon gets locked in the ice box. Toody leaves with Katz and his wife, not realizing that Muldoon isn't with him. Block and Toody finally figure out where Muldoon is. They take Muldoon to the hospital and learn that he'll be alright. What they don't know is that Jan is in the next room. Block asks Muldoon to check his voice and when he starts singing, Jan starts screaming from the next room. Toody and the men go to get Muldoon out of the hospital. There's a mix-up and they almost take Jan. The boys finally make it to the contest and wind up winning. Toni Darnay as Nurse. Arthur Anderson as Boden.
18	18	"Toody & Muldoon Crack Down"	Al De Caprio	Terry Ryan & Nat Hiken	January 21, 1962
Deputy Chief Inspector Corrigan drives through Toody & Muldoon's sector and he becomes so angered by the scores of violations he sees. He gives Capt. Block 24 hours to straighten out all the violations and issue summons. Block is furious with Toody and Muldoon and tells them there are 107 violations in their sector. Block sends them back out to fix things. Meanwhile, Corrigan is determined to get rid of Toody and Muldoon to set an example. Toody and Muldoon decide they have been too soft on their sector. At the first stop, Grocer Callucci and his wife are so nice, Muldoon can't give out a summons. This continues at each stop. Meanwhile, Corrigan is looking into the records of Toody and Muldoon and finds that there are no major crimes in the area the boys cover. Toody and Muldoon get back to the station. Block learns that they didn't give out one summons. Block is going to transfer them to foot patrol. Corrigan talks to many of the merchants and finds out how much Toody and Muldoon actually do for the sector. Corrigan congratulates Block and wants Toody and Muldoon to keep doing what they've been doing. Heywood Hale Broun as Data Gathering Police Officer. Mildred Clinton as Mrs. Colby. Jake LaMotta as Seaman.
19	19	"Toody's Paradise"	Al De Caprio	Will Glickman, Sid Zelinka & Nat Hiken	January 28, 1962
Toody and Lucille go to see a movie about a guy with two wives. Lucille tells Toody that he has no romance left in him. Toody tells Muldoon that he's in a rut and would like to do something to show Lucille he's still exciting. Schnauser has to go to his sister's wedding, so he can't go on the special assignment Capt. Block would like him to. Toody goes on an undercover detail in Brooklyn with Officer O'Brian (Elisabeth Fraser) as his wife and a small boy (Paul O'Keefe) as his child. Lucille's friend Bertha sees Toody sitting in a park with O'Brian and calls Lucille to tell her. Lucille just laughs it off. But, when Lucille and her sister Rose see him with his fictitious family, it leads Lucille to believe he has two families. Lucille leaves Toody a note saying she will find happiness with someone else. She then goes to talk to Capt. Block and tells him what she saw. Block wants to take Lucille for some coffee. Toody and Muldoon see Block and Lucille leave the station and Block is carrying suitcases. Toody now thinks Block is the other man. Toody and Muldoon go to tell Block's wife, Elsie. Toody calls Rose and she says they saw him in the park with his family. Several other misunderstandings occur, but things get straightened out when Toody brings O'Brian around to explain things.
20	20	"How High Is Up?"	Al De Caprio	Tony Webster & Nat Hiken	February 4, 1962
Police Commissioner Harper (Sorrell Booke) starts a crackdown on police physical fitness. All the men at the 53rd are panicking. Muldoon discovers he's grown an inch to 6-foot-seven, putting him one inch over the police regulation. Muldoon wants to do what he can to try to appear shorter, so he won't be fired. Capt. Block has the men come around for an inspection and tells them they will need to get in shape. Schnauser tells Muldoon that people always see him as tall because he's around short Toody. Muldoon gets Toody to wear elevator shoes. Block tells Muldoon that he's heard Commissioner Harper is coming to the Brotherhood Club dance that night to look over the men. When Block sees Toody, he thinks he's shrinking. Muldoon decides he shouldn't go to the dance, so he wants Toody to take over as chairman. Block insists that Muldoon be at the dance. Muldoon's mother wants him to take Melinda Walsh (Shari Lewis) to the dance. Muldoon meets Melinda's parents, who are as tall as he is, so he believes there won't be a problem. When he picks Melinda up and sees that she is quite short, Muldoon makes up an excuse for not going to the dance. Regretting what he did, Muldoon takes Melinda to the dance, even if it means he might lose his job. At the dance, Muldoon meets Commissioner Harper, who is very short, but has a very tall wife. Harper thanks Muldoon because now he can dance with his wife and not feel awkward.
21	21	"Toody and the Art World"	Al De Caprio	Nat Hiken	February 11, 1962
Toody is selling tickets for the 53rd Precinct's Brotherhood Club's raffle. Toody has one ticket left to sell. He gets Schnauser, who claims he has no luck and never wins anything, to buy it. Toody and Muldoon are to serve an eviction notice to artist Karpathia (Severn Darden). Toody is the only person who can apparently appreciate Karpathia's abstract masterpiece, "Lower Manhattan at Sunset (from the New Jersey Side)". Karpathia gives Toody the painting. Toody hangs the painting at home. Lucille thinks it's junk and throws it in the garbage. Toody realizes he forgot to get a prize for the raffle. He finds the painting in the garbage. Toody suggests to Muldoon that the painting could be the prize. Schnauser, who claimed he never won anything, wins the raffle. While he doesn't like the painting, he keeps it anyway. Gordon Pennington (Shepperd Strudwick), the Director of an Abstract Art Museum, asks Lucille if he can borrow the painting for an exhibit. He tells her it's worth $25,000. Lucille tells Toody, who then calls Schnauser. Toody, Muldoon and Schnauser bring what they think is the painting to the exhibit. But turns out to be a wedding picture of Schnauser and his wife Sylvia (Charlotte Rae). When Schnauser asks Sylvia, who never throws anything away, where the painting is, she says she threw it away. Later, Toody and Karpathia are able to donate something else to the world of art.
22	22	"What Happened to Thursday?"	Al De Caprio	Tony Webster & Nat Hiken	February 18, 1962
Every Thursday night, at 11 p.m. on the dot, Leo Schnauser and his wife Sylvia get into a loud argument. Toody and Muldoon have to come by and stop the shouting before the neighbors start calling the cops. And they get into fights about the silliest things. Just when Toody and Muldoon think Leo and Sylvia have made up, they start fighting again. The next day Capt. Block is furious because of the complaints about the Schnausers. He's also mad that Toody and Muldoon have been covering it up. Next time it happens, Block wants them to arrest Schnauser. Schnauser can't understand why six nights a week he and Sylvia are like love birds and then come Thursday they fight. Toody suggests a plan to Muldoon. Muldoon and Toody try to convince Leo, along with some of the other men, that Thursday's actually Friday. This leads to a lot confusion. Lucille, Rose and Sylvia are talking about a movie they just saw, Gaslight. A happy Leo goes home and tells Sylvia that they made it through a Thursday without fighting. Thinking that Leo is trying to gaslight her, Sylvia starts an argument. Jim Boles as First Man.
23	23	"How Smart Can You Get?"	Al De Caprio	Story by : Tony Webster & Nat Hiken; Teleplay by : Tony Webster	February 25, 1962
Lt. Cushman (Nicholas Saunders) comes to the precinct with four rookies. The four rookies, who are from the top of the class, will get to learn while riding with veteran cops. Block is surprised when Reginald Corrigan, a genius rookie officer, is assigned to ride with Toody and Muldoon. Block tries to talk Cushman into placing Corrigan with someone else. Cushman believes Muldoon to be quite smart and he thinks Muldoon and Corrigan would make a good team. Block tells Toody and Muldoon about Corrigan. Toody looks forward to having someone else to talk to, while Muldoon thinks Corrigan will just get in the way. But, Corrigan proves a genuinely stimulating conversationalist for Muldoon. Muldoon can't go bowling with Toody as he's spending the evening with Corrigan. Lucille is surprised when Toody doesn't go bowling and wants to read a book instead. The next day, Toody tries to join Muldoon and Corrigan's conversations, but he has no luck. After a week, Toody, feeling he can't compete, requests a new partner. He is then teamed up with Schnauser. But, Toody can't deal with Schnauser's constant talking and Muldoon's police work is suffering because of his conversations with Corrigan. Muldoon begs Block to have Corrigan teamed up with someone else. The Car 54 team gets reunited. Richard Roat as Garfield. Note: In 1997, TV Guide ranked this episode No. 61 on its list of the 100 Greatest Episodes.
24	24	"Today I Am a Man"	Al De Caprio	Nat Hiken & Terry Ryan	March 4, 1962
Everyone at the precinct keeps asking Muldoon to watch over various women because they know he is not a ladies man and they can trust him. He's tired of being thought of as a mama's boy. Muldoon tells the men he can't help them on Saturday night because he has a date. The men don't believe him. Muldoon tells his mother that he doesn't know what he's going to do as he was bluffing about the date. Muldoon does have the number from a woman in his stamp club. But when she answers the phone, he panics and hangs up. Muldoon decides to still fake it for the men. He tells them he's taking his date to the Chi Chi Club. His bluff is called by Officer O'Hara and Officer Sanders (Bob Hastings), who show up at the club. Muldoon sits down at a table with Mr. and Mrs. Parker (Howard Freeman and Ruth White), two old folks with their plain daughter Priscilla. Muldoon pretends to be with them but they see his gun and holster and are scared. The officers see Muldoon with the daughter. They think he's doing alright and leave. Nicholson and Schnauser then show up. The Parker's think Muldoon's a gangster and the cops outside are there to catch him. Knowing that his fellow officers are still watching him, Muldoon goes to the home of the Parkers with Priscilla. The Parker's think he's using them as a shield. Muldoon decides to face the truth and go out and confess to the officers. Priscilla grabs Muldoon and says she wants to go with him. She won't let him go and says she's his. The officers have to help him get out of the house and now believe he is quite the ladies man. Muldoon sees Priscilla several more times. Nicholas Colasanto as Marty.
25	25	"No More Pickpockets"	Al De Caprio	Tony Webster & Nat Hiken	March 11, 1962
Toody and Muldoon feel bad because they were the only ones who weren't awarded a citation. Capt. Block mentions that they need volunteers to go undercover to spot pickpockets at Yankee Stadium during the World's Series. Toody volunteers and Block reluctantly accepts. Block then tells Muldoon he has to give up his day off to go with Toody. At the game, Toody arrests Benny (Wally Cox), a pickpocket who always wanted to be a cop. The van comes to take Benny away. Benny shows the Van Police Officer (Dana Elcar) Toody's ID, which he had just lifted, and Toody gets arrested. Benny goes on to make many more arrests. Chief Collins from headquarters calls Capt. Block to tell him what a great job Toody is doing rounding up pickpockets. At the police station, Toody tries to tell the Door Guard Police Officer (Rex Everhart) that he's really a cop. Toody calls Muldoon to come and vouch for him. While viewing all the men "Toody" arrested, Block sees the real Toody in the group. Block and Toody have to explain to Collins about Benny. Muldoon comes to the station to help Toody. While there, one of the pickpockets takes his ID. A Hot Dog Man (Billy Sands) from the game sees Muldoon and thinks he's the guy that stole his money. Because Muldoon has no ID, he is taken into custody. Block gets the two released. Benny is brought in and he thanks the officers for letting him prove what a good cop he would have been. He then proceeds to steal Capt. Block's ID. John C. Becher as The Father. Herb Voland as Lineup Sergeant.
26	26	"The Beast Who Walked the Bronx"	Al De Caprio	Terry Ryan & Nat Hiken	March 18, 1962
Inspector Kerman comes by the precinct and witnesses Capt. Block yelling at his men. Kerman orders Block to take a two week vacation. Schnauser thinks they're bringing in another Captain to straighten the place out. As no one else is available, Capt. Burkholtz (Howard Freeman) is the only choice to sub for Capt. Block. He has been in Lost & Found for 25 years due to his inability to discipline anyone. While dropping off Block's vacation papers, Toody misunderstands something he and Muldoon hear about Burkholtz. Toody now thinks the precinct could be getting someone very strict. Thanks to a particularly active rumor mill of fragmented information, everyone believes Burkholtz's absence from active duty is because he was too tough. The men of the 53rd now fear the second coming of Hitler as their temporary commander. Burkholtz arrives and is quite pleasant. The men believe his is just toying with them. Block comes by the precinct to check on things and sees everyone cleaning and straightening things up, fearful of the wrath of Burkholtz. Burkholtz tells Block and Kerman that the men come in on their days off and sometimes work through the night. A misunderstanding leads the men to think that Burkholtz fed Kissel to his fish. Burkholtz is assigned to another precinct and Block comes back. Everyone goes back to their former slacking off ways. Heywood Hale Broun as Burkholtz's assistant. Arthur Anderson as Carter. Maurice Brenner as Officer Kramer.
27	27	"The Courtship of Sylvia Schnauser"	Al De Caprio	Tony Webster	March 25, 1962
After going to a beautiful wedding and catching the bouquet right afterward, Sylvia Schnauser gets it in her head that she wants the fancy marriage she never had. Sylvia had her wedding in city hall on her lunch hour and Leo was in the Army and sent overseas the next day. Until she gets her big wedding, Sylvia acts like the maid of the house and not a wife. Schnauser complains to Toddy and Muldoon about the way Sylvia is acting. Schnauser asks Muldoon to talk to her. Toddy and Muldoon go to see Sylvia and she's even dressed like a maid. Sylvia won't listen to them. Toody thinks Sylvia will listen to Lucille. Toody and Lucille try to talk Sylvia out of the wedding idea, but wind up agreeing to be acting Father of the bride and Matron of honor. When Leo still refuses to have the big wedding, Sylvia moves in with the Toodys. Sylvia has been with the Toodys for a week now. Toody tells Schnauser that Sylvia has been going out every evening and is seeing a man named Sam. Schnauser arrives at Toody's home with flowers and candy. Leo finally caves in and agrees to the large wedding. Everyone is at the wedding hall when Toody gets a call from Leo. Leo and Sylvia are at city hall and got married there. Toody and Lucille get re-married at the wedding hall. Billie Allen as Mrs. Anderson. John Gibson as Judge.
28	28	"The Auction"	Al De Caprio	Story by : Sid Zelinka and Will Glickman; Teleplay by : Sid Zelinka, Will Glickman & Nat Hiken	April 1, 1962
The boys of the 53rd Precinct are discussing what to get Capt. Block for his 25th wedding anniversary. Schnauser suggests a silver cheese knife because 25 is the silver anniversary. Toody thinks it's a stupid idea. The discussion digresses into an argument over where the Christmas party will be held when Block walks into the room. When Toody and Muldoon come over to Block's house to pick up some files, the Captain shows them his antique collection. He says he would love to have a matching Aleutian Ceremonial Chair to complete his set. Block tracked down the other chair to an owner in Staton Island. The owner wouldn't sell it to Block. Toody thinks that instead of the cheese knife, they should get Block an antique. Toody and Muldoon go to various antique shops, but everything is so expensive. Toody sees the other Aleutian Ceremonial Chair at an auction house. At the auction, many of the other people believe that the items might be stolen because there are police officers in the crowd. Schnauser winds up buying stuff they didn't need, because no one else will bid. Though it takes some doing, Toody finally wins the chair. The Captain tells the boys he sold all his antiques to the auction house, including the chair, to buy his wife a piano. When the boys bring the chair back to the auction house, they see another chair there. It turns out Mrs. Block was able to buy the other chair from its owner. But, when she found out her husband sold his, she brought that chair to the auction house. The Captain will now get his two chairs. Paul Lipson as Pete the Auctioneer.
29	29	"Quiet! We're Thinking"	Al De Caprio	Terry Ryan	April 8, 1962
Lieutenant L. Kogan (Frank Campanella) is at the 53rd looking for possible detective material. He brought with him several unsolves cases. Kogan mentions an unsolved department store burglary. Toody and Muldoon volunteer to do detective work for Block as that store is in their sector. Gunther and Lucille's 11-year-old nephew Marvin (Paul O'Keefe) is in New York for a Boy Scout event. Without Toody and Muldoon even realizing it, Marvin helps them crack the department store case. Kogan wants to give Toody and Muldoon a pawn shop case. Once again Marvin helps them solve the case without them knowing. Chief McCoy comes by to congratulate Kogan about Toody and Muldoon's work. The boys are assigned a really tough case about the midtown loft robberies. Wanting quiet to be able to concentrate, Toody has Marvin sent to Lucille's sister Rose's house. When they can't come up with anything, Toody and Muldoon figure out it was Marvin who came up with the ideas. Without Al knowing it, Marvin helps him with a business problem. Toody and Muldoon come by and pick up Marvin. Al realizes it was Marvin who came up with the ideas. Al goes to Toody's house and they fight over Marvin. Marvin and some of his scout buddies solve the loft robberies case. Jake LaMotta as Thug.
30	30	"I Love Lucille"	Al De Caprio	Tony Webster & Nat Hiken	April 22, 1962
Everytime they go out to a party, Toody always dances with every other woman there and ignores Lucille. Lucille also gets upset when Toody can't tell her the color of her eyes. Lucille hopes a change in hair color gets Toody to pay her more attention, so she goes to Julius the Beautician (Phil Leeds). Julius is afraid of the outcome, as Lucille insisted on a bold change. Despite her outrageously blonde hair and sexy outfit, Toody doesn't notice. It's not until he's out bowling later and a beautiful blonde walks by, that it hits Toody about Lucille's hair. Toody races home and tells Lucille how much he loves the blonde hair. Toody dreams that famous Hollywood producer J. J. Jones (Erik Rhodes) wants to make Lucille famous. She becomes such a big star that she gets a Mexican divorce from Toody. Muldoon now thinks he has a chance with Lucille. When he wakes up, Toody is afraid he will lose Lucille because she is so beautiful. The boys think Toody is chasing after the blonde woman from the bowling alley. Toody misunderstands and thinks everyone is after his wife. Muldoon decides he needs to talk to Lucille about the blonde woman. Muldoon is surprised when he sees Lucille's hair. She tells him she regrets doing it because now she is a prisoner of love. Muldoon convinces Lucille to dye her hair back and says he'll drive her to the beauty shop. Toody thinks the two are running off together. After she changes her hair, things get back to normal. Bob Kaliban as Reporter.

=== Season 2 (1962–63) ===
No. overall	No. in season	Title	Directed by	Written by	Original release date
31	1	"Hail to the Chief"	Nat Hiken	Tony Webster	September 16, 1962
Commissioner Brady is speaking with Secret Service Agents, Cordner (Simon Oakland) and Hollander (Jay Jostyn). They are discussing the route President Kennedy will take to the U.N. Because their partnership has lasted so long, Brady suggests Toody and Muldoon drive the President. Brady calls Capt. Block to tell him two of his men will drive the President. Block is thrilled until he hears it's Toody and Muldoon. Brady says nothing must go wrong. As the President is Muldoon's hero, he is incapacitated every time he hears the President's name. Cordner does a ride-along with Toody and Muldoon to check them out. Toody keeps talking so that hopefully Cordner won't be able to mention the President. Muldoon gets carsick because Cordner starts to constantly mention the President. No one believes Cordner when he tells them about Muldoon. Pretending that Schnauser gets car sick, the boys consult a Doctor (Jeremiah Morris) on how to prevent it. The Doctor recommends some tranquilizers. During the next ride-along with Cordner, Muldoon takes so many tranquilizers, he starts to fall asleep at the wheel. Again no one believes Cordner and Hollander thinks he should be transferred to lighter duty. This time, the Doctor recommends anti-depressants. Now Muldoon laughs at everything. The Secret Service finds someone else to drive the President. Billy Sands as Quackenbush - the Man Who Thinks He Can Fly. Frederick O'Neal as Officer Wallace. Mel Stewart as Police Officer.
32	2	"One Sleepy People"	Nat Hiken	Terry Ryan	September 23, 1962
Muldoon's house is being painted, so he's spending a couple weeks at Toody's place. Schnauser complains that he and his partner Ed Nicholson (Hank Garrett) aren't that close. At Toody's house, Muldoon pretends to flirt with Lucille. A steamy movie on TV misleads Muldoon and Lucille into thinking that each has a crush on the other. Lucille and Muldoon try to avoid being alone together. Lucille tells Sylvia Schnauser that Francis is in love with her. While on patrol, Muldoon tries to tell Toody that Lucille is in love with him. Toody thinks he's talking about Sylvia and Nicholson. Muldoon then flat out says that Lucille is in love with him, but Toody falls asleep and doesn't hear him. At the precinct, Toody tells Nicholson to stay away from Sylvia. Francis convinces Schnauser to let him stay at his house, not knowing that Sylvia has asked Lucille to stay there as well. Nicholson comes by because Schnauser had earlier invited him over. Muldoon sees Lucille and runs out of Schnauser's house. Muldoon goes back to Toody's house. After being kicked out by Sylvia, Lucille comes home. After continually running into each other, things finally do get straightened out. Patricia Cutts as Pamela, an actress on TV. Marie Wallace as Sheila, Nicholson's date. Dick Powell as himself on a TV show. Mel Stewart as Police Dispatcher. Patrick Horgan as Ashley.
33	3	"A Man Is Not an Ox"	Nat Hiken	Billy Friedberg & Nat Hiken	September 30, 1962
It seems that Toody and Muldoon are always sick at the same time. Dr. Meisner (Ned Wertimer) sees similarities between two oxen yoked together for 10 years that mimicked each others movements and Car 54's occupants. After he hears Meisner's theory, Dr. O.J. Metz gives him permission to observe Toody and Muldoon. When Meisner rides along with the two, they seem to do everything in sync. Meanwhile, Schnauser is having a hard time organizing the Brotherhood Club's banquet. Meisner is examining Capt. Block as an excuse to be in the men's locker room so he can continue to observe Toody and Muldoon. Toody, and then Muldoon, stumble on Meisner's notes about them. They each decide separately to act out-of-sync. But, no matter how much they try to act differently, they keep doing similar things. Block is getting worried because Meisner keeps examining him. Meisner finally tells Muldoon, and then Toody, his theory. Schnauser continues to have problems planning the banquet. No matter how hard they try, Toody and Muldoon wind up doing the same things. Meisner and Metz show up at the precinct and Block thinks he's in for bad news. Block is relieved when he learns he's fine and the doctor's are there because of Toody and Muldoon. Meisner tells Block that Toody and Muldoon have to split up. Metz believes the best way to do this is to get Muldoon married. But the girl that Muldoon is set up with looks exactly like Lucille.
34	4	"Schnauser's Last Ride"	Nat Hiken	Tony Webster	October 7, 1962
The boys recount what happened when Schnauser was taken off his mounted police route and had to retire his horse Sally. It was 10 years ago that Deputy Commissioner Connors (John C. Becher) disbanded the mounted police and brought Schnauser to the 53rd Precinct. Connors suggests to Capt. Block that Schnauser pick his own partner as a way to help him adjust. Schnauser picks Muldoon because he has Sally's eyes. The first day doesn't go well. Connors tells Muldoon that Schnauser was with Sally for 12 years and it'll will take him some time to get used to being in a car. Connors decides to team Schnauser up with someone less intelligent. Toody gets picked. After a couple days, Toody starts acting like a horse. Block puts Toody back with Muldoon. Once Schnauser realizes what he was doing to Toody, he thinks it's best if he resigns from the force. Muldoon suggests to Block and Connors that they put Schnauser back on his old beat. Toody and Muldoon are to drive Schnauser to his old beat. For some reason Schnauser can't remember where it is. Meanwhile, a man is taking Sally for a ride from the Midtown Riding Academy. Sally winds up taking the man to a place where some gambling is going on. The man stays there and Sally wanders off. Sally gets involved in a book-making crime wave. With Sally's help, the crooks are captured.
35	5	"Toody & Muldoon Sing Along with Mitch"	Nat Hiken	Buddy Arnold & Ben Joelson	October 14, 1962
Mitch Miller will be holding auditions for municipal workers for his tv show. At the audition, Capt. Block comes by with the 53rd Precinct Whippoorwills. Toody is surprised Mitch has never heard of his famous family, the Singing Toodys. The Whippoorwills are made up of Officers Toody, Muldoon, Wallace and Schnauser. When they audition for Mitch, it's clear which of the four is the problem, but who will tell Toody? Block has no luck trying to find another bass voice to take over for Toody. While Toddy's complaining in the locker room how Mitch Miller doesn't know what he's doing, Block and the men hear a beautiful bass voice singing in the shower. But none of them have the heart to kick Toody out. Toody keeps talking about how friends should stick together and that's more important than being on Mitch Miller's show. Toody catches the others practicing and realizes it was him that caused the group to fail. Toody goes to his Uncle Igor Toody (George S. Irving) to ask him why he is the only Toody with a bad voice. Igor tells him all the Toodys had a bad voice until they had their tonsils out. Toody has the operation. Block and the group come to see him. Muldoon tells Toody that they called off the audition with Mitch Miller. Igor shows up and tells the men that Toody's voice will be beautiful now. They go to set up the audition again. Toody dreams that he now has a great tenor voice and Muldoon goes and hangs himself. Toody has been out of the hospital for 10 days and hasn't spoken a word. The audition is that evening. It turns out that Toddy's singing voice is still bad.
36	6	"Occupancy, August 1st"	Nat Hiken	Gary Belkin	October 21, 1962
The Bronxville Village housing development isn't finished being built yet. Gunderson (Dana Elcar), the Construction Boss, sees a woman up in one of the apartments. He calls the Commissioner (John Alexander) to let him know. Capt. Block comes by with Toody and Muldoon. Toody and Muldoon discover that the woman is Mrs. Rachel Bronson (Molly Picon). She says she has a lease that says she can move in on Aug. 1st, which it is. Muldoon tries to explain that the building is nowhere near finished. No matter who they send, everyone winds up helping Mrs. Bronson stay. Health Commissioner Herbert Willoughby (Heywood Hale Broun) tells the Commissioner he can have Rachel out in 24 hours by condemning the building. That plan is dismissed. The Commissioner sends Dr. Michaels (Howard Freeman), a psychiatrist, to talk to Rachel. Michaels winds up telling Rachel his family problems. The Commissioner then goes to talk to Rachel. Mrs. Bronson says that if they finish her apartment, she will go on vacation and let them finish the building. Hilton Harlow (Charles Nelson Reilly), the architect, comes by to work on the apartment. But, Mrs. Bronson wants the apartment be old fashioned, not the new modern unit it was going to be. Rachel gets what she wants and the whole building winds up with an old look to it. Michael Conrad as the Construction Foreman.
37	7	"Remember St. Petersburg"	Nat Hiken	Tony Webster	October 28, 1962
Madame Sonya, part of a fortune-telling scam ring, is trying to scam some money from customer Alvin Brooks (Maurice Brenner). But he has no money. The Scam Ring Leader (Paul Lipson) sees an article in the paper about a Count getting married for the 8th time. He thinks they should try to scam the Count. They mistake Schnauser as the Count. Sonya calls Sylvia and tells her that Leo's first wife Celeste is trying to reach her from the beyond. Sylvia brings up the other wife to Leo and he swears he was never married before. The next day, Muldoon wonders where Sylvia could've gotten the idea about another wife. Muldoon suggests that Sylvia go see psychiatrist Dr. Mitchell (Don Keefer). Sylvia goes to see Madame Sonya and during a seance is told that Leo is a Russian Count and that she is a Countess. Schnauser comes home and Sylvia is dressed as a Countess. Alvin Brooks reports Madame Sonya to Capt. Block. Block wants Toody to go undercover and check out the fortune teller. Leo brings Dr. Mitchell over to observe Sylvia, but the doctor begins to think that Leo is crazy. Another mistake has the con artists convincing Toody that he's royalty, and Leo's his brother. Dr. Mitchell tells Block what he thinks about Schnauser and asks him to play along. Toody talks to Schnauser and they both start to believe they are royalty. Larry Storch as Pinky, part of the scam ring.
38	8	"That's Show Business"	Nat Hiken	Gary Belkin	November 4, 1962
While on patrol, Toody and Muldoon get a radio call about a disturbance at Muldoon's house. When they arrive, there is a lot of screaming coming from inside. It turns out it was Muldoon's sister Peggy rehearsing a part for a Broadway show. She has to go to the producer's Park Ave. apartment that night to audition. Muldoon doesn't want her going alone. Toody and Muldoon put on tuxedos and go to the apartment. There they find there are many potential investors for the Fenwick production of "Waiting for Wednesday". Toody gets caught up in the excitement and pledges $2000. He needs to have the money by the next afternoon. Railroad President Van Wyck (House Jameson) offers Toody $6000 for his pledge, because he has invested in everyone of Fenwick's productions. When Capt. Block hears this, he wants the boys of the 53rd Precinct to invest in Toody's pledge. Later they learn from the Commissioner that it's a gritty play about police brutality and the names of all the investors will be revealed. The Commissioner tells Robin Stuart (David Hurst), the author of the play, that there is no police brutality anymore. When Stuart and the Commissioner visit the 53rd, the men are not at their best and it is utter chaos. Things do get straightened out and Stuart wants to write a musical about the policeman. Larry Storch as Charlie the Drunk. Mel Stewart as Officer - Dispatcher.
39	9	"Toody Undercover"	Nat Hiken	Terry Ryan	November 11, 1962
There are some hoods from Kansas City in town that the cops would like to arrest. Capt. Block is picking out some men for when they're ready to move in on the gang. Block picks everyone but Toody. Toody just happens to talk to one of the hoods, Patsy Peru (George Mathews) and he thinks Toody is one of them. Toody thinks Patsy is a cop. Some cops that are keeping an eye on the hoods take a picture of Patsy and Toddy. Block has no choice but to put Toody undercover as part of the mob ring. Toddy's intimate knowledge of the area (bank layouts, burglar alarms & patrolmen habits) makes him a better crook than cop. Toddy calls Block and tells him where the gang's next job will be. At the warehouse, the crooks keep complimenting Toody and he gets swell-headed. When Toody sees Block there, he alerts the crooks. Toody helps them escape. The next day, Toody tells Block and Inspector Henderson (Barnard Hughes) that he just got carried away when the crooks called him chief. The Boss, Biggy Bigelow (Bruce Gordon), arrives and wants to rob a certain bank. Toody gives Biggy updated information about the bank and Biggy thinks Toody is a genius. Biggy wants Toody to pick the bank. Toody mixes up the bank that Block told him to have the crooks rob. The crooks clean out the bank. Because the hoods believe Toody is such a master mind, they even agree to turn themselves in as part of a plan to rob Fort Knox. Barney Martin as Fats Borderman. Jane Rose as Boarding House Maid.
40	10	"I Hate Captain Block"	Stanley Prager	Ben Joelson & Buddy Arnold	November 18, 1962
Capt. Block has a parrot that he cares for very much. He's had it 15 years, but can't get it to talk. Tired of always taking the parrot with on vacation, Claire Block insists they leave the parrot behind. Claire tells Block to leave the bird with someone who talks a lot. Toody is chosen to take care of Bibi the parrot and he decides to teach it to talk. Lucille is not happy about having Bibi in the house. Toody tries everything to get Bibi to talk. Toody and Muldoon go to the pet store. To get a bird to talk, the Owner mentions a record that repeats phrases. Lucille tells Toody that Muldoon and a girl and the Schnausers are coming over to play bridge. They arrive and Muldoon introduces his cousin, Vivian Hansen. While playing bridge, everyone starts repeating the phrases from the record. It gets to be too much and the guests leave early. Lucille breaks the record. Toody begins to regret taking the bird in and he says he hates Captain Block in front of the bird. Now the parrot begins repeating "I hate Capt. Block". Muldoon's idea to trade Bibi with another bird doesn't pan out. Toody and Muldoon take Bibi to the pet shop to ask the owner's advice. All the birds in the store wind up saying "I hate Capt. Block". When Block picks up the bird, it starts repeating the phrases from the record. Envious that Toody got the bird to talk, Block says he hates Gunther Toody. Guess what the bird starts saying now? Heywood Hale Broun as Thompson, a Pet Store Customer. James Karen as a Bird Owner.
41	11	"A Star Is Born in the Bronx"	Stanley Prager	Terry Ryan	November 25, 1962
The 53rd precinct drama club is presenting a play by Muldoon. Muldoon is directing a rehearsal. Lucille and Sylvia are competing to be the leading lady in the play. Leo tells Sylvia she is too fat to play the part. The men try to tell Lucille that she's too short for the part. Sylvia asks Muldoon to give her two weeks. She will go on a diet and lose the weight. Lucille tells Toody that Sylvia will never be able to stay on the diet. While at the grocery store, Sylvia is filmed taste testing Dixie Dimple cookies. Colonel Culpepper (Kenny Delmar), the owner of Dixie Dimple, sees the film and wants to use Sylvia to plug his cookies. Mr. Babcock (John Gibson) tells Advertising Agency Executive Dutton (David Doyle) that he doesn't know who the woman is. She fainted before he could get her to sign a release. Babcock is able to track Sylvia down. Sylvia makes some outrageous demands before she'll sign a contract. Schnauser tells Babcock that he'll talk to Sylvia and he should come back the next day. Toody, Muldoon and Lucille try to talk Sylvia into signing. But, Sylvia lets stardom go to her head. Babcock and Dutton come by. Because they need the Dixie Dimple account, they agree to Sylvia's outrageous demands. Her first commercial for Dixie Dimple, directed by Muldoon, is a disaster. Lu Leonard as a Shopper. Bill Wendell as Dixie Dimple Commercial Announcer.
42	12	"Pretzel Mary"	Nat Hiken	Story by : Art Baer; Teleplay by : Gary Belkin & Art Baer	December 2, 1962
Toody and Muldoon want the men to chip in to get Charlie the drunk started in a business. The men recall all the other businesses they tried to set him up with where he found ways to keep drinking. Charlie's conversation returns to drinking and he leaves. Toody and Muldoon are forced by Capt. Block to crack down on Pretzel Mary, a nuisance peddler selling pretzels in the park without a license. At the police station, Mary causes a scene falsely claiming the police were physically abusing her. To keep her quiet, Block gives her the money to buy a license. Toody and Muldoon take Mary home. When they see her deplorable living conditions, Toody would like to help her. What they don't know is that she is actually an extremely wealthy woman. She stores all her cash in the old furniture. Toody gets the men to replace all of Mary's furniture with new pieces. Block assembles the men and tells them they must find the gang that stole Mary's million dollars. Block tells them that Mary had the money stuffed in her furniture. The men can't bring themselves to tell Block they were the ones who replaced the furniture. As they track down the furniture, Mary secretly follows them each step of the way. They find the furniture, but before they can move them, Mary takes the money out. She then puts the money in the new furniture at her house. The boys swap her old furniture for the new ones. Mary eventually gets her money back and goes back to selling pretzels. Ossie Davis as Officer Omar Anderson. Melville Ruick as Maxwell. Paul Lipson as Junk Man.
43	13	"142 Tickets on the Aisle"	Stanley Prager	Tony Webster	December 9, 1962
The Brotherhood Club and their wives discuss where to spend their annual get-together. They decide to see a clean and uplifting Broadway show. They pick several shows but can't get into any of them as they are all sold out well in advance. The boys finally hear about "Little Miss Pioneer" having tickets available. It's a clean and uplifting Broadway Western that is bombing. Because it's not on the list of suggested plays, Toody doesn't think they should by the tickets. The Producer says that Toody, Muldoon and Schnauser should view part of the play. The boys are not that impressed but will bring it up to the Brotherhood Club. At the Club meeting, an argument starts over whether to see the play or not. But when word gets around that some policeman were checking out the play, rumors spread that it isn't so wholesome. Block gets a call from the Commissioner and is told that even if the play is indecent, the police can't shut it down. Block tells the club meeting this and now the women don't want to see it. The Producer agrees to let the wives meet some of the cast members. People witness the police loading the cast members into a police van. More rumors spread and now everyone wants to see the show. Tickets are sold out way in advance and the Brotherhood Club can't get any. Matt Crowley as City Editor Donovan. Betty Garde as Clarissa Hawthorne, one of the play's cast. Joe Silver as Newstand Customer. Janis Hansen Johnny Scout / Little Miss Pioneer.
44	14	"Stop Thief"	Stanley Prager	Tony Webster	December 16, 1962
An actor dressed as a police inspector mistakenly goes to the 53rd thinking that's where they're filming a TV show. The actor learns it was the 31st precinct he was supposed to go to. While waiting to be picked up, the actor asks Capt. Block to help him rehearse his part. After overhearing Block rehearsing with the actor in his office, Toody and Muldoon think he's a kleptomaniac. Block goes shopping for Christmas gifts for the men in the precinct. Toody and Muldoon see him coming back with the presents and think he stole them. While he's out of his office, they take the presents to return them. Block tells Schnauser about the missing presents. The Captain now believes one of his men is a thief. The department store was too crowded, so Toody and Muldoon bring the presents to Toody's house. Toody and Muldoon warn the men there may be a crook in the precinct. The men see Schnauser searching the lockers and think he's the crook. Block buys more presents and Toody and Muldoon take them as well. Nicholson tells Toody and Muldoon that Schnauser is a kleptomaniac. They tell him that Block is one as well. Thinking Block started stealing things because he had a deprived childhood, they fill his office with toys. The boys overhear Block talking about furniture he is picking up for his wife. They come and take the furniture out of his house. When Toody and Muldoon see the TV show, they realize they made a mistake. The men are able to make things right by the end of Christmas Eve. Roger C. Carmel as Mr. Cochran, Director. Dan Frazer as Mr. Cochran's assistant.
45	15	"Je t'adore Muldoon"	Stanley Prager	Ben Joelson	December 30, 1962
Muldoon has been picked to be king of the Brotherhood Club Mardi Gras Ball. What girl-shy Francis doesn't know is that as king he has to take Betty Lou Creco (Katherine Helmond), the Captain's wife's niece, to the ball. Muldoon tells the men he asked his mother to go. Block tells the men Muldoon better be in his office the next day to ask Betty Lou. Toody tells Muldoon about Betty Lou. Muldoon says he can't ask her because he doesn't think he's good looking enough. The boys of the 53rd want to boost his ego so he will ask Betty Lou. Schnauser recruits beautiful Officer Darlene Duffy to help. She is not happy about it, but she owes Schnauser a favor. They may have over done it, because suddenly he's a Casanova asking every girl out and all the girls are crazy about him. Block tells Betty Lou what a quiet and shy man Muldoon is. Muldoon arrives at the precinct and he's anything but shy. Block tries to introduce Betty Lou to Muldoon, but he keeps getting calls from other women. Betty Lou thinks Muldoon is wonderful. Even Darlene is now interested in Muldoon. Now the boys have to deflate his ego and bring him back to the old Muldoon. He does lose his confidence and the girls are no longer interested in him. When none of the other women accept his invitation to the ball, he finally and nervously asks Betty Lou. Betty Lou isn't even interested in him and Francis winds up taking his mother. Lainie Kazan as girl at bar. Jean Stapleton as Mrs. Duggan.
46	16	"The White Elephant"	Stanley Prager	Terry Ryan	January 6, 1963
Maury Perkins (Michael Vale), a Real Estate Agent, rents the Hasty Tasty Luncheonette. It turns out he rented the place to a gang of crooks who want to drill through a common wall that is shared with a bank vault next door. Toody and Muldoon come by and meet Eddie and Laverne (Arlene Golonka) Montaine, Duke Thornton (Jake LaMotta) and Barney. At first the crooks are worried, but Toody and Muldoon are just there to welcome them to the neighborhood. Toody wants to help the new owners because the eatery could never make a go of it. Some of the boys of the 53rd stop by to see how they're doing and offer to help fix the place up. Before too long they have the luncheonette up and running. Eddie returns and sees there's no hole in the wall to the bank. He wants to kick the customers out, but they turn out to be the men from the 53rd. Duke actually enjoys cooking. So the cops never come back, Eddie messes up the food. Everyone gets sick, except Toody, who is used to Lucille's cooking. Toody and Muldoon find Willie Nolan, an ex-con who is a great cook. Later, Eddie says they have to go out of business. Willie was used to cooking for 3200 men in prison. Toody and Muldoon find a way to have Eddie sell all the food. The crooks decide they are better off running a legitimate catering business. Mel Stewart as Officer Julie. George Mathews as Pete.
47	17	"Benny the Bookie's Last Chance"	Stanley Prager	Art Baer & Gary Belkin	January 13, 1963
Benny the Bookie's (Gene Baylos) up for parole yet again. Capt. Block tells Toody and Muldoon that every time they go to plead for his parole, Benny is arrested not long after. The guys are sure he's going straight this time. They want to set Benny up with a candy store. Benny is not even in the store a day when he runs afoul with local gangster Spencer Brown (B.S. Pully). Benny started taking bets in Brown's territory. Brown wants $30,000 from Benny. Benny goes to his friend Katz the Butcher (Gerald Hiken) and asks to borrow the money. Katz obviously doesn't have that much. Benny decides to get himself arrested so he can go back to the safety of jail. Block tells Toody and Muldoon that Benny better not get in any trouble. Benny repeatedly gets arrested, but the boys manage to get him off each time. In another attempt to get arrested, Benny inadvertently saves Brown's family from a fire. Benny and Brown become partners in the candy store. Benny winds up with the woman from the park. Margaret Hamilton as woman Benny accosts in the park.
48	18	"The Presidential Itch"	Stanley Prager	Story by : Robert Van Scoyk; Teleplay by : Nat Hiken, Billy Friedberg and Robert Van Scoyk	January 20, 1963
The policeman's Brotherhood Club is having a meeting. Walter Gander (Bernie West) is there to give a speech on cemetery plot plans. Nicholson doesn't like the idea that president Muldoon gets to make all the decisions. Muldoon somewhat agrees that he's been acting a little like a dictator. It's only because he's been president for so long and no one ever runs against him. The men say they like him as president. Muldoon, however, says he isn't going to run next time unless there is competition. The boys don't want Muldoon to lose so they convince Toody to run. They figure no one is stupid enough to vote for Toody. Even Lucille laughs when Toody tells her about it. That night Toody dreams he wins the Club presidency, then town mayor, governor and President of the United States. Jim McBride's wife, Florence, laughs when he says he's going to be Toody's campaign manager. Jim dreams that he's the one that gets Toody elected mayor and governor. Toody and Muldoon agree to not campaign against each other. But then a misunderstanding causes the men to campaign for the two men. Because Toody's men make outrageous promises, it's looks as though Toody could win. Schnauser's idea to have Capt. Block campaign for Muldoon backfires. Another idea backfires as well. Schnauser gets Toody to unknowingly assure a Muldoon victory.
49	19	"Toody & Muldoon Meet the Russians"	Stanley Prager	Nat Hiken & Billy Friedberg	January 27, 1963
Russian Commissar Malonov (Jules Munshin) and General Raskonokov (Mara Lynn) arrive in New York. Malonov tells Domsky (Gerald Hiken), his Chief of Protocol, that he wants to see the real USA. He wants to see the starvation and the decaying capitalist system. Toody and Muldoon are assigned to guard the Russians. Toody happens to mention to Malonov that his brother-in-law Julius (Heywood Hale Broun) has a plumbing supply company. Malonov wants Toody to show him the downtrodden capitalist workers at the company. Muldoon is to take the General on a sight seeing tour of the town. Muldoon is surprised to find out the General is a woman. He is afraid to take her into Polish and Hungarian neighborhoods dressed as a Russian General. Muldoon thinks she should get a dress and she at first refuses. Malonov asks Toody if he knows about Marx and Toody starts to describe the Marx Brothers movies. The conversation gets more confusing. Muldoon takes Raskonokov to salons where she fights every step to make her more attractive. Toody and Malonov go to a baseball game. Raskonokov is transformed into a beautiful woman and she likes it. Malonov is having a great time at the game until he sees a Russian Spy (B.S. Pully) watching him. Raskonokov has Muldoon take her to a strip club. Toody takes Malonov to Julius' company. When Malonov gives Julius a suggestion to make a product better, Julius offers to make him a partner. Before the day is over the boys have turned the Russians into American capitalists. Greg Morris as U.N. Delegate from Saudi Arabia. Sylvia Miles as hair stylist.
50	20	"Here We Go Again"	Stanley Prager	Gary Belkin & Art Baer	February 3, 1963
Muldoon is over at Toody's house. Toody wants to watch "Police File" on TV. It's hosted by Conrad Nagel, who recreates crime stories. Captain Block is watching the show as well. He gets upset because the 53rd never has any big cases to solve. The next day, Conrad comes by the police station. He believes he has one of the greatest pieces of police work ever and it came out of the 53rd. Conrad mentions it was a Captain that solved the case and Block thinks he's talking about him. It turns out it was in 1919 and the case was handled by Captain Patrick Muldoon, Francis' father. Conrad would like to clear up a few things with Muldoon. Muldoon finds his father's diary and discovers that, in solving that case, he wasn't a hero or a genius. It was just a simple mistake made by the crooks. Muldoon tracks down 'Baby Face' Gordon, the leader of the old gang, to ask him how they could make that simple mistake. Baby Face has no idea what the mistake was. Muldoon tells him the gang was wearing summertime police uniforms, when the police had already switched to winter uniforms. The elderly gang now gets together to try and recreate the crime. Jake LaMotta as Muscles McGurk. Edward Atienza as Swifty Swandon. Judith Lowry as Trixie LaTouche as an Old Woman.
51	21	"The Star Boarder"	Stanley Prager	Terry Ryan	February 10, 1963
Lucille goes on a spending spree and buys a piano. Gunther and her decide to make some extra money by renting a room. Lucille is about to take in Rhoda Nelson (Paula Stewart) as a boarder. It turns out that Rhoda knows Toody from when she was a hostess at a USO. When Lucille finds out that the two were a item back then, she tells Rhoda the room is already taken. Rev. Harold Peterson (Tom Bosley) then comes by and they decide to rent the room to him. The reverend is actually Archie The Artist, a counterfeiter. Archie pays Toody for a month in advance. Without knowing it, Toody starts spreading the fake money around. FBI Agent Potter (Dana Elcar) comes to the precinct because fake money has been showing up there. Archie plays poker with Toody and some of the other officers at Toody's house. Those guys now wind up spreading more of the money around. Potter follows a lot of false leads. When Archie believes he's about to be caught, he jumps out of a window in Toody's home. He breaks his leg and is now stuck at the house. Toody and some of the guys are planning Capt. Block's surprise birthday party. Misunderstanding the men's conversation, Archie thinks Toody and the rest are part of a mob. Archie doesn't know that Potter and Block now have a picture of him. Archie agrees to help the men with what he thinks is a robbery but is actually Block's surprise party. Block's present is capturing Archie. Brandon Maggart as Walter the Butcher. Bob Kaliban as Man Answering Ad.
52	22	"The Biggest Day of the Year"	Stanley Prager	Lou Solomon & Bob Howard	February 17, 1963
Toody is trying to keep important dates memorized. Muldoon gives Toody a present. Toody forgot it was his birthday. Toody also forgot it was Muldoon's birthday three weeks ago. Gunther thinks it's his 10th anniversary of being Muldoon's partner (but, of course, it isn't). Toody casually mentions to Muldoon that today is a very important day, but won't say why. The usually sharp minded Muldoon is going nuts trying figure out what the special occasion might be. Muldoon asks someone, who asks someone, who asks someone else, all the way from patrolmen to clerks to the Commissioner to the Governor. In each case, the men are too prideful to admit they don't know what important day this is. They just go along with it in generalities and make last-minute preparations. Schnauser has finally had enough and asks what is so special about today. The Governor (House Jameson) makes a proclamation about the day, without giving details, over the radio. Everyone still leaves, even though they don't know where they're going. Toody gives Muldoon a present and Muldoon tells him it isn't their 10th anniversary. John C. Becher as the Mayor. Herschel Bernardi as the Governor's Aide. Matt Crowley as Police Commissioner. Bernard Barrow as Policeman. Bruce Kirby as Officer Kissel. Fred Stewart as Advisor of the Governor.
53	23	"Here Comes Charlie"	Stanley Prager	Nat Hiken & Billy Friedberg	February 24, 1963
The boys of the 53rd Precinct are tired of trying to rehabilitate chronically drunk Charlie (Larry Storch). Capt. Block is especially upset because the men never arrest and book Charlie, they just let him sleep it off in the jail. But they give him one more chance by trying to find Charlie a job where he won't be tempted to drink. First they get him a job at Tannenbaum's (Henry Lascoe) bakery, but the rum cake does him in. They then try Pete DeAngelo's (Joseph Mascolo) garage, but something about the antifreeze gets Charlie drunk. Several other job attempts also fail. They decide to try and get Charlie a job at a diamond cutting business. Because they need steady hands, no one drinks there. Toody and Muldoon go to check the place out. Schnauser thinks it's too much of a risk. Muldoon agrees and thinks they should keep an eye on Charlie. But the officers' regular visits to check up on Charlie have an unnerving effect on his teetotaling coworkers. An Inspector hears what the 53rd did for Charlie and thinks it would make a good news story. It's not long before everyone at the diamond cutting business is drinking. Block and the newspaper men show up and everyone but Charlie is drunk. Something triggers Charlie and he's back to drinking. Margaret Hamilton as Miss Powntleroy. Joseph Sweeney as Jim McNaughton.
54	24	"See You at the Bar Mitzvah"	Stanley Prager	Max Wilk	March 3, 1963
Toody and Muldoon find out that Joel Pokrass (Claude Gersene), one of the boys on their PAL basketball team, isn't playing well because he's worried about his upcoming Bar Mitzvah. It turns out that the boy's father, Samuel Pokrass (B.S. Pully), is a notorious slumlord. Although everyone likes Joel, not one person who lives in the 53rd Precinct will come to his Bar Mitzvah because most of them have lived, at one time or another, in one of Pokrass' crumbling slum buildings and hates him. Toody tells Joel that he will make sure that there are a lot of people at his Bar Mitzvah. When Toody and Muldoon have no luck finding anyone, they go to talk to Pokrass. They learn why no one like Pokrass. Toody and Muldoon then go to talk to Rabbi Solomon (Shelley Berman). Solomon says that he's talked to people about the Bar Mitzvah, but no one is interested. Solomon calls Father Charlie Donovan (Barney Martin) to see if he can help. Donovan will try to get people, but he can't make any promises. Toody and Muldoon are about to go to the Bar Mitzvah. Capt. Block gives them a last minute assignment. They are to take some prisoners to night court. The Bar Mitzvah has started and there's only a couple of Joel's friends there. Toody and Muldoon show up with the prisoners. Then some other people that had a change of heart arrive to make it a great showing. When Samuel sees how happy this made Joel, he decides to change his ways. Joe Downing as a Prisoner. Joey Faye as a Prisoner. Paul O'Keefe as Joel's friend. Gerald Hiken as Katz the butcher.
55	25	"I've Been Here Before"	Stanley Prager	Terry Ryan	March 10, 1963
Danny's crime gang is not having any luck pulling off a robbery. Because of something one of his men says, Danny decides to base their heists on the plots of the television program "Crimebusters". Meanwhile, Toody and Muldoon decide to study some police text books. It's not long before Toody wants to watch "Crimebusters" as it's one of his favorite shows. When the gang pull their first heist, Toody explains how it was done to the Inspector (Lawrence Fletcher). The Inspector asks for Toody's help when a bank is robbed next. The next night, Muldoon insists that he and Toody study. The gang then rob a museum, but because Toddy didn't watch the last "Crimebusters", he can't help this time. Meanwhile, TV Executive Holland (David Doyle) accuses his "Crimebusters" writer (Phil Leeds) of stealing plots from the newspaper. The writer realizes that the crimes were all done the day after the show. Holland wants the next episode of "Crimebusters" pulled from the schedule. Even though the TV station runs a different show that night, Toody is able to help the Inspector catch the crooks. Arlene Golonka as Edie the Gun Moll. Jake LaMotta as Bugsy. John McGovern as the Police Commissioner.
56	26	"Joan Crawford Didn't Say No"	Stanley Prager	Story by : Nak Hiken; Teleplay by : Gary Belkin	March 17, 1963
Meyer Eisenberg (Jacob Kalish, real life husband of Molly Picon), an old delicatessen owner, reports he will be marrying Joan Crawford. His daughter Thelma (Rae Allen) complains to Capt. Block about the phony matrimonial service her father went to. Mrs. Harrigan (Judith Lowry), the Cleaning Woman, tells Block that she'll leaving as she's marrying Charles Boyer. Toody and Muldoon are sent out to bust the "Wedding Bells Matrimonial Agency" that promises to pair its clients with Hollywood movie stars. When they get there, the boys find out old friend Mrs. Rachel Bronson (Molly Picon) is running the business. As they try to get her to stop the matchmaking, she is trying to set up Muldoon with Anita Ekberg. Muldoon tries to talk some sense into Rachel. After talking a little longer, Muldoon actually falls for the idea of marrying a star. Block then talks to Mrs. Bronson. Everyone that tries to shut her down, starts to believe they can be set up with a star. Assistant DA Clark (Hal Linden) finally brings Rachel before the Judge (Joseph Sweeney). Charges are eventually dropped against Mrs. Bronson when it is learned from Muldoon that all her clients wind up marrying one of the other clients. Rachel even sets the Judge up with someone. Matt Crowley as Chief Inspector Brown. Ruth Kobart as Callahan. Patricia Bright as Mrs. Block.
57	27	"Lucille Is 40"	Stanley Prager	Ben Joelson & Art Baer	March 24, 1963
Muldoon is having dinner at Toody's house. Lucille mentions that she'll be going to visit her sister. She then gets upset because she'll be turning 40 in a couple days. Something Toody says makes things even worse. Muldoon gives Toody some advice on how to make Lucille feel better, but Toody uses it the wrong way. Toody has to spend the night with Muldoon. The next day they make up and Lucille leaves to see her sister. Gunther decides to surprise Lucille by buying her a wig for a birthday gift. Toody can't decide which wig to buy. Meanwhile, Sylvia Schnauser wants to get out of the house. She suggests visiting Toody because Lucille is away. Muldoon is at Toody's house wearing a dress and modeling wigs so Toody can decide which one he will give to Lucille. Sylvia and Leo see Muldoon from behind and believe Toody is with another woman. Lucille is back in town and agrees to meet Sylvia at a diner. Lucille comes up with a possible explanation when Sylvia tells her Toody has another woman. Lucille goes to make a phone call. Sylvia then sees Toody at the diner with Miss Allison (Sandu Scott), the wig saleswoman. She misunderstands their conversation and believes Toody is going to kill Lucille. Sylvia tells Lucille and the misunderstandings continue until Toody finally gives his wife the wig.
58	28	"The Loves of Sylvia Schnauser"	Stanley Prager	Tony Webster & Nat Hiken	March 31, 1963
Inspector Crown (Matt Crowley) informs Capt. Block that a group of con-artists who are posing as book publishers have moved into his precinct. The crooks bilk people out of their life savings, promising them they will publish their books. Mrs. Abernathy (Ruth Kobart) complains to Block that her son Bentley (Charles Nelson Reilly) was taken in by the crooks. Sylvia Schnauser is chosen by the police department to help set a clever trap for the con-artists. But, Daniels (David Doyle) and Billson (Joe De Santis) of the fake publishing office actually get Sylvia to believe that she can write. Sylvia refuses to file charges against the men. Leo thinks Sylvia is writing about of her many loves, but she is really writing about her many loves of food. Rumors spread in the police station and everyone thinks they could be included in Sylvia's scandalous book. The men go to talk to Sylvia about not telling their story. Schnauser thinks each of them have a thing for her. Toody and Muldoon go to every publisher they can and tell them not to publish Sylvia's book. Now everyone wants the rights to her book. In the end, the crooks are made to leave town and give the stolen money back. Sylvia decides to write a book about all the rumors in the police station the men asked her not to mention. Joseph Sweeney as A. E. Van Cleve. Kenneth Mars as a Book Publisher.
59	29	"Puncher & Judy"	Stanley Prager	Nat Hiken	April 7, 1963
Kissel tells Schnauser and Nicholson that he regrets not becoming a boxer. Toody tells Kissel that he signed him up for a fight in the Golden Gloves tournament. Kissel now panics about actually having to fight. Capt. Block gives Toody a hard time about losing his gun. Judy Sanford (Shari Lewis), from the local beauty parlor, needs Toody and Muldoon's help. She would like them to discourage Antoinne (Rocky Graziano), the male hair dresser at the same parlor, from continuing his amateur boxing career. Judy is quite worried because Antoinne really is a gentle soul. Toody and Muldoon talk Waxy Kilroy (Paul Lipson), owner of the local gym, into setting up a fight with Antoinne and a real fighter, Spider McGovern (Frank Gioseffi). But Antoinne wins. The boys then get Sugar Ray Robinson to dress up like a 70 year old man and fight Antoinne. They hope that if Antoinne loses to an old man, he will give up fighting. Sugar Ray knocks him out and Antoinne decides to quit fighting. But now Antoinne takes his aggression out on his customers. The boys have to talk Antoinne into resuming his amateur boxing. They get Sugar Ray to help. Lu Leonard as Mrs. Dobernack. Richard Ward as Boxer. Humphrey Davis as the Attorney.
60	30	"The Curse of the Snitkins"	Stanley Prager & Nat Hiken	Story by : Nat Hiken, Art Baer & Ben Joelson; Teleplay by : Art Baer & Ben Joelson	April 14, 1963
The men are tired because officers have retired and haven't been replaced. Toody and Muldoon are on extra night duty and stop at a diner. Another Officer comes in and sits by himself. Alice the waitress tells Toody he's from the 12th precinct. Toody and Muldoon strike up a conversation with him and learn his name is Luther Snitkin (Jack Gilford). They talk Snitkin into transferring to the 53rd. Capt. Block calls Capt. Harris at the 12th. Harris says he can't spare any man, but then he hears Block wants Sniktin. Because Snitkin brings nothing but bad luck wherever he goes, Harris agrees. Schnauser learns Snitkin's been assigned to numerous precincts and each one has suffered a ton of injuries to their officers. Word gets out who the new guy is and that's not good. One disaster follows another and guys wind up on the hospital. Muldoon tells Schnauser that there are logical reasons for all the accidents and that Snitkin isn't a jinx. Schnauser winds up in the hospital. Sniktin tells Toody and Muldoon he knows he's a jinx. Toody and Muldoon try to find ways to give Snitkin his confidence back. They find a way to get rid of Snitkin's jinx. But did they transfer it to themselves? Godfrey Cambridge as Officer Webster. Jack Dodson as a Workman. Richard Mulligan as Patrolman. Joseph Sweeney as The Judge.
