= John Strauss =

American composer and music editor

John Leonard Strauss (April 28, 1920 – February 14, 2011) was an American television and film composer and music editor. Strauss co-wrote the theme song for the NBC television series, Car 54, Where Are You?, with Nat Hiken. He also won a Grammy Award for his work as the producer of the soundtrack for the 1984 film, Amadeus. He also frequently collaborated with director Woody Allen in his films, including Take the Money and Run in 1969 and Everything You Always Wanted to Know About Sex* (*But Were Afraid to Ask) in 1972.

== Biography ==
Strauss was born in New York City. He served in the United States Army in both North Africa and France during World War II. He studied at Yale University with Paul Hindemith following the end of the war.

In addition to co-writing the theme song for the TV sitcom Car 54, Where Are You?, Strauss won an Emmy Award in sound editing for his work on the 1978 television movie, The Amazing Howard Hughes. He also wrote the theme song for The Phil Silvers Show. Strauss appeared briefly as an orchestra conductor in the film Amadeus.

== Personal life ==
Strauss married actress Charlotte Rae on November 4, 1951, but the marriage ended in divorce in 1976 when he came out as bisexual. The couple had two sons, Larry and Andrew. Strauss' partner, Lionel Friedman, died in 2003.

A longtime resident of Los Angeles, Strauss died in the city on February 14, 2011, of Parkinson's disease, at the age of 90.
