= Maurice Gosfield =

American actor (1913–1964)

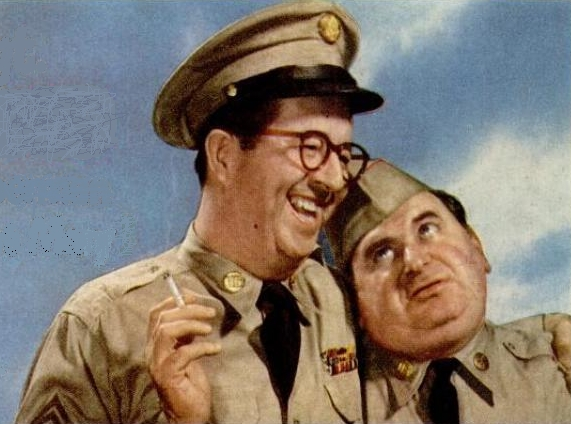
- Gosfield as Duane Doberman (right) with Phil Silvers as Ernie Bilko on the cover of Life magazine (1956)
- Born: Maurice Lionel Gosfield; January 28, 1913; New York City, U.S.A.
- Died: October 19, 1964 (aged 51); Saranac Lake, New York, U.S.
- Resting place: Long Island National Cemetery
- Occupation: Actor
- Years active: 1934–1964
- Known for: The Phil Silvers Show; Top Cat

Maurice Lionel Gosfield (January 28, 1913 – October 19, 1964) was an American stage, film, radio and television actor, best remembered for his portrayal of Private Duane Doberman on the sitcom The Phil Silvers Show (1954–1959) and voicing Benny the Ball in Top Cat (1961–1962).

== Biography ==
=== Early life ===
Gosfield was born in New York City, but partly raised in Philadelphia and, later, in Evanston, Illinois.

=== Pre-war career ===
In 1937, he made his Broadway debut as Manero in the play Siege. Other theatre credits from the late 1930s include The Petrified Forest, Three Men on a Horse and Room Service. He also made several appearances on radio programs.

In September 1941, Gosfield joined the cast of the Broadway play Keep Covered.

During World War II, he served in the U.S. Army as a Technician fourth grade (T/4) in the 8th Armored Division.

=== Post-war career ===
In early 1951, Gosfield acted in the play Darkness at Noon, which ran for 156 performances from January to June 1951, and in September 1951, he joined the cast of Out West of Eighth, which closed after only four performances.

From October to November 1952, he had a comedic role as "A Turkish Gentleman" in the play In Any Language, his performance being singled out as the funniest of the play by reviewers of the show. From late 1954 to early 1955, he acted in A Stone for Danny Fisher, which ran off-Broadway at the Downtown National Theater.

=== The Phil Silvers Show ===
From 1955 to 1959, Gosfield played Private Duane Doberman in The Phil Silvers Show (titled You'll Never Get Rich in its first season). Doberman was written as the most woebegone soldier. The actor originally hired for the part was Maurice Brenner, but Brenner was recast as Private Irving Fleischman. The show's creator Nat Hiken's biography details the casting for the role and the effect that Gosfield had on him, the producer and Phil Silvers when he appeared in front of them:

The dumpy, spectacularly ugly Maurice Gosfield ambled into an open casting call one day, brandishing an enormous list of credits. A handful of his bit parts on stage are easy enough to confirm; more difficult to pin down are his claims of two-thousand radio credits and one hundred TV appearances. Nonetheless, they were impressed with him. "None of the man's background, though, really mattered to Hiken and Silvers once they got a good look at him. Nat had already picked someone to play the most woebegone member of Bilko's platoon, but immediately he knew that here [Maurice Gosfield] was the man born for the part".

In 1959, Gosfield was nominated for a Primetime Emmy Award for Best Supporting Actor in a Comedy Series for the show. DC Comics published eleven issues of a Private Doberman comic from 1957 to 1960. That same year, he again played Private Doberman in the television show Keep in Step and made his final appearance as the character, the following year, when he guest starred on The Jack Benny Program.

Phil Silvers, in his 1973 autobiography, said of Gosfield that he had a pomposity and condescension off-screen and "thought of himself as Cary Grant playing a short, plump man", Silvers continued: "He began to have delusions. He did not realize that the situations in which he worked, plus the sharp lines provided by Nat and the other writers, made him funny." For his part, Gosfield crowed, "Without me, the Bilko show would be nothing."

=== Later years ===
In 1961, Gosfield appeared in the film The Teenage Millionaire (1961). He also provided the voice for Benny the Ball on the cartoon series Top Cat which was partly based on the Sergeant Bilko series. His last role was in the 1963 film The Thrill of It All, playing a truck driver. In 1964, he unsuccessfully tested for the role of Uncle Fester in the TV series The Addams Family.

=== Illness and death ===
On October 14, 1964, while he was performing in a play at a New York theatre, Gosfield kept losing his balance and repeatedly falling asleep. He was diagnosed as having critical hypertension and was given seven different medications, which he was told to take for the rest of his life.

On October 19, 1964, Gosfield died at age 51 at Will Rogers Memorial Hospital in Saranac Lake, New York after suffering "a series of ailments including diabetes and heart trouble and other complications." Gosfield was buried at Long Island National Cemetery, Suffolk County, New York.

== Filmography ==
- Ma and Pa Kettle Go to Town (1950) as New York tour ticket seller (uncredited)
- Guilty Bystander (1950) as guard on bridge (uncredited)
- Teenage Millionaire (1961) as Ernie
- The Thrill of It All (1963) as truck driver (final film role)

=== Television ===
- Studio One (1949, Episode: "The Glass Key")
- The Clock (1949, Episode #1.25)
- We the People (1952, Episode - Episode dated 15 February 1952) as himself
- The New Recruits (1955, TV Movie) as Pvt. Mulrooney
- The Phil Silvers Show (1955–1959) as Pvt. Duane Doberman
- The Ed Sullivan Show (1956–1958) as Pvt. Duane Doberman / himself
- The Steve Allen Plymouth Show (1958, Episode #3.34) as himself, guest
- The Phil Silvers Pontiac Special: Keep in Step (1959, TV Special) as Pvt. Duane Doberman
- Summer in New York (1960, TV Movie)
- The Jack Benny Program (1960, Episode: "Maurice Gosfield/Amateur Show") as himself / Pvt. Duane Doberman
- One Happy Family (1961, Episode: "Big Night") as Fred
- The Detectives (1961, Episode: "Secret Assignment") as Angie
- The Red Skelton Hour (1961, Episode: "San Fernando and the Kaaka Maami Island") as millionaire
- The Jim Backus Show (1961, Episode: "Old Army Game") as Private Dilly Dillingham
- Top Cat (1961–1962) as Benny the Ball (voice)
