= Jack Healy =

American actor and boxing manager

- Healy in The Phil Silvers Show, 1955
- Born: March 9, 1904
- Died: July 14, 1972 (aged 68); New York, U.S.

Jack Healy (March 9, 1904 – July 14, 1972) was an American actor and the co-manager of boxer Rocky Graziano. He was best known for playing Pvt. Chet Mullen in The Phil Silvers Show.

Healy died on July 14, 1972 at his home in New York, at the age of 68.

== Filmography ==
=== Film ===
Year	Title	Role	Notes
1955	I Am a Camera	Clive	uncredited
1955	The New Recruits	Pvt. Sid Mullen	TV movie
1959	Keep in Step	Pvt. Mullen	TV movie
1961	The Hustler	Hotel Proprietor	uncredited

=== Television ===
Year	Title	Role	Notes
1955-1959	The Phil Silvers Show	Pvt. Chet Mullen	134 episodes
1961-1963	Car 54, Where Are You?	Officer Michael Rodriguez	30 episodes
