= Billy Friedberg =

American producer and screenwriter

- Born: William "Billy" Friedberg; April 22, 1915; New York, U.S.
- Died: April 7, 1965 (aged 49); Los Angeles, California, U.S.
- Education: Columbia University
- Occupations: Producer, screenwriter
- Years active: 1950-1965
- Spouse: Hope Cameron (m. 1950)

William Friedberg (April 22, 1915 - April 7, 1965) was an American producer and screenwriter.

Friedberg started his career in 1950 writing for All Star Revue. In 1951 he appeared in the broadway play Two on the Aisle. He also wrote an episode of The Colgate Comedy Hour with screenwriter Nat Hiken. He later wrote for 43 episodes of Hiken's comedy series The Phil Silvers Show. Friedberg's writing credits also include The Jackie Gleason Show, Car 54, Where Are You? and Peter Loves Mary. In 1957, he won a Primetime Emmy for Best Comedy Writing - Variety or Situation Comedy.

Friedberg died in April 1965 of a heart attack in Los Angeles, California, at the age of 49.
