= The Phil Silvers Show =

American sitcom (1955–1959)

- Also known as: You'll Never Get Rich; Sergeant Bilko; Bilko
- Created by: Nat Hiken
- Directed by: Nat Hiken; Al De Caprio; Charles Friedman
- Starring: Phil Silvers
- Theme music composer: John Strauss
- Composer: John Strauss
- Country of origin: United States
- Original language: English
- No. of seasons: 4
- No. of episodes: 144 (1 pilot and 1 special) (list of episodes)

Production
- Producers: Nat Hiken; Edward J. Montagne
- Running time: 30 minutes (per episode, including commercials)
- Production company: The CBS Television Network

Original release
- Network: CBS
- Release: September 20, 1955 – September 11, 1959

The Phil Silvers Show, originally titled You'll Never Get Rich, is an American sitcom which ran on the CBS Television Network from 1955 to 1959. A pilot titled "Audition Show" was made in 1955, but it was never broadcast. 143 other episodes were broadcast – all half-an-hour long except for a 1959 one-hour live special. The series starred Phil Silvers as Master Sergeant Ernest G. Bilko of the United States Army.

The series was created by Nat Hiken and won three consecutive Emmy Awards for Best Comedy Series. The show is sometimes titled Sergeant Bilko or simply Bilko in reruns, and it is very often referred to by these names, both on-screen and by viewers. The show's success transformed Silvers from a journeyman comedian into a star and writer-producer Hiken from a highly regarded behind-the-scenes comedy writer into a publicly recognized creator.

== Production ==
By 1955, the American television business was already moving westward to Los Angeles, but Nat Hiken insisted on filming the series in New York City. He believed this location was more conducive to comedic creativity and the show's humor. Early episodes were filmed at Dumont's television center in New York City – now home to WNYW-TV – with later episodes shot at the CBS "Hi Brown" Studios in Chelsea, Manhattan.

Most of the series was filmed to simulate a live performance. The actors memorized their lines and performed the scenes in sequence before a studio audience. Thus, there are occasional flubs and awkward pauses. Actor Paul Ford, playing Bilko's commanding officer, was notorious for forgetting his lines; when he would get a blank expression on his face, Silvers and the rest of the cast would improvise something to save the scene, like "Oh, you remember, Colonel, the top brass is coming..." At that point, Ford would pick up where he left off.

Creator Nat Hiken wrote or co-wrote 70 of the first 71 episodes, missing only episode 70 (the second-season finale.) He left the show after that season. In the fourth season, the writing staff included Neil Simon, who wrote or co-wrote 20 episodes, including the series finale. Future Columbia Pictures VP and theatrical agent Harvey Orkin, later known as a regular on Not So Much a Programme, More a Way of Life, was among the writers who were recognized with the Emmy Award for Best Comedy Writing in 1956.

Later episodes were filmed in California. Producer Mike Todd, making a guest appearance, insisted that his show should be filmed like a movie, out of sequence. The cast and crew tried it and soon found that Todd's way was easier. Production continued in this manner until the series ended in 1959.

The fact that Silvers and Hiken were both sports fans inspired some of the character names. Bilko was named after Steve Bilko, a minor league baseball player (it also had the connotation, to bilk someone). Cpl Barbella was named after middleweight boxing champion Rocky Graziano (whose birth name was Rocco Barbella). Pvt Paparelli was named after the baseball umpire Joe Paparella. According to Silvers, Pvt Doberman was so named because actor Maurice Gosfield resembled a doberman pinscher.

== Premise ==
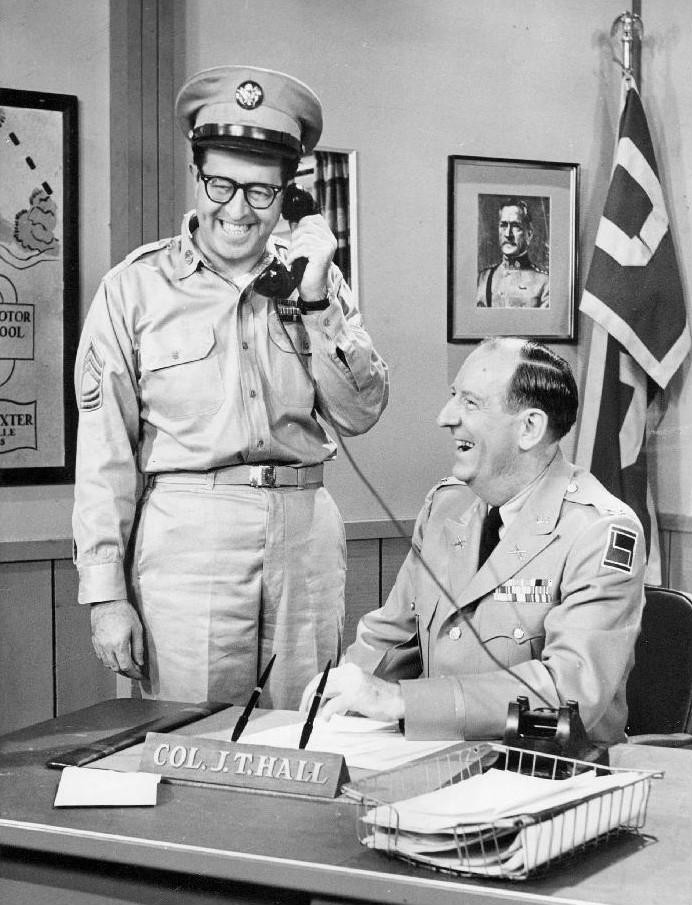
Sgt. Bilko with Col. Hall

The series was originally set in Fort Baxter, a sleepy, unremarkable U.S. Army post in the fictional town of Roseville, Kansas. It was centered on the soldiers of the Fort Baxter motor pool under Master Sergeant Ernest G. Bilko. Bilko and his men seemed to spend little time performing their duties: Bilko in particular spent most of his time trying to wheedle money through various get-rich-quick scams and promotions, or to find ways to get others to do his work for him.

While Bilko's soldiers regularly helped him with his schemes, they were just as likely to become "pigeons" in one. Nevertheless, Bilko exhibited an odd paternalism toward his victims, and he would doggedly shield them from all outside antagonists. The sergeant's attitude toward his men has been described thus: "They were his men and if anyone was going to take them, it was going to be him and only him." Through it all, the platoon was generally loyal to Bilko, despite their wariness of his crafty nature, and they would depend on him to get them out of any military misfortune. If one of his boys was treated unfairly or was cheated in any way, Bilko always helped the injured party, using the same psychological guile and chicanery he used to outwit his suckers. This benevolent side of Bilko was toned down in the series's later seasons (with scripts, significantly, by different writers); Bilko became strictly mercenary, willing to swindle anyone for a fast buck.

Bilko's swindles were usually directed toward (or behind the back of) Col. John T. Hall, the overmatched and beleaguered post commander who had early in his career been nicknamed "Melon Head". Despite his flaws and weaknesses, Col. Hall would get the best of Bilko just often enough to establish his credentials as a wary and vigilant adversary. The colonel would frequently be shown looking out his window, worried without explanation or evidence, simply because he knew that Bilko was out there somewhere, planning something. The colonel's wife, Nell (Hope Sansberry), had only the kindest thoughts toward Bilko, who would shamelessly flatter her whenever he met her.

Bilko and Hall were not always adversaries. In an episode entitled "The Court Martial" (1956), Bilko tries to assist the colonel in setting a speed record for inducting new recruits, which accidentally results in a private's pet chimpanzee being enrolled. The animal's failure to answer when addressed by the phrase "Hurry! Speak Up!" is soon misheard and interpreted as being his name, "Harry Speakup", continuing the error and the imposture. Harry passes the medical and psychiatric exams, receives a uniform, and is formally sworn in. With the superior officers in a panic, Bilko saves the day by orchestrating an honorable discharge for the chimpanzee.

The show's setting changed with the fourth season, when the men of Fort Baxter were reassigned to Camp Fremont in California. This mass transfer was explained in storyline as being orchestrated by Bilko, who had discovered a map showing a gold deposit near the abandoned army post. One reason for the change from Kansas was so that the series could more plausibly bring in guest stars from nearby Hollywood, such as Dean Martin, Mickey Rooney, Diana Dors and Lucille Ball. Silvers played himself in one hourlong episode.

== Cast ==
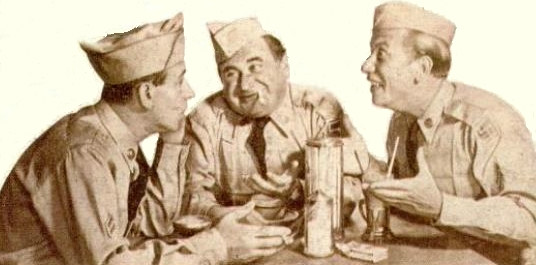
An advertisement for Camel cigarettes from 1957. Shown are Pvt Doberman (Maurice Gosfield, center) and Cpl Henshaw (Allan Melvin, right).

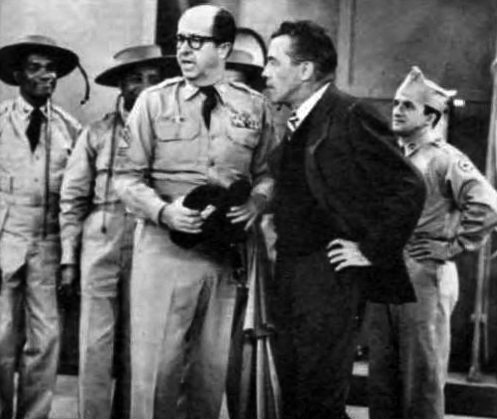
Ed Sullivan made his first cameo television appearance on the show.

Bilko's right-hand men were Cpl. Rocco Barbella (Harvey Lembeck) and Cpl. Steve Henshaw (Allan Melvin), and his long-suffering superior was Col. John T. Hall (Paul Ford). Bilko's motorpool platoon included Herbie Faye (a former burlesque crony of Silvers) as Cpl. Sam Fender, Maurice Gosfield as Pvt. Duane Doberman, Billy Sands as Pvt. Dino Paparelli, Mickey Freeman as diminutive Pvt. Fielding Zimmerman, Tige Andrews (billed under his given name, Tiger Andrews) as Pvt. Gander, Jack Healy as the tough-talking Pvt. Mullen, Maurice Brenner as Pvt. Irving Fleischman, Karl Lukas as Pvt. Stash Kadowski, former middleweight boxer Walter Cartier as botany fiend Pvt. Claude Dillingham (in season one), Bernie Fein as Pvt. Gomez, P.Jay Sidney as Pvt. Palmer and Terry Carter as Pvt. Sugarman. Sidney and Carter (and Billie Allen, who played WAC Billie) were African American and regularly appeared in the series at a time when American society (and television) was largely segregated. The Army was desegregated under President Harry Truman.

Other recurring characters included Hope Sansberry as Mrs. Hall, Harry Clark as camp cook Sgt. Stanley Sowici; after Clark's death the role of cook was played by burlesque comic Joe E. Ross as Sgt. Rupert Ritzik; Beatrice Pons as loud-mouthed Mrs. Ritzik, Ned Glass as quartermaster Sgt. Andy Pendleton, Jimmy Little as Sgt. Francis Grover, Nicholas Saunders as Hall's adjutant Captain Barker, and John Gibson as an unnamed Chaplain that Sgt. Bilko addressed as "Padre". He is addressed by the name "Tom" by Col.Hall in the pilot episode "The New Recruits".

Some episodes gave Bilko a romantic interest, Elisabeth Fraser as Sgt. Joan Hogan.

The series frequently featured so many secondary cast members, with so many speaking parts, that the show ultimately became too expensive to sustain. It was this factor more than any significant decline in ratings that led to the show's demise in 1959. The show was nominated for Emmy Awards for both Comedy Writing and Best Series in all four of its seasons, winning both awards in 1956, 1957, and 1958. The series received nine other nominations during its run, with Silvers winning one individual Emmy for his performance and Nat Hiken winning one for direction. As Silvers later recalled, "We went out at our height."

Guest stars included Alan Alda, Bea Arthur, Orson Bean, Peggy Cass, Dick Cavett, Arthur Duncan, Constance Ford, Eric Fleming, Dodie Goodman, Fred Gwynne, Bob Hastings, Paul Lynde, Julie Newmar, Tom Poston, Charlotte Rae, Paul Reed, Darryl Richard, Mark Rydell, Suzanne Storrs and Dick Van Dyke, then near the beginning of their careers. Later episodes used a wealth of veteran Hollywood character actors, including Harold Huber, Margaret Hamilton, Marjorie Gateson, Natalie Schafer and Frank Albertson.

George Kennedy was the show's US Army technical adviser; he had roles as a military policeman in several episodes.

=== Finale ===
In the series finale, "Weekend Colonel", Bilko discovers a short-order cook named Charlie Clusterman who is the exact double of Colonel Hall. Bilko hires the cook to impersonate the colonel, so he can cheat the other officers in a bogus charity effort. The real Colonel Hall learns of the scam, and Bilko, Henshaw, and Barbella end up being locked in the guardhouse. As Colonel Hall looks at his prisoners on a newly installed closed-circuit TV system, he quips: "It's a wonderful show, and as long as I'm the sponsor, it will never be cancelled." The camera cuts to Bilko and his henchmen finally behind bars. Bilko waves to the camera and says, "Th-th-that's all, folks!"

== Episodes ==
Season	Episodes	Originally released	
Season	Episodes	First released	Last released
Pilot		Unaired	
1	34	September 20, 1955	May 15, 1956
2	36	September 18, 1956	June 11, 1957
3	37	September 17, 1957	June 27, 1958
4	35	September 26, 1958	June 19, 1959
Special		January 23, 1959	

== Aftermath ==
Following the show's cancellation, CBS shortsightedly sold the rights to NBC: the rival network immediately aired reruns five days a week to great financial returns. Some of the show's other actors were recruited by "Bilko" producer Edward J. Montagne to appear in Nat Hiken's follow-up sitcom Car 54, Where Are You? and in McHale's Navy.

Silvers was able to parody, or play off, his enduring Bilko persona for the rest of his career. In 1963–1964, he starred in The New Phil Silvers Show, which attempted to transplant his mercenary character to a factory setting, but the result proved unpopular. Silvers frequently guest-starred on The Beverly Hillbillies as a character called Honest John. He also played unscrupulous Broadway producer Harold Hecuba on an episode of Gilligan's Island, stealing the castaways' concept for a musical version of Hamlet. In an episode of The Lucy Show, Silvers was a demanding efficiency expert; at one point, Lucy's boss Mr. Mooney (Gale Gordon), remarks that Silvers reminds him of a sergeant he used to know. Silvers also portrayed greedy connivers in various movies, such as It's a Mad, Mad, Mad, Mad World (1963), in which Paul Ford had a supporting role as a colonel, though they shared no scenes, and A Funny Thing Happened on the Way to the Forum (1966). The British film Follow That Camel (1967) cast him as a scheming sergeant, this time in the French Foreign Legion.

The original You'll Never Get Rich program, which was filmed in black-and-white, was widely rerun into the 1970s. The increasing prevalence of color television rendered it and many similar programs less marketable than they had been previously. The series reemerged in the late 1980s on the fledgling cable channel Comedy Central, then again on Nick at Nite for a short time during the 1990s (serving as charter programming for TV Land in 1996), and MeTV. In the United Kingdom the show enjoyed intermittent showings for many years, finally being broadcast on the BBC Two channel in 2004. Currently, it can be seen on Decades TV (a network broadcast on secondary television channels in many markets, and a sister channel to Me-TV, with CBS Television Stations owning the network with the owner of Me-TV, Weigel Broadcasting).

=== Legacy ===
The Bilko persona was borrowed by the Hanna-Barbera animation studio for its television cartoon series Top Cat, which drew on elements from The Phil Silvers Show. Maurice Gosfield from the original platoon voiced Benny the Ball. Hokey Wolf was another Hanna-Barbera production that borrowed heavily from The Phil Silvers Show. The episode of The Flintstones that introduced Dino gave the pet dinosaur a Sgt. Bilko-styled voice and character. After this atypical debut, Dino never spoke again. Another episode recruited Fred Flintstone and Barney Rubble into the army, where they were conned by an unnamed Bilko-like character into becoming astronaut test pilots.

The film The Manchurian Candidate (1962) used the names of several people associated with Sgt Bilko for the members of a Korean War patrol – Cpl Allan Melvin, Pvt Silvers, Pvt Hiken, and Pvt Lembeck. The characters also appear in the novel The Manchurian Candidate, which has been plagued with multiple assertions of plagiarism.

In 1987, a British tourist visited Tibet wearing a Phil Silvers "Sgt Bilko" T-shirt. Chinese soldiers attempted to rip it off her because they thought the picture was the Dalai Lama.

Larry David, creator and star of Curb Your Enthusiasm, has called The Phil Silvers Show his favorite television show.

From June 1957 to April 1960, DC Comics published a Sergeant Bilko comic book which lasted 18 issues and a Sergeant Bilko's Private Doberman series that lasted 11 issues. Most of the covers and inside artwork were by Bob Oksner.

== Broadcast history ==
- September 1955-October 1955 – Tuesdays at 8:30-9:00 pm on CBS
- November 1955-January 1958 – Tuesdays at 8:00-8:30 pm on CBS
- February 1958-September 1959 – Fridays at 9:00-9:30 pm on CBS

== Reception ==
=== Broadcast ratings ===
Season	Position
1955–1956	#30
1956–1957	#23
1957–1958	not in the top 30
1958–1959	not in the top 30

=== Primetime Emmy Award nominations and wins ===
==== 1955 (presented March 17, 1956) ====
- Best Comedy Series – Won
- Best Actor (Continuing Performance): Phil Silvers – Won
- Best Comedy Writing: Nat Hiken, Barry Blitzer, Arnold Auerbach, Harvey Orkin, Vincent Bogert, Arnold Rosen, Coleman Jacoby, Tony Webster and Terry Ryan – Won
- Best Producer (Film Series): Nat Hiken – Nominated (Winner: Walt Disney, Disneyland)
- Best Director (Film Series) Nat Hiken – Won

==== 1956 (presented March 16, 1957) ====
- Best Series (Half Hour or Less) – Won
- Best Continuing Performance by a Comedian in a Series: Phil Silvers – Nominated (Winner: Sid Caesar, Caesar's Hour)
- Best Supporting Performance by an Actor: Paul Ford – Nominated (Winner: Carl Reiner, Caesar's Hour)
- Best Comedy Writing (Variety or Situation Comedy): Nat Hiken, Billy Friedberg, Tony Webster, Leonard Stern, Arnold Rosen and Coleman Jacoby – Won

==== 1957 (presented April 15, 1958) ====
- Best Comedy Series – Won
- Best Continuing Performance by an Actor in a Leading Role in a Dramatic or Comedy Series: Phil Silvers – Nominated (Winner: Robert Young, Father Knows Best)
- Best Continuing Supporting Performance by an Actor in a Dramatic or Comedy Series: Paul Ford – Nominated (Winner: Carl Reiner, Caesar's Hour)
- Best Comedy Writing: Nat Hiken, Billy Friedberg, Phil Sharp, Terry Ryan, Coleman Jacoby, Arnold Rosen, Sydney Zelinka, A.J. Russell and Tony Webster – Won

==== 1958–1959 (presented May 6, 1959) ====
- Best Comedy Series – Nominated (Winner: The Jack Benny Show)
- Best Actor in a Leading Role (Continuing Character) in a Comedy Series: Phil Silvers – Nominated (Winner: Jack Benny, The Jack Benny Show)
- Best Supporting Actor (Continuing Character) in a Comedy Series: Maurice Gosfield – Nominated (Winner: Tom Poston, The Steve Allen Show)
- Best Writing of a Single Program of a Comedy Series: Billy Friedberg, Arnie Rosen and Coleman Jacoby for "Bilko's Vampire" - Nominated (Winner: Sam Perrin, George Balzer, Hal Goldman and Al Gordon for The Jack Benny Show: "Jack Benny Show with Ernie Kovacs")

=== UK broadcasts ===
The series was shown weekly on BBC Television during its original run from 20 April 1957 onwards, in varying timeslots, with the final first-run episode "Weekend Colonel" airing on 15 January 1961. The series returned in repeats on BBC Television (later BBC1) from June 1961 to March 1967, after which it was absent from the screen until April 1973, when it returned in a late-night timeslot (although listed in Radio Times as Sergeant Bilko/Bilko), becoming a staple of BBC1's post-11pm late-night schedule throughout the 1970s and 1980s, usually appearing immediately prior to the channel's signoff (before BBC One, as the channel was now rendered, became a 24-hour broadcaster in November 1997). The series was moved to an early evening timeslot on BBC2, beginning a repeat run of all four seasons in broadcast order from 7 November 1984. This repeat run continued through to 22 November 1991, at which point the BBC had aired all available episodes. Episodes continued to be shown, although no longer in their original broadcast order, from 1993 to 2004, with the BBC's last broadcast episode, "Bilko and the Flying Saucers", appearing on 5 November 2004.

The UK publication Radio Times Guide to Comedy ranked The Phil Silvers Show as its top TV sitcom in 2003.

Phil Silvers as Sergeant Bilko appeared on the B.B.C's Tommy Trinder series The Trinder Box during June 1959. The Radio Times of 12 June 1959 had a full cover photo of Phil Silvers as Bilko.

== Home media ==
In May 2006, CBS DVD released a 50th anniversary collection entitled The Phil Silvers Show: 50th Anniversary Edition. The three-disc set features 18 episodes from the series.

On July 27, 2010, CBS DVD (distributed by Paramount) released the first season of The Phil Silvers Show on DVD in Region 1 format. A region 2 release followed on September 6 of the same year.

On August 5, 2014, it was announced that Shout! Factory had acquired the rights to the series in Region 1 and would release Sgt. Bilko -The Phil Silvers Show: The Complete Series on November 4, 2014.

In 2015, they began releasing individual season sets, season 2 was released on April 28, 2015 followed by season 3 on August 4, 2015. The fourth and final season was released on November 17, 2015.

In Region 2, Mediumrare Entertainment has acquired the rights in the UK and released Sgt. Bilko – The Phil Silvers Show: - Complete Collection on DVD on September 22, 2014.

DVD Name	Regular Episodes	Release dates	
DVD Name	Regular Episodes	Region 1	Region 2 (UK)
The First Season	34	July 27, 2010	September 6, 2010
The Second Season	36	April 28, 2015	N/A
The Third Season	37	August 4, 2015	N/A
The Fourth Season	35	November 17, 2015	N/A
The Complete Series	142	November 4, 2014	September 22, 2014

== In other media ==
=== Film ===
The Phil Silvers Show was the basis of a critically and commercially unsuccessful movie, Sgt. Bilko (1996), starring Steve Martin as Bilko, Dan Aykroyd as Colonel Hall, Max Casella as Paparelli, and Eric Edwards as Doberman, with Phil Silvers' daughter, Cathy Silvers, as Lt. Monday. The plot centers around an investigation into wrongdoings in Fort Baxter by Major Thorn (played by Phil Hartman), an old rival of Bilko's, who will stop at nothing to get the better of Bilko.
