= Maurice Brenner =

American actor

- Brenner in The Phil Silvers Show, 1956
- Born: Morris Brenner; August 25, 1914; Chicago, Illinois, U.S.
- Died: August 25, 2005 (aged 91); Englewood, New Jersey, U.S.
- Occupation: Actor
- Years active: 1955–1993
- Spouse: Judith Brenner (died. 1998)

Morris Brenner (August 25, 1914 – August 25, 2005) was an American actor. He was best known for playing Pvt. Irving Fleischman in The Phil Silvers Show.

== Life and career ==
Brenner was born in Chicago, Illinois. He began his career in 1948, appearing in the Broadway play The Bees and the Flowers.

Brenner appeared and starred in other Broadway plays, his theatre credits including The Madwoman of Chaillot, Two's Company Sing Till Tomorrow, Lunatics and Lovers, Julia, Jake and Uncle Joe, The Beauty Part, also assistant stage-managing, Once for the Asking, Fiddler on the Roof and Minor Miracle.

From 1950 to 1993, Brenner appeared in various television programs. He was hired to play Duane Doberman on the sitcom The Phil Silvers Show, but was recast in the role of Irving Fleischman when Maurice Gosfield came and auditioned for the role of Doberman. Other television credits include Naked City, Car 54, Where Are You?, East Side/West Side, The Dick Van Dyke Show, and Tribeca. Brenner's film credits include Lilith, Mirage, The Purple Rose of Cairo, Sweet Lorraine and American Stories: Food, Family and Philosophy.

Brenner retired in 1993, last appearing in the anthology drama television series Tribeca.

== Death ==
Brenner died in August 2005 at the Actors Fund Home in Englewood, New Jersey, on his 91st birthday.

== Filmography ==
=== Film ===
Year	Title	Role	Notes
1955	The New Recruits	Pvt. Duane Doberman	TV movie
1959	Keep in Step	Pvt. Irving Fleischman	TV movie
1964	Lilith	Mr. Gordon	uncredited
1965	Mirage	Minor Role	uncredited
1985	The Purple Rose of Cairo	Diner Patron	
1987	Sweet Lorraine	Marie's Grandfather	
1989	American Stories: Food, Family and Philosophy		

=== Television ===
Year	Title	Role	Notes
1955-1959	The Phil Silvers Show	Pvt. Irving Fleischman	132 episodes
1955-1956	The Ed Sullivan Show	Pvt. Irving Fleischman/Himself	2 episodes
1961-1963	Car 54, Where Are You?	Officer Kramer/Alvin Broos/Officer Julie - Dispatcher	5 episodes
1962	Naked City	Milk Man	1 episode
1963	East Side/West Side		1 episode
1964	The Dick Van Dyke Show	Mr. Little	1 episode
1993	Tribeca	Max	1 episode
