= John Gibson (actor, born 1905) =

American film, radio and television actor

- Gibson in The Honeymooners, 1955
- Born: June 29, 1905; Oakland, California, U.S.
- Died: September 14, 1971 (aged 66); Great Neck, New York, U.S.
- Occupation(s): Film, radio and television actor

John Gibson (June 29, 1905 – September 14, 1971) was an American film, radio and television actor. He was known for playing Barney Dunlap in the radio television program Speed Gibson of the International Secret Police. He also played the chaplain in the sitcom television series The Phil Silvers Show.

== Partial filmography ==
- Run Silent, Run Deep (1958) - Captain Blunt
- It Happened to Jane (1959) - Editor (uncredited)
