= Gene Baylos =

American comedian

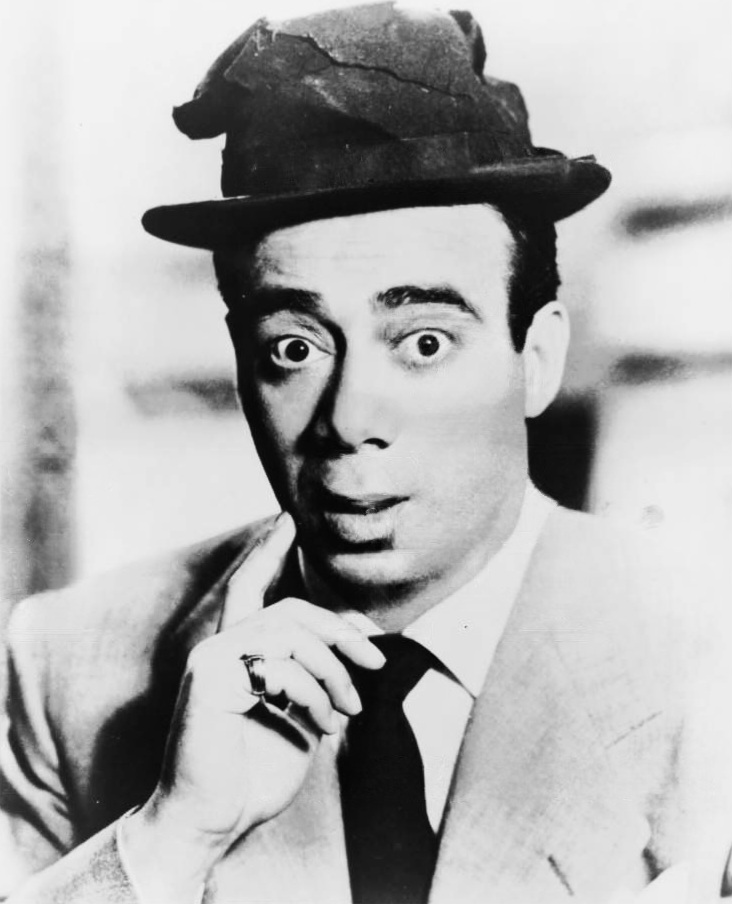
- Baylos in 1959
- Born: November 16, 1906; New York City, U.S.
- Died: January 10, 2005 (aged 98); New York City, U.S.
- Occupation: Comedian
- Years active: 1930s–1990s

Gene Baylos (November 16, 1906 – January 10, 2005) was an American stand-up comedian whose career spanned the golden age of nightclub comedy. Though largely unknown to the general public, Baylos was admired within the entertainment industry for his quick wit and live performance skills. He was considered a "comedian's comedian," praised by peers such as Alan King, Milton Berle, Jerry Lewis, and George Jessel.

A modest success on television, he performed his stand-up on variety shows, including The Hollywood Palace and The Joey Bishop Show. Baylos appeared on The Dick Van Dyke Show playing a bum who finds a lost TV script, as well as small roles on That Girl; and Car 54, Where Are You?.

== Early life ==
Baylos was born in New York City on November 16, 1906. He grew up in the Bronx and began performing at a young age. Like many Jewish-American comedians of his generation, he developed his act in the Catskill Mountains resorts—known as the Borscht Belt—performing in hotel lounges and nightclubs.

== Career ==
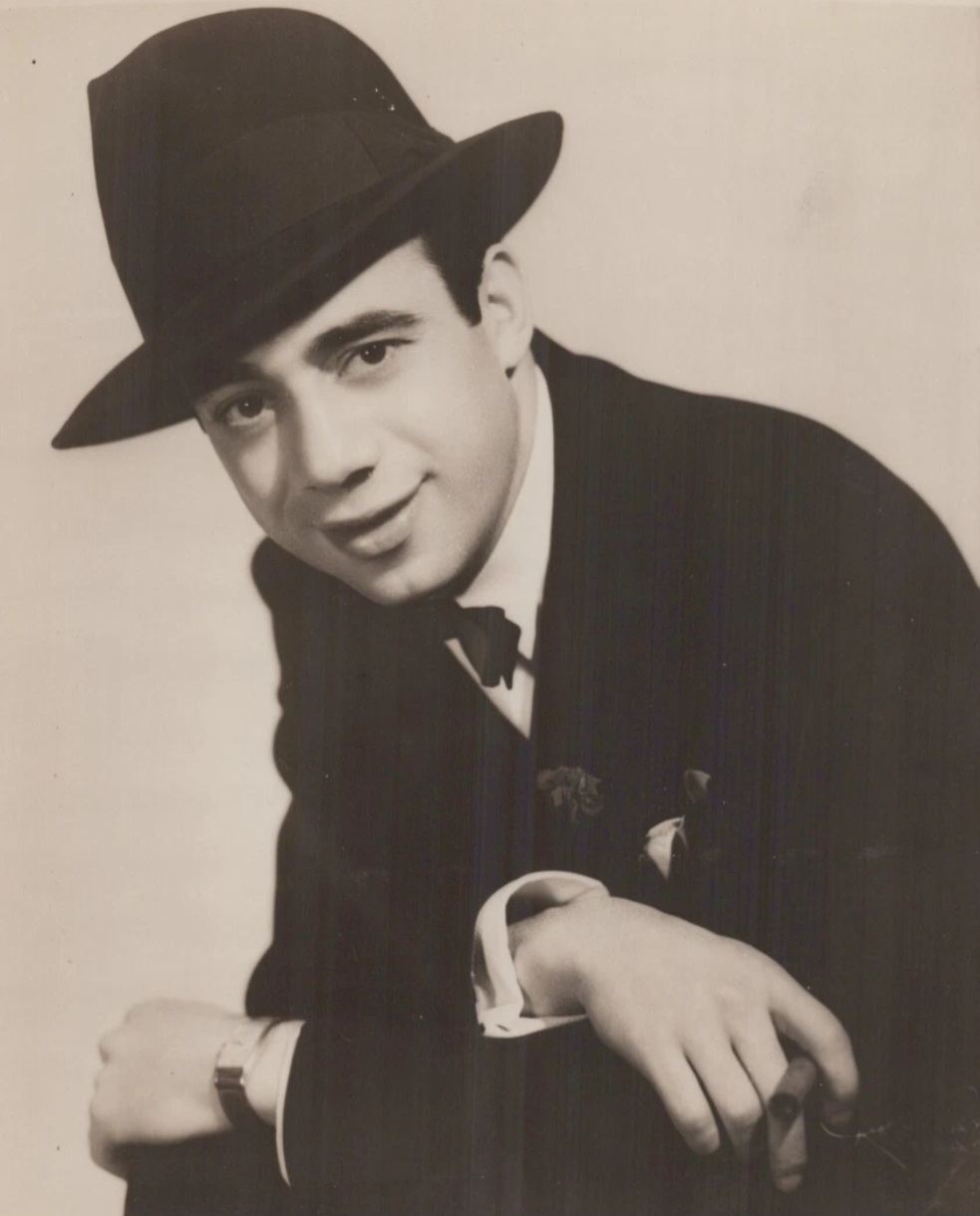
Baylos in 1940

Baylos began appearing in clubs in the 1930s and continued performing for over five decades. A 1947 appearance at the Clover Club in San Francisco billed him as “funnyman Gene Baylos.” In 1948, he was given a farewell party in New York before opening a new show in California.

By the early 1950s, Baylos had become a fixture on the café and nightclub circuit. In 1953 he was described as “everybody’s favorite comedian” and credited him with playing top clubs such as Ciro's, Mocambo, El Rancho Vegas, and La Martinique.

In 1955, he billed as the "Comics' Comic" during a holiday performance at Ciro's in Miami Beach.

In 1957, syndicated columnist Hy Gardner criticized Baylos's approach in multiple columns, accusing him of “slovenly attitude” and insufficient preparation, but still acknowledged him as “one of the funniest, wittiest, and most comical clowns in captivity.”

Despite mixed critical reception, Baylos continued to headline major venues through the 1950s and 1960s. A 1959 performance at the Traymore Hotel in Atlantic City was promoted alongside singer Jacqueline Fontaine.

Baylos remained highly regarded among fellow comedians. In 1968, George Jessel ranked him among the top comics of the time, citing his delivery and audience appeal.

In a 1981 profile, Alan King remarked, “Put him in a room with 20 comedians, and nobody gets a laugh except Baylos.” The same article noted Baylos's long career in clubs like the Friars Club and hotels in Las Vegas and Atlantic City.

Baylos often reflected on his modest fame, telling the Daily News, “When I was making $10 a night doing my act at a movie house and living in the Bronx with my mother, I loved it.”

== Style and legacy ==
Baylos was known for his fast-paced, loose style, often incorporating ad-libs and topical jokes. Though he recorded little material, his comedic instincts influenced a generation of performers, including Jerry Lewis, who cast him in the film The Family Jewels (1965).

His style did not always translate well to television, and by the 1970s, he was considered a relic of the nightclub era. Yet he continued performing well into his 80s, especially at the Friars Club, where he was a long-time fixture and considered its unofficial jester.

== Death ==
Baylos stopped performing in his early 90s after breaking a hip. He died on January 10, 2005, at the age of 98, in New York City.
