= Gerald Hiken =

American actor (1927–2021)

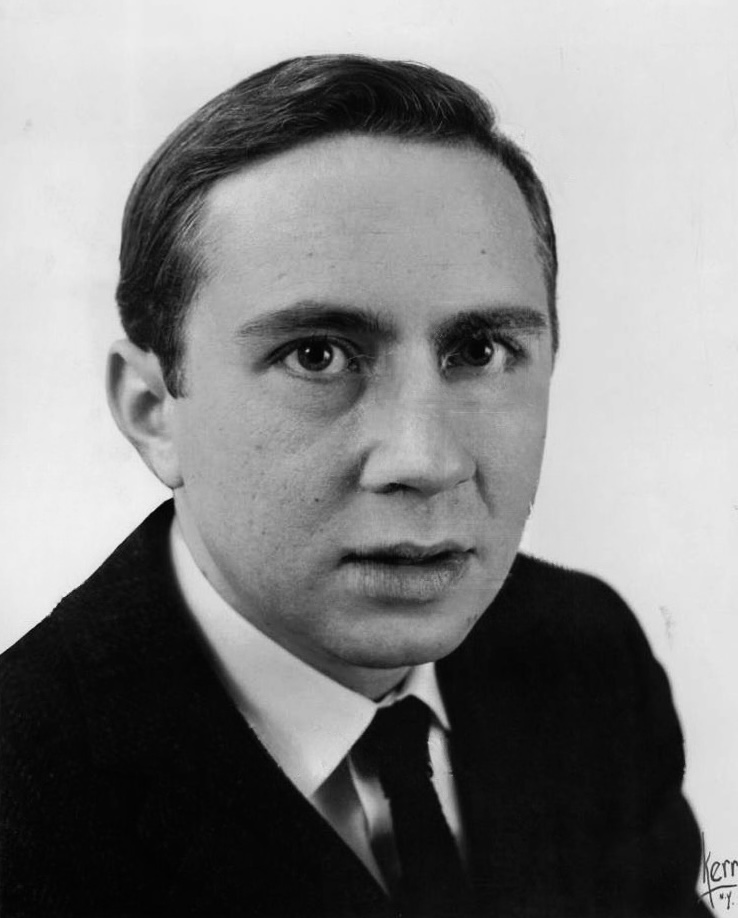
- Hiken in 1958
- Born: May 27, 1927; Milwaukee, Wisconsin, U.S.
- Died: January 6, 2021 (aged 93)
- Occupation: Actor
- Years active: 1957–1989
- Spouse: Barbara Lerner Hiken (m. 1961)
- Children: 2
- Relatives: Nat Hiken (cousin)

Gerald Hiken (May 27, 1927 – January 6, 2021) was an American actor.

== Career ==
A native of Milwaukee, he studied acting at HB Studio in New York City. Hiken was nominated for the Tony Award for Best Actor in a Play in 1980 for his performance in Strider. He has performed in many other Broadway plays and has appeared in supporting and bit roles in various films including The Candidate (1972), Reds (1981), and Fat Man and Little Boy (1989).

On television, Gerald Hiken was a frequent guest star on Car 54, Where Are You?, a show created by his cousin Nat Hiken. In 1988, Gerald Hiken appeared in two consecutive Cheers episodes. He played the character Dennis, father of executive Martin Teale in season 7, episodes 3 and 4: "Executive Sweet" and "One Happy Chappy in a Snappy Serape".

Hiken died on January 6, 2021, at the age of 93.

== Partial filmography ==
Year	Title	Role	Notes
1957	Uncle Vanya	Telegin	
1958	The Goddess	George	
1964	Invitation to a Gunfighter	Gully	
1966	The Three Sisters	Andrei	
1967	Funnyman	Mahlon, Director	
1972	The Candidate	Station Manager	
1972	Fuzz	Painter #2	
1975	Ellery Queen	Alvin Burns	
1976	All in the Family	Frank Edwards	S7.E5: "The Unemployment Story: Part 2"
1981	Reds	Dr. Lorber	
1982	Voyagers!	Bill Sikes	S1.E7: "The Day the Rebs Took Lincoln"
1983	Three's Company	Brody	S8.E3: "The Money Machine"
1985	War and Love	Reb Shulem	
1987	Who's the Boss?	Mr. Crebbin	S4.E4: "A Trip to the Principal"
1989	Fat Man and Little Boy	Leo Szilard	

== Awards and nominations ==
Hiken was nominated for the Tony Award for Best Actor in a Play in 1980 for his performance in Strider.
