= Car 54, Where Are You? =

American sitcom (1961–1963)

- Opening title sequence
- Also known as: Car 54
- Genre: Sitcom; Police comedy
- Created by: Nat Hiken
- Directed by: Al De Caprio; Nat Hiken; Stanley Prager
- Starring: Joe E. Ross; Fred Gwynne
- Theme music composer: Nat Hiken; John Strauss
- Opening theme: "Car 54, Where Are You?"
- Composer: John Strauss
- Country of origin: United States
- Original language: English
- No. of seasons: 2
- No. of episodes: 60 (list of episodes)

Production
- Producers: Nat Hiken; Billy Friedberg
- Cinematography: J. Burgi Contner; George Stoetzel
- Camera setup: Single-camera
- Running time: 30 minutes
- Production company: Eupolis Productions

Original release
- Network: NBC
- Release: September 17, 1961 – April 14, 1963

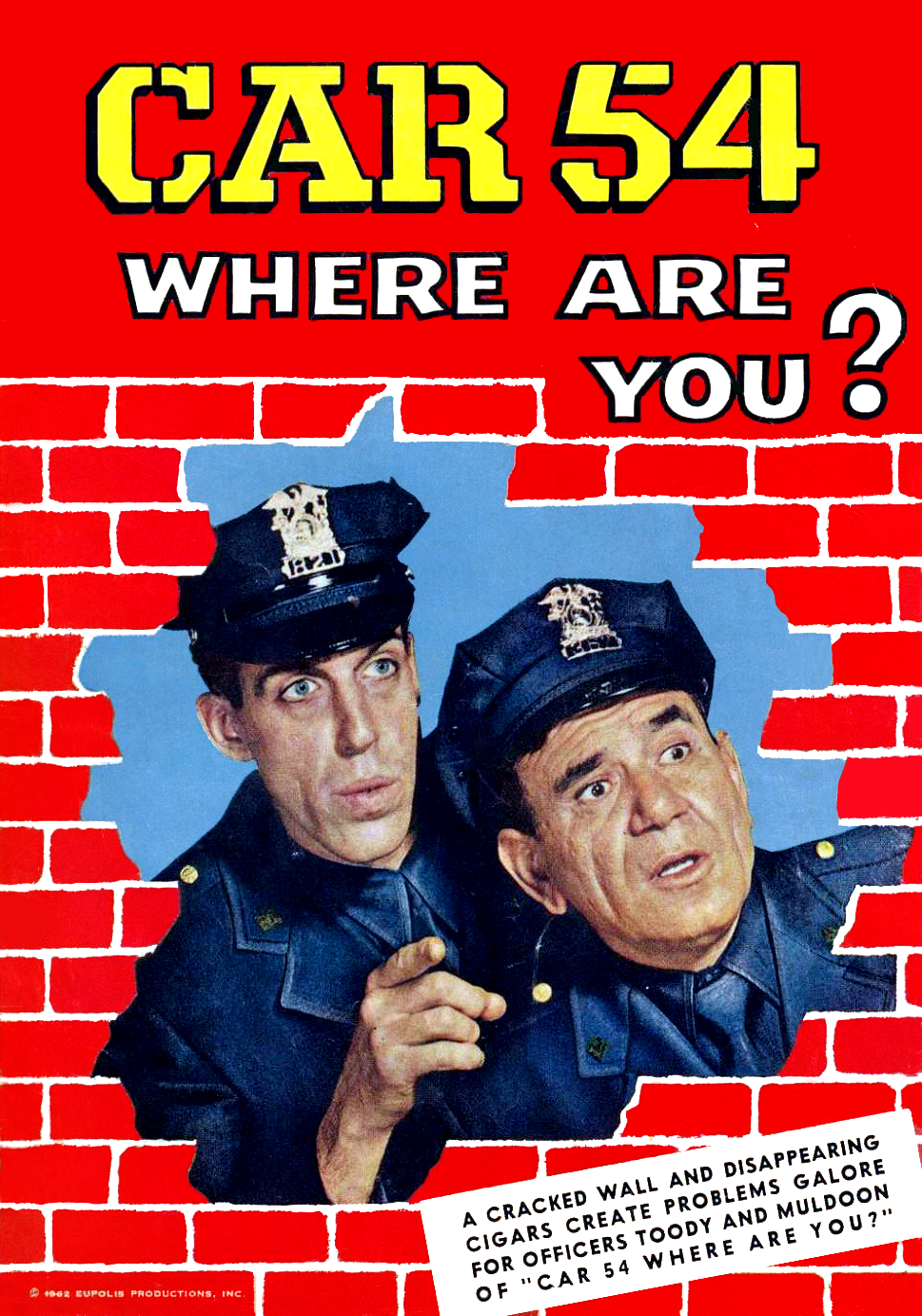
Fred Gwynne and Joe E. Ross

Car 54, Where Are You? is an American sitcom that aired on NBC from September 1961 to April 1963. Filmed in black and white, the series starred Joe E. Ross as Gunther Toody and Fred Gwynne as Francis Muldoon, two mismatched New York City police officers who patrol the fictional 53rd precinct in The Bronx. Car 54 was their patrol car.

The series had a rotating group of directors, including Al De Caprio, Stanley Prager, and series creator Nat Hiken. Filming was done both on location and at Biograph Studios in the Bronx.

== Synopsis ==
The series follows the adventures of New York City Police Department officers Gunther Toody (Joe E. Ross), badge #1432, and Francis Muldoon (Fred Gwynne), badge #723 and #1987 in early episodes, assigned to Patrol Car 54. Toody is short, stocky, nosy, and not very bright, and he lives with his loud, domineering wife Lucille (Beatrice Pons). College-educated Muldoon is very tall, quiet, and more intellectual. A shy bachelor, he lives with his mother and two younger sisters. He is reluctant to get married.

Much of the series is set in the station house, with commanding officer Captain Block (Paul Reed) ordering his men to answer neighborhood police calls or investigate baffling cases that have stymied the force at large. Toody and Muldoon often blunder into these cases, encountering the criminals accidentally and proceeding on a wrong assumption. By sheer perseverance, inadvertence, and luck, Toody and Muldoon bring each case to a successful conclusion.

== Cast ==
- Joe E. Ross as Officer Gunther Toody
- Fred Gwynne as Officer Francis Muldoon
- Beatrice Pons as Lucille Toody
- Al Lewis as Officer Leo Schnauser
- Charlotte Rae as Sylvia Schnauser
- Hank Garrett as Officer Ed Nicholson
- Paul Reed as Capt. Paul Block
- Bruce Kirby as Officer Kissel
- Jimmy Little as Sgt. Jim McBride
- Joe Warren as Officer Steinmetz
- Nipsey Russell as Officer Anderson
- Ossie Davis as Officer Omar Anderson
- Frederick O'Neal as Officer Wallace
- Jim Gormley as Officer Nelson
- Albert Henderson as Officer Dennis O'Hara
- Ruth Masters as Mrs. Muldoon, Francis's mother
- Patricia Bright as Mrs. Claire Block
- Martha Greenhouse as Rose, Lucille's sister
- Nathaniel Frey as Sergeant Abrams
- Jerome Guardino as Officer Antonnucci

== Episodes ==
Season	Episodes	Originally released	
Season	Episodes	First released	Last released
1	30	September 17, 1961	April 22, 1962
2	30	September 16, 1962	April 14, 1963

== Production ==
Many of the scripts were written by Nat Hiken, who won an "Outstanding Directorial Achievement in Comedy" Emmy Award for his work on the series.

Hiken had previously produced The Phil Silvers Show in New York; it was a military comedy with Silvers (as Sgt. Bilko) and his gang of comical soldiers. Hiken recruited many of the Bilko alumni for this new series. Joe E. Ross and Fred Gwynne had featured roles on the Bilko show, and Beatrice Pons was hired to reprise her old role of Ross's wife. Other veterans from the Bilko show were Paul Reed, Al Lewis, Charlotte Rae, Jimmy Little, Jack Healy, Frederick O'Neal, Martha Greenhouse, Bob Hastings, Billy Sands, and Gerald Hiken.

Some supporting players on Car 54 were so well received that they were brought back for additional episodes. Molly Picon played Mrs. Bronson, an enterprising matron who made life miserable for city authorities whom she maneuvered into accommodating her wishes but always adhered strictly to the law. Larry Storch played a gypsy husband, and Charlie, the town drunk, whose constant scrapes with the police compelled Toody and Muldoon to rehabilitate him. Gene Baylos was the hapless Benny the Bookie, whose attempts at swearing off gambling always involved Toody and Muldoon. Carl Ballantine appeared as Al, Toody's imperious brother-in-law, who commanded instant obedience from his wife, Rose (Martha Greenhouse).

Interiors were filmed at Biograph Studios, Inc. at 807 East 175th Street, in The Bronx, New York City, New York. Exteriors of the precinct building were shot outside the Biograph Studios building, within the territory of New York's 48th Precinct.

=== Cars ===
So that they would not be mistaken for actual police cars during location filming, the cars used for the series were painted dark red and white, which appeared as the proper shade of gray on Orthochromatic black-and-white film to replicate NYPD cars of that era, which were black and green, with a white roof and trunk.

Three cars were used as the title vehicle during the series: a 1961 Plymouth Belvedere during most of the first season, followed by a 1962, and later a 1963, Plymouth Savoy.

=== Theme song ===
The theme song's lyrics were written by series creator, writer, and occasional director, Nat Hiken, with music by John Strauss.

There's a holdup in the Bronx,
Brooklyn's broken out in fights;
There's a traffic jam in Harlem
That's backed up to Jackson Heights;
There's a Scout troop short a child,
Khrushchev's due at Idlewild;
Car 54, Where Are You?

The line "Khrushchev's due at Idlewild" refers to Soviet leader Nikita Khrushchev. In September 1960, a year before the series began, Khrushchev flew to New York's Idlewild Airport (now John F. Kennedy International Airport) to attend the United Nations General Assembly.

== Broadcast history ==
Car 54, Where Are You? originally aired Sunday evenings, 8:30–9:00 p.m. on NBC, following Walt Disney's Wonderful World of Color and preceding Bonanza. The network run of Car 54 was sponsored by Procter & Gamble.

== Guest stars ==
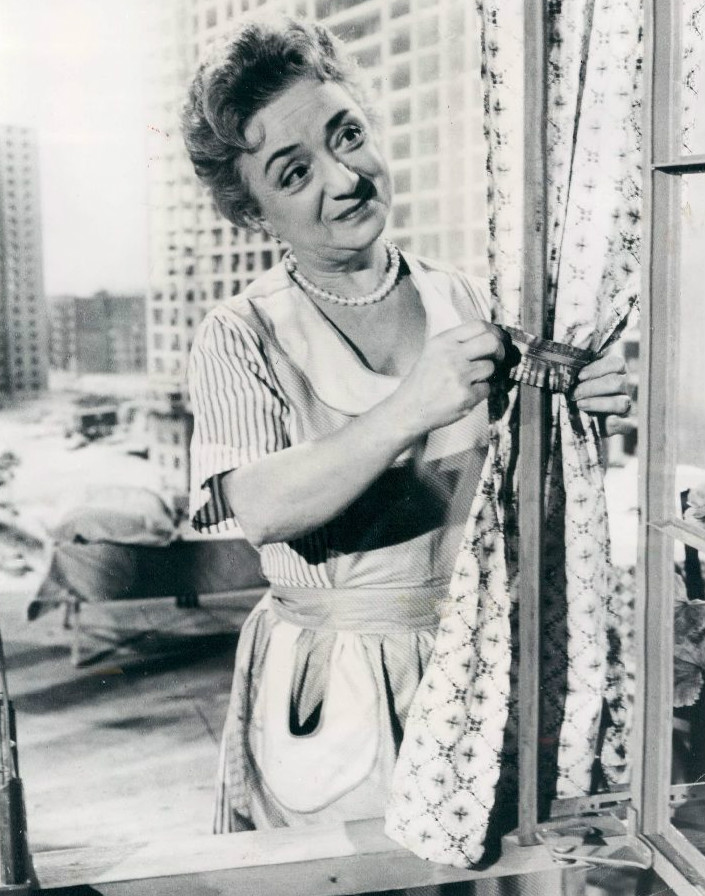
Molly Picon as a guest star in Occupancy, August 1st (1962)

Several New York-based celebrities, including Hugh Downs, Mitch Miller, Jan Murray, and Sugar Ray Robinson, appeared as themselves. Among others cast in various episodes are:

- Carl Ballantine
- Gene Baylos
- Sorrell Booke
- Tom Bosley
- Heywood Hale Broun
- Wally Cox
- Dana Elcar
- Dan Frazer
- Alice Ghostley
- Arlene Golonka
- Bruce Gordon
- Margaret Hamilton
- Bob Hastings
- Katherine Helmond
- Don Keefer
- Jake LaMotta
- Shari Lewis
- Hal Linden
- Judith Lowry
- Simon Oakland
- Molly Picon
- B. S. Pully
- Charles Nelson Reilly
- Jane Rose
- Billy Sands
- Jean Stapleton
- Maureen Stapleton
- Larry Storch

== Primetime Emmy Awards ==
Car 54, Where Are You? was nominated for four Primetime Emmy Awards, earning one.

1961–1962 (presented May 22, 1962)

- Outstanding Directorial Achievement in Comedy: Nat Hiken — Won
- Outstanding Program Achievement in the Field of Humor — Nominated (Winner: The Bob Newhart Show)
- Outstanding Writing Achievement in Comedy: Nat Hiken, Tony Webster, Terry Ryan — Nominated (Winner: Carl Reiner for The Dick Van Dyke Show)

1962–1963 (presented May 26, 1963)

- Outstanding Writing Achievement in Comedy: Nat Hiken — Nominated (Winner: Carl Reiner for The Dick Van Dyke Show)

== Syndication ==
Car 54, Where Are You? was first syndicated by NBC Films in January 1964. It began airing on the cable channel Nick at Nite in 1987 and ran on the network until 1990. It was seen for less than one year on the short-lived Ha! Channel in 1990–1991 and also aired on another Viacom-owned cable channel, Comedy Central, in the early 1990s. In 2016, the show aired early Sunday mornings on MeTV until its removal in September 2017. It also previously aired Monday through Friday on its sister network Decades until Decades was retooled to Catchy Comedy on March 24, 2023, then it made its return to Catchy from January 4, 2025 to February 7, 2026, airing late Saturday nights. It has since returned to the network on June 8, 2026, airing weeknights at 4am ET. It also currently airs on FETV every night at 4:25am ET.

== 1994 film ==
Car 54, Where Are You? was made into a 1994 film, shot mainly in Toronto, starring John C. McGinley as Muldoon, David Johansen as Toody, and Rosie O'Donnell as Toody's wife Lucille. Though made in 1990, it was not released until 1994 due to the bankruptcy of Orion Pictures. Original cast members Al Lewis and Nipsey Russell appeared in the film, which underperformed both critically and commercially upon release.

== Home media ==
In the early 1990s, Republic Pictures Home Video released some episodes on VHS. Shanachie Entertainment announced in late 2010 it was releasing season one on DVD Region 1 on February 22, 2011. The second and final season was released on April 24, 2012.

== In popular culture ==
The show's theme song is parodied as “Mario, Where Are You?” in an Atari commercial for Mario Bros.

In the 1966 film Munster, Go Home! Herman Munster (also played by Fred Gwynne) starts calling for police agencies, eventually yelling, “Car 54, where are you?”

== See also ==
- List of television shows filmed in New York City
