= Nat Hiken =

American film director (1914–68)

- Born: Nathan Hiken; June 23, 1914; Chicago, Illinois, U.S.
- Died: December 7, 1968 (aged 54); Brentwood, Los Angeles, California, U.S.
- Occupations: Writer, producer, director, songwriter
- Relatives: Gerald Hiken (cousin)

Nathan Hiken (June 23, 1914 – December 7, 1968) was an American radio and television writer, producer, and songwriter who rose to prominence in the 1950s.

== Early years ==
Hiken was born on June 23, 1914, in Chicago, Illinois, the son of Jewish parents. At some point, the family moved to Milwaukee, Wisconsin; a 1939 article in a Milwaukee newspaper referred to him as "a well known Milwaukee boy." He worked on the student newspapers at both Washington High School and the University of Wisconsin. After finishing college, he had a brief stint as a writer for United Press International.

Hiken worked for Warner Bros. as a screenwriter beginning in 1940 for the studio's short-subject films. During World War II, Hiken joined the Army Air Force, and although he had a private pilot's license and wanted to be an aviator, the military asked him to produce morale boosting fund-raisers on Broadway. At the end of the war, Hiken left the military to return to being a scriptwriter for Fred Allen, but just as quickly, he was ready to try new things in the new media format of television. He began in television writing scripts for comedian Milton Berle.

== Radio ==
Hiken created and wrote for The Grouch Club and wrote for Fred Allen's hit radio show. Hiken also created, wrote, and directed the NBC radio program "The Magnificent Montague" which aired Friday nights from November 1950 through November 1951.

== Television ==
Hiken moved from radio to become head writer of the early television variety show Four Star Revue. However, in 1950, he was named as a Communist sympathizer in the publication Red Channels, probably because of his mother's outspoken political views. Historian Marc Saul writes that "Hiken had to take out an advertisement in Variety denouncing any communist beliefs. Fortunately, it did the trick."

Hiken is best known for a number of popular TV series during the 1950s and 1960s, including Car 54, Where Are You? and The Phil Silvers Show, a situation comedy set on a US Army post in which Silvers played Sergeant Ernest G. "Ernie" Bilko; the show was also often referred to as Sgt. Bilko (Hiken had originally titled it You'll Never Get Rich).

Hiken, perhaps more so than any TV writer of his era, made certain that his characters were racially and ethnically diverse, a very daring approach considering the era and Hiken's previous run in with HUAC.

Hiken was one of TV's first writer-producers and was the head writer for NBC's Four Star Revue. He moved from radio to TV as a writer for Milton Berle's radio show, which preceded his legendary TV variety show Texaco Star Theater. As a writer for Car 54, Where Are You? and The Phil Silvers Show, he exhibited a comic flair, and his capacity for spoofing such entities as the United States Army, the U.S. government, and police forces was exceptional. TV historians attest to Hiken's talent to create zany but lovable characters and also to his ability to draw strong comedic performances from such unlikely celebrities as boxer Rocky Graziano on NBC's sitcom The Martha Raye Show.

As a producer, Hiken also had an eye for spotting new talent. He is credited with discovering, and advancing the TV careers of, such future stars as Fred Gwynne (1955), Alan Alda (1958)—both made their TV debuts on The Phil Silvers Show—, George Kennedy and Dick Van Dyke (1958). A television pioneer, Hiken worked with Mel Brooks and Woody Allen throughout the 1950s and early 1960s. Hiken won eight Emmy Awards and wrote material for Milton Berle, Bette Davis, Carol Burnett, and Lucille Ball. Larry David, in DVD extras to season 1 of Curb Your Enthusiasm, has spoken about his love of the Bilko series.

Hiken also displayed his musical talent by working with composers George Bassman and Gordon Jenkins on music and theme songs for TV series, and among the songs Hiken himself wrote and composed are "Close to Me", "Irving", and "Fugitive from Fifth Avenue". He also wrote and composed the theme song and music for the TV series, Car 54, Where Are You? Hiken wrote sketches for the Broadway revue, Along Fifth Avenue, for which Gordon Jenkins wrote the music.

Hiken's career, talents, and contributions to the early years of commercial radio and TV are documented in the book King of the Half Hour: Nat Hiken and the Golden Age of TV Comedy, written by David Everitt and published by Syracuse University Press in 2001.

== Death ==
Throughout Hiken's career, he was known for relentless hard work and perfectionism on his shows and his unwillingness to cede control. He handled most aspects of Bilko and Car 54 himself. The stress of his schedule, writing, production and dealing with the foibles of certain actors on each show, combined with a poor diet and heavy smoking, ultimately undermined his physical health. Hiken died of a heart attack on December 7, 1968, in the Brentwood neighborhood of Los Angeles, California, at the age of 54. His last project was the Don Knotts comedy The Love God?, released the year following Hiken's death.

== Family ==
Nat Hiken was the cousin of film and stage actor Gerald Hiken.
