= Naked City (TV series) =

American crime drama television series (1958–1963)

- Genre: Police procedural; Crime drama
- Created by: Stirling Silliphant
- Starring: John McIntire; James Franciscus; Harry Bellaver; Horace McMahon; Paul Burke; Nancy Malone
- Narrated by: Lawrence Dobkin
- Opening theme: "This Is the Naked City" by George Duning (1958–1959); "Somewhere in the Night" by Billy May (1960–1962); "The (New) Naked City Theme" by Nelson Riddle (1962–1963)
- Composers: George Duning (1958–59); Billy May (1960–63); Nelson Riddle (1960–63; incidental music)
- Country of origin: United States
- No. of seasons: 4
- No. of episodes: 138

Production
- Executive producer: Herbert B. Leonard (1962–1963)
- Producers: Herbert B. Leonard; Leo Davis (1962–1963); Charles Russell (1962–1963)
- Running time: 30 minutes (1958–1959); 60 minutes (1960–1963)
- Production companies: Shelle Productions; Screen Gems

Original release
- Network: ABC
- Release: September 30, 1958 – May 29, 1963

Naked City is an American police procedural television series from Screen Gems that aired on ABC from 1958 to 1963. It was inspired by the 1948 motion picture The Naked City and mimics its dramatic semi-documentary format. As in the film, each episode concluded with a narrator intoning the line: "There are eight million stories in the naked city. This has been one of them."

The Naked City episode "Four Sweet Corners" (1959) inspired the series Route 66, created by Stirling Silliphant. Route 66 was broadcast by CBS from 1960 to 1964, and, like Naked City, followed the "semi-anthology" format of building the stories around the guest actors, rather than the regular cast. In 1997, the June 7, 1961 episode "Sweet Prince of Delancey Street" was ranked number 93 on TV Guide's "100 Greatest Episodes of All Time" list.

== Synopsis ==
Filmed on location in New York City, the series concerned the detectives of NYPD's 65th Precinct (changed from the film's 10th Precinct). Episode plots usually focused more on the criminals and victims portrayed by guest actors, characteristic of the "semi-anthology" narrative format common in early 1960s television (so called by the trade paper Variety). For the first season, the primary writer was Stirling Silliphant, who wrote 32 of the season's 39 episodes. Silliphant's work resulted in significant critical acclaim for the series and attracted film and television actors of the time to seek guest-starring roles.

Many scenes were filmed in the South Bronx near Biograph Studios (also known as Gold Medal Studios), where the series was produced, and in Greenwich Village and other neighborhoods in Manhattan. The exterior of the "65th Precinct" was the Midtown North (18th) Precinct, at 306 West 54th Street between Eighth and Ninth Avenues, in the second and the third season, and the current 9th Precinct, at 321 East 5 Street between 1st and 2nd Avenues before it was renovated, in the first and in the fourth seasons.

Naked City was first broadcast during the 1958–59 season, with the title The Naked City, as a half-hour series featuring James Franciscus and John McIntire playing Detective Jimmy Halloran and Lt. Dan Muldoon—the same characters as in the 1948 film (played there by Don Taylor and Barry Fitzgerald). Harry Bellaver played the older, mellow Sgt. Frank Arcaro. For the first season, the narrator (voiced by Lawrence Dobkin) identified himself as "Bert Leonard," claiming to be producer Herbert B. Leonard. While critically acclaimed, the series did not have good ratings. Midway through the season, McIntire quit the show (his character being killed in a car crash with a criminal) because of his desire to leave New York and relocate back to his Montana ranch. He was replaced with Horace McMahon, who was then introduced in the same episode as Muldoon's curmudgeonly replacement, Lieutenant Mike Parker.

The cast change did not help the show's ratings; ABC cancelled Naked City at the end of the 1958–59 season. One of the show's sponsors (Brown & Williamson), along with production staff, successfully lobbied the network to revive the show as an hour-long series, which premiered in 1960. The 1960 version featured Paul Burke as Detective Adam Flint, a sensitive and cerebral policeman in his early thirties. Horace McMahon returned as Lt. Parker as did Harry Bellaver as Sgt. Arcaro. Nancy Malone appeared regularly (for about half the newly produced episodes) as Adam Flint's aspiring actress girlfriend, Libby Kingston. The hour-long version of the show was broadcast by ABC in the 10:00 p.m. slot on Wednesday nights.

For this iteration of the series, writer Silliphant was forced to reduce his involvement considerably, as he was simultaneously working as the main scriptwriter for Route 66 which began in October 1960. Silliphant wrote the first three episodes of Naked City's second season, then did not write any further episodes until he wrote three episodes for season four. Those employed as writers of Naked City episodes during seasons 2, 3 and 4 included veteran TV writer Howard Rodman (who also served as story editor), blacklisted screenwriter Arnold Manoff (writing with the pseudonym "Joel Carpenter"), and Shimon Wincelberg. Noted science-fiction TV writers Charles Beaumont and Gene Roddenberry also each contributed one episode.

== Main cast ==
- John McIntire as Lt. Daniel Muldoon (season 1; 25 episodes)
- James Franciscus as Det. Jimmy Halloran (season 1; 39 episodes)
- Harry Bellaver as Det. Frank Arcaro (seasons 1–4; 136 episodes)
- Horace McMahon as Lt. Mike Parker (seasons 1–4; 110 episodes)
- Paul Burke as Det. Adam Flint (seasons 2–4; 99 episodes)
- Nancy Malone as Libby Kingston (seasons 2–4; 51 episodes)

== Guest stars ==
The series was notable for featuring younger and/or lesser-known/little-known actors, some of whom became major stars, including Alan Alda, Michael Ansara, Edward Asner, Martin Balsam, Barbara Barrie, Orson Bean, Robert Blake, Sorrell Booke, Hildy Brooks, Michael Constantine, Godfrey Cambridge, Joseph Campanella, Diahann Carroll, James Coburn, James Caan, Joan Copeland, William Daniels, Sandy Dennis, Bruce Dern, David Doyle, Keir Dullea, Robert Duvall, Louis Edmonds, Peter Falk, James Farentino, Peter Fonda, Eileen Fulton, Gerald Gordon, Frank Gorshin, Harry Guardino, Gene Hackman, Barbara Harris, Dustin Hoffman, Dennis Hopper, Suzanne Pleshette, Richard Jaeckel, David Janssen, Salome Jens, Jack Klugman, Shirley Knight, Piper Laurie, Carroll O'Connor, George Maharis, John Karlen, Audra Lindley, Jack Lord, Nancy Marchand, Ross Martin, Sylvia Miles, Vic Morrow, Barry Morse, Robert Morse, Lois Nettleton, Leslie Nielsen, Diane Ladd, Susan Oliver, Marisa Pavan, Diana Hyland, Robert Redford, Doris Roberts, Earl Rowe, Mitchell Ryan, Mark Rydell, Telly Savalas, George Segal, William Shatner, Martin Sheen, Jean Stapleton, Rip Torn, Maureen Stapleton, Mel Stuart, Charles Tyner, Cicely Tyson, Brenda Vaccaro, Diana Van der Vlis, Dick Van Patten, Jon Voight, Christopher Walken, Deborah Walley, Richard Ward, Jack Warden, Tuesday Weld, and Dick York.

The show also featured more established and/or better-known actors, including Luther Adler, Eddie Albert, Robert Alda, Kirk Alyn, Louise Allbritton, Richard Basehart, Theodore Bikel, Nancy Carroll, Lee J. Cobb, Gladys Cooper, Hume Cronyn, Ludwig Donath, Diana Douglas, James Dunn, Betty Field, Geraldine Fitzgerald, Nina Foch, Martin Gabel, Peggy Ann Garner, Vincent Gardenia, Eileen Heckart, Ruth Ford, Barnard Hughes, Kim Hunter, Sam Jaffe, Glynis Johns, Kurt Kasznar, Abbe Lane, Eugenie Leontovich, Viveca Lindfors, Al Lewis, Walter Matthau, Myron McCormick, Roddy McDowall, Burgess Meredith, James Mitchell, Jean Muir, Mildred Natwick, Meg Mundy, Cathleen Nesbitt, Jeanette Nolan, Nehemiah Persoff, Claude Rains, Eugenia Rawls, Beatrice Straight, George C. Scott, Aldo Ray, Ruth Roman, Mickey Rooney, Albert Salmi, Sylvia Sidney, Rod Steiger, Jan Sterling, Robert Sterling, Lawrence Tierney, Akim Tamiroff, Jo Van Fleet, Eli Wallach, David Wayne, Jesse White, Cara Williams, Roland Winters, and Keenan Wynn.

Many of the actors listed above played multiple roles for different episodes, as different characters.

Sanford Meisner, the noted acting coach, made a rare celluloid performance in an episode of the series. Acting coach and actress Peggy Feury also made an appearance, in a different episode. Rocky Graziano made an appearance during his relatively brief post-boxing acting career. Actors such as Conrad Bain, Dabney Coleman, Ken Kercheval, Burt Reynolds, and Jessica Walter appeared in minor roles, long before becoming famous.

Several actors played recurring roles, e.g. Suzanne Storrs (as "Janet Halloran" in nine episodes during the series' first version, featuring Franciscus and McIntire), Jimmy Little as "Sgt. Max Higgins", Robert Dryden as "Police Surgeon", and Richard Kronold as "Detective Dutton".

== Episodes ==
Naked City was broadcast for four seasons starting in late 1958. A total of 138 episodes were produced during the four season run.

=== Season 1 (1958–1959) ===
Naked City premiered on ABC as The Naked City on September 30, 1958, with the episode "Meridian". The first season was broadcast as 30-minute episodes from September 1958 to June 1959, consisting of 39 episodes. The series was cancelled after the first season. This original 30-minute version was sponsored by Viceroy cigarettes.

No. overall	No. in season	Title	Directed by	Written by	Original release date
1	1	"Meridian"	Jerry Hopper	Stirling Silliphant	September 30, 1958
Guest stars: Suzanne Storrs as Janet, Alison Marshall as Debbie, Joey Walsh as Lefty, Pat De Simone as Arturo, Harry Kadison as Arcaro, William Zuckert as Donahue, Al Hodge as Johnson, Frank Downing as McGregor, Barbara Banks as Sylvia, Miriam Acevedo as Mrs. Guterraz. When their attempted hold-up goes awry, two teenagers take refuge at a gun show. Notable location: Filmed at the New York Coliseum on Columbus Circle, now the location of the Time Warner Center.
2	2	"Nickel Ride"	Douglas Heyes	Stirling Silliphant	October 7, 1958
Guest stars: Cameron Prud'homme as Captain Flint, Harry Bellaver as Arcaro, John Seven as Biggers, Ralph Stantley as Hagerton, Harry Holcombe as Commissioner, Robert Burr as Driver Armored Car, Ray Singer as Guard Armored Car, Peter Dawson as Bronson. While Lt. Muldoon tries to convince an aging ferry boat captain to retire, a meticulously planned armored car hijacking is taking place below deck. Note: the captain's name is "Adam Flint", the same name as Paul Burke's character when he joins the revamped series in its second season. Notable location: Staten Island ferry.
3	3	"Line of Duty"	Stuart Rosenberg	Stirling Silliphant	October 14, 1958
Guest stars: Eugenie Leontovich as Katina, Harry Bellaver as Arcaro, Suzanne Storrs as Janet, Diane Ladd as Yankee, Paul Lipson as Bartender, Alison Marshall as Debbie, Andrew Gerado as Peter, Nora Ferris as Baby Sitter, William A. Forester as Bailiff. Lt. Halloran tries to cope with the emotional aftereffects of killing a man in the line of duty for the first time. Notable location: Penn Station.
4	4	"Sidewalk Fisherman"	Douglas Heyes	Story by : Meyer Berger; Teleplay by : Stirling Silliphant	October 21, 1958
Guest stars: Harry Bellaver as Arcaro, Jay Novello as Gio Bartolo, Tarry Green as Jocko, Leonardo Cimino as Shellshock, Mark Barkan as Laddie, Gary Morgan as Paulie, Ruth Altman as Mother Superior, Joanna Heyes as Sister, Allen Nourse as Thompson. A man "fishes" for dropped coins from beneath sidewalk grates in hopes of raising enough money to support an orphan. "From a New Yorker story by Meyer Berger". Notable location: Allen Street Public Baths.
5	5	"The Violent Circle"	Douglas Heyes	Stirling Silliphant	October 28, 1958
Guest stars: House Jameson as Morgan, Earl Rowe as Hanson, Robert Weil as Crane, Mark Allen as Greer, Donald Moffat as Brickwell, Janice Mars as Nurse Kaufman, Helm Lyon as Romaine, Jeno Mate as Parker. Halloran goes undercover in a mental ward to find out who killed one of the patients. Notable locations: Welfare (now Roosevelt) Island, Queensborough Bridge elevator.
6	6	"Stakeout"	Stuart Rosenberg	Stirling Silliphant	November 4, 1958
Guest stars: Michael Tolan as Alan Keller, Irene Kane as Betty Keller, Matt Crowley as Commissioner, Jan Miner as Wilma Rogan, Nina Reader as Janie Rogan. Was a detective killed running away from thieves instead of confronting them—or is his partner who survived the confrontation lying? Note: Horace McMahon, who joins the series later in the season as "Lt. Parker" appears in this episode as the head of an anti-theft squad; in the closing credits his character's name is simply "Chief".
7	7	"No More Rumbles"	William Beaudine	Sam Ross	November 11, 1958
Guest stars: Frank Dana as Packy, Sandra Smith as Lucy, David Winters as Marty, Harry Davis as Foreman, Arny Freeman as Cienzi, David Challis as Pancho, Alison Marshall as Debbie Halloran. When a teenager is killed by a rival gang, his friends debate whether to "rumble" with their rivals—or simply murder one of them in revenge.
8	8	"Belvedere Tower"	William Beaudine	Robert Sylvester, John Mackenzie	November 18, 1958
Guest stars: Paul Spencer as Mitchell Pierce, Tom Ahearne as Sgt. Bellows, Dean Almquist as Dodds, Dorothy Dolliver as Evie. A thief poses as a milkman to ransack the apartments of the real milkman's customers while they are on vacation. Notable location: Belvedere Castle in Central Park.
9	9	"The Bird Guard"	William Beaudine	Stirling Silliphant	November 25, 1958
Guest stars: Diana Van der Vlis as Linda Stephenson, John Lawrence as Grubber, Johnny Seven as Brick, Lester Mack as Freeman, John McQuade as Cassidy, Jock MacGregor as Andy. A gangland assassination in a barber shop leads to the fiancée of the gangster who ordered the hit—and a showdown between Halloran and the gangsters in an isolated lighthouse. Notable location: Execution Rocks Light in Long Island Sound.
10	10	"The Other Face of Goodness"	Stuart Rosenberg	Stirling Silliphant	December 2, 1958
Guest stars: Gerald Gordon as Walt Brown, Loretta Leversee as Nova, Arnold Merritt as Jimmy Barrick, David J. Stewart as Professor, Frank Campanella as Cameraman. A disturbed young man is compelled to kill attractive but handicapped women in order to "be somebody"—but the police refuse to believe him when he tries to confess. Notable location: Riverside Church.
11	11	"Lady Bug, Lady Bug"	Stuart Rosenberg	Stirling Silliphant	December 9, 1958
Guest stars: Leon B. Stevens as Eddie Stabler, Peter Votrian as Bobby Stabler, Peter Falk as Extortionist, Daniel Ocko as Julio Marsetti. A tough construction magnate with underworld connections refuses to cooperate with the police when an extortionist threatens his life.
12	12	"Susquehanna 4-7598"	William Beaudine	Stirling Silliphant	December 16, 1958
Guest stars: Frank Campanella as Telephone engineer, Sandy Robinson as Carol Thomas, Paul Valentine as Larry, William Clemens as Johnny Horack. A young woman overhears a murder on her newly installed telephone; the detectives don't believe her story—but the killer does. Notable locations: Rockefeller Center, New York City Incinerator (address unknown).
13	13	"And a Merry Christmas to the Force on Patrol"	Stuart Rosenberg	Stirling Silliphant	December 23, 1958
Guest stars: Frank Sutton as Marco, Michael Strong as Det. Hal Perelman, Rudy Bond as Lt. Mike Daniels, Roberts Blossom as Quint, Jimmy Little as Sgt. Higgins, Mary Boylan as Marie, Richard Kronold as Detective Dutton, Louis Edmonds as Cop in Background. The detectives cross paths with a variety of oddball characters on Christmas Eve—and a pair of dangerous hold-up men.
14	14	"The Explosive Heart"	William Beaudine	Jesse Lasky Jr.	December 30, 1958
Guest stars: Barbara Lord as Laurie White Garcia, Cliff Carnell as Tony Garcia, Noel Leslie as Commander White, Grant Gordon as Dr. Randy Colt. The ne'er-do-well husband of the daughter of a wealthy man plants a bomb on her father's yacht when he threatens to disown them.
15	15	"The Manhole"	John Brahm	Stirling Silliphant	January 6, 1959
Guest stars: Will Kuluva as Mikel Storkich, George Maharis as Stroke Strokich, John Karlen as Chuck, Vic Werber as Leo, Richard Kronold as Detective Dutton. The embittered son of a humble sewer worker plans a heist using those same sewers as a getaway route.
16	16	"Even Crows Sing Good"	John Brahm	Stirling Silliphant	January 13, 1959
Guest stars: Diana Douglas as Hilda Wallace, Bernard Fein as Dasher, Lee Philips as Larry Hinn, Robert Weil as Happy, Jimmy Little as Desk Sergeant, Frieda Altman as Norma Hinn. A meek man seeks vengeance against the bookmaker who brutalized his fiancée.
17	17	"Burst of Passion"	Stuart Rosenberg	Stirling Silliphant	January 20, 1959
Guest stars: Kirk Alyn as Sgt. Muller, John C. Becher as Doctor, Woodrow Parfrey as Andrew Eisert, Matt Crowley as Commissioner, Guy Spaull as Reverend Thomason, Dorothy Peterson as Mrs. Graither, Richard Kronold as Detective Dutton. A quiet neighbor of Detective Halloran and his wife embarks on an inexplicable killing spree. Notable location: Coney Island, including Steeplechase Park.
18	18	"Goodbye, My Lady Love"	John Brahm	Stirling Silliphant	January 27, 1959
Guest stars: James Barton as Matty, William Edmonson as Chain, Louis Guss as Shull, Gilbert Mack as Lombardi, Guy Raymond as Augie, Pat Malone as Harrison, William Baron as Wiper, Eddie Bruce as Barnwell. Circumstantial evidence makes a harmless Bowery derelict appear a murderer, while the actual killer goes undetected—at first... Notable location: Shot at night mostly around the Bowery just south of Houston St. Filmed inside Sammy's On The Bowery (no. 267 made famous by photographer Weegee among others) with owner Sammy Fuchs and noted clientele with a famous Follies performer singing.
19	19	"The Shield"	John Brahm	Stirling Silliphant	February 3, 1959
Guest stars: Jack Klugman as Patrolman Mike Greco, Vic Morrow as David Greco, Gino Ardito as Sneaker, Walter Kinsella as Detective Markham, Vincent Van Lynn as Detective Ted, Margaret Lenert as Mrs. Greco, Sheldon Koretz as Robley. A son wants to follow in his policeman father's footsteps, but refuses to accept the fact he's not up to the task.
20	20	"One to Get Lost"	John Brahm	Sam Ross	February 10, 1959
Guest stars: Kent Smith as George Blake, Jeanette Nolan as Kate, Lawrence Tierney as Mike Johnson, Florence Anglin as Secretary, Norma Crane as Fay Roberts, Charles Gaines as Coroner. When the woman with whom he was having an illicit affair is murdered, a mild-mannered married man seeks the real killer.
21	21	"Hey, Teach!"	Stuart Rosenberg	Stirling Silliphant	February 17, 1959
Guest stars: Bernard Kates as Madison, Jean Muir as Mrs. Kling, Jose Alcarez as Luis, Anthony Franke as Mark, Robert Morris as Flip Willer. Halloran goes undercover at a tough high school to find a teacher's killer.
22	22	"Ticker Tape"	Stuart Rosenberg	Stirling Silliphant	February 24, 1959
Guest stars: Ernest Sarracino as Anton Marshak, Beverly Bentley as Arlene Conway, George Lambert as Hanson, Paul Alberts as Kettleman, Ed Furey as Mason Conway. An embittered man plans to detonate a bomb along the route of an Olympic hero's ticker tape parade.
23	23	"Fire Island"	Norman Tokar	Stirling Silliphant	March 3, 1959
Guest stars: George Maharis as Lundy, Guy Raymond as Boz, Michael Conrad as Hartog, Henry Hull as Alky, Phillip Huston as Lee. Bootleggers running an illicit still on a deserted beach resort in mid-winter resort to violence to protect their operation.
24	24	"Ten Cent Dreams"	John Brahm	Sam Ross	March 10, 1959
Guest stars: Ross Martin as Carlo, Richard X. Slattery as Solid, Al Lewis as Pike, Thelma Pelish as Mrs. Pike, Kay Chaque as Maria. When a simple immigrant wins $6,000 on a lucky bet in the illegal "numbers" game, he's paid off in counterfeit money.
25	25	"The Bumper"	John Brahm	Stirling Silliphant	March 17, 1959
Guest stars: Clement Fowler as Ed "The Bumper" Jenkins, Albert Henderson as Landers, Michael Strong as Det. Hal Perlman, Matt Crowley as Commissioner, Richard Kronold as Detective Dutton, Sam Gray as Doyle. Lt. Parker takes command of the squad when Lt. Muldoon and the gangster he is accompanying to trial are killed by an assassin who uses a car as his murder weapon. Notable Location: the 125th Street Riverside Drive Viaduct, Harlem
26	26	"A Running of Bulls"	Stuart Rosenberg	Stirling Silliphant	March 24, 1959
Guest stars: Michael Ansara as Valente, Felice Orlandi as Luis, Michael Ray as Felipe Piedra, Gloria Marlowe as Nurse Castana. When the innocent son of a cruel dictator comes to New York he is targeted by revolutionaries from his home country.
27	27	"Fallen Star"	Sam Ross	Stirling Silliphant	March 31, 1959
Guest stars: Robert Alda as Jess Burton, Bruno Damon as Manager, Rocky Graziano as Lou Curtis, Arnold Merritt as Larry, Morgan Sterne as Al McBride, Guy Sorel as Harry Weeks. A bellboy tries to protect his idol—a washed-up former football star—when the man is involved in an accidental death at a rigged poker game.
28	28	"Beyond the Truth"	John Brahm	Stirling Silliphant	April 7, 1959
Guest stars: Martin Balsam as Arnold Fleischman, Shawn Donahue as Debbie Halloran, Phyllis Hill as Betty Fleischman, Romo Vincent as Teddy Simpson, Sloan Simpson as Shirley Buchwald, Gerald Price as Max Buchwald, Pat Tobin as Commentator. Halloran tries to prove a man was unjustly convicted of the hit and run death of a child—but the man refuses to accept his help.
29	29	"Baker's Dozen"	George Sherman	Stirling Silliphant	April 14, 1959
Guest stars: Carlos Montalban as Frank Baker, Joseph Ruskin as Johnny Baker, Vincent Gardenia as Crudelli, Richard Jaeckel as Lance, Alex Dayne as Stubbleman. An emotionless hit man comes out of retirement for one last job to kill a gangster about to testify against the mob—then takes Det. Halloran hostage.
30	30	"The Rebirth"	Stuart Rosenberg	Stirling Silliphant	April 21, 1959
Guest stars: Ludwig Donath as Pawnbroker, Betty Sinclair as Ruth Barnaby, John C. Becher as Bank Teller, Anna Appel as Mrs. Lebinsky, Crahan Denton as Superintendent. A scrubwoman robs a bank to buy herself the "dignity" she feels the world has denied her.
31	31	"Four Sweet Corners"	Stuart Rosenberg	Stirling Silliphant	April 28, 1959
Guest stars: George Maharis as Johnny Gary, Robert Morris as Lincoln Ridgeway, Irene Dailey as Mrs. Amy Gary, Rochelle Oliver as Cora Gary, Martha Greenhouse as Evelyn, Mary Perry as Mrs. Gamby, Frank Sutton as Hood. When a soldier returns home and discovers his kid sister has fallen in with a shoplifting ring, he confronts the ringleader in the criminal's lair. This episode was intended to serve as a backdoor pilot for what would eventually develop into the TV series Route 66, which began its run in the fall of 1960. Robert Morris, intended to be the series' co-lead alongside Maharis, died in May 1960.
32	32	"The Sandman"	John Brahm	Louis Salaman	May 5, 1959
Guest stars: Mike Kellin as Ketch, Will Kuluva as Farmer, Vincent Van Lynn as Robbins, Fred Lewis as Maneri. When a punch-drunk former boxer disposes of a body for a gangster to finance his comeback, he accidentally kills a policeman in the process.
33	33	"Turn of Events"	John Brahm	Stirling Silliphant	May 12, 1959
Guest stars: Jan Miner as Mrs. Knauf, Melville Ruick as Harding, Kay Doubleday as Laura Harding, Eugenia Rawls as Mrs. Harding, Irene Cowan as Mrs. Miles. The investigation into the murder of a private eye reveals his corrupt values and leads to an unexpected killer.
34	34	"A Little Piece of the Action"	Stuart Rosenberg	Stirling Silliphant	May 19, 1959
Guest stars: James Barton as Bo Giles, Jan Norris as Doris Giles, Simon Oakland as Duke, Johnny Seven as Al Lacey, Jonathan Gilmore as Jimmy Morgan. A getaway driver past his prime panics when a hold-up goes wrong.
35	35	"The Bloodhounds"	Stuart Rosenberg	Stirling Silliphant	May 26, 1959
Guest stars: Rudy Bond as Lt. Springer, Phyllis Hill as Jane Whitmore, Louis Nye as Drunk, Byron Sanders as Charles Whitmore, Richard Kronold as Detective Dutton, Lynn Whitmore as Janice Manzo. A pair of suspect-tracking bloodhounds wind up in the detectives' custody.
36	36	"The Scorpion Sting"	John Brahm	Stirling Silliphant	June 2, 1959
Guest stars: Nehemiah Persoff as Barney Peters, Diana Douglas as Meg Peters, Clifton James as George Haskell, William Meigs as Matty Dixon, Tamara Daykarhanova as Mrs. Petraloff, Marvin Kline as Charlie Schwartz. A high-powered entertainment executive who has made many enemies begins receiving death threats.
37	37	"Saw My Baby There"	Stuart Rosenberg	Louis Salaman	June 9, 1959
Guest stars: Harold Stone as Simon Beecker, Rochelle Oliver as Katie Harris, Mark Rydell as Ralph Harris, Arny Freeman as Klutz. A man seemingly kills his son-in-law to protect his criminal activities—but the body in the morgue belongs to someone else.
38	38	"The Canvas Bullet"	Stuart Rosenberg	Stirling Silliphant	June 16, 1959
Guest stars: Harry Guardino as Johnny Mills, Diane Ladd as Kathy Mills, Clement Fowler as Gus Slack, Rocky Graziano as Eddie Gibbs, House Jameson as Doc Nearing, Vincent Gardenia as Musso. A gambler takes advantage of a boxer in need of money and encourages him to take on a bout that might kill him.
39	39	"A Wood of Thorns"	Stuart Rosenberg	Stirling Silliphant	June 23, 1959
Guest stars: Cara Williams as Lois Heller. Halloran tries to convince the woman whose fraudulent testimony is about have a man executed to recant.

=== Season 2 (1960–1961) ===
The series was revived as an hour-long show in 1960 with the title Naked City. The first episode of the revived series was "A Death of Princes" and premiered on October 12, 1960. This season ran until June 1961 with 32 episodes.

No. overall	No. in season	Title	Directed by	Written by	Original release date
40	1	"A Death of Princes"	John Brahm	Stirling Silliphant	October 12, 1960
Guest stars: Eli Wallach as Detective Bane, John Baragrey as Teddy Cochrane, George Maharis as Tony Bacallas, Jan Miner as Lia Wallace, Richard Ward as Shoeshine Man, Anne Helm as Diane, Godfrey Cambridge as George, Patricia Bosworth as Laura, Clifton James as Jacoby, Tom Ahearne as Monty, Leonardo Cimino as Johnny, Susan Melvin as Nancy Bacallas, Carla Hoffman as Sarah, Peter Falk as Gimpy, Jimmy Little as Desk Sergeant, Robert Weil as Blinky. A corrupt police detective blackmails people who have committed crimes to help him pull off a big heist.
41	2	"The Pedigree Sheet"	John Brahm	Stirling Silliphant	October 19, 1960
Guest stars: Al Lewis as Gus, Suzanne Pleshette as Nora Condon, Eric Portman as Jayson Condon, Murray Hamilton as D.A. Thomas Stevenson, Roger C. Carmel as Harry Staples, Joseph Bernard as Asst. DA Colby. When his young runaway daughter returns 15 years later a grown woman, her alcoholic father discovers she's now involved with gangsters.
42	3	"A Succession of Heartbeats"	Paul Wendkos	Stirling Silliphant	October 26, 1960
Guest stars: Frank Overton as Andrew Brent, Fay Spain as Felice Reynolds, Felicia Farr as June Walden, Carolyn Leigh as Kathy Linus, Duke Farley as George Silver, William Post, Jr. as Meredith Linus III, Noah Keen as Psychiatrist. The detectives try to discover who killed a playboy with a long list of conquests and his latest girlfriend.
43	4	"Down the Long Night"	Paul Wendkos	Charles Beaumont	November 2, 1960
Guest stars: Leslie Nielsen as Norman Garry, Nehemiah Persoff as Max Evar, Geraldine Brooks as Vicky, House Jameson as Dr. Cogswell, Michael Dolan as Taxi Driver. An embittered man resorts to increasingly dangerous and bizarre methods—including an amusement park house of horrors—to prove a neighbor caused the fire that killed his wife and child. Note: the legendary Wilhelm Scream is heard at appx 48:25 into the episode.
44	5	"To Walk in Silence"	Roger Kay	Barry Trivers	November 9, 1960
Guest stars: Claude Rains as John Weston, Telly Savalas as Gabe Hody, Deborah Walley as Heather Weston, Alan Bunce as Dr. Bill Seaton, Stephen Bolster as Donald Weston, Valerie Cossart as Deborah Weston, Sybil Bowan as Doris, David Kerman as Police Doctor, Sid Raymond as Waiter, Sorrell Booke as Victim. A Wall Street executive tries to hide the fact he witnessed a murder in a gambling parlor and was wounded by a stray bullet.
45	6	"Killer with a Kiss"	Lamont Johnson	Sloan Nibley, Leonard Praskins	November 16, 1960
Guest stars: Burt Brinckerhoff as Erwin Lovegod, Santiago Burgos as Lumpy, Norma Connolly as Ruth Peter, Carmen Mathews as Lily Dancer, George Kane as Policeman #1, Clifton James as Officer Finnelli, Norman Rose as Policeman #2, Tommy Halloran as Hymie, Bill Lazarus as Dr. Arvid. A disturbed young murders policemen to get "revenge" against his deceased war hero father he believes abandoned him.
46	7	"Debt of Honor"	Tay Garnett	William Riley Burnett	November 23, 1960
Guest stars: Steve Cochran as Nick Mori, Warren Finnerty as Frankie Valens, Maurice Tarplin as John Valens, Joseph Kallini as Joey Mori, Lois Nettleton as Marissa Mori, John Frederick as Wally Shaw, Vic Ramos as Gino. A gambler tries to stonewall the police when a player is murdered at his high-stakes poker game—while dealing with the woman who's arrived from his homeland for an arranged marriage.
47	8	"The Human Trap"	Lamont Johnson	Ellis Kadison	November 30, 1960
Guest stars: Maggie O'Neill as Eve Hunter, Ruth Roman as Walda Price, Jack Lord as Cary Glennon, Gene Lyons as Tony Tennant, Zina Bethune as Jessica Glennon, Elizabeth MacRae as Lori, Nick Saunders as Avery Holman. When the daughter of a mobster kills a man attacking her, her controlling mother claims to have committed the crime,
48	9	"The Man Who Bit a Diamond in Half"	Buzz Kulik	Howard Rodman	December 14, 1960
Guest stars: Walter Matthau as Pete Kanapolis, Elizabeth Allen as Emily Kanapolis, Luther Adler as Sean Wicklow, Michael Conrad as Pierce, Patrick Waddington as Mitchem, Michael Shillo as Koersel, James Tolkan as Mail Clerk, Charles Randall as Mellen. A successful, uncultured man discovers his trophy wife is selling the expensive jewelry he is giving her and wearing substitutes in their place.
49	10	"Bullets Cost Too Much"	Buzz Kulik	Samuel Marx	January 4, 1961
Guest stars: Dick York as Dr. Charles Colano, Johnny Seven as Paul Colano, Betty Field as Mrs. Brent, James Caan as Marty Feketi, Bruce Dern as Nicky, Paul Hartman as Brent, Jean Stapleton as Mrs. Ferguson, Barbara Lord as Nurse Vale, Frank Campanella as Lieutenant, Matt Crowley as Bucky. Flint is accused of cowardice when he refrains from pulling his gun on robbers to protect bystanders.
50	11	"Murder is a Face I Know"	Arthur Hiller	Howard Rodman	January 11, 1961
Guest stars: Theodore Bikel as Nicholas Ross/Roginsky, Keir Dullea as Joey Ross, David J. Stewart as Solly Dillman, Malachi Throne as Dillman's Hood, David Doyle as Coach Moore, Peggy Feury as Tolya Ross, Edmon Ryan as Dillman's Attorney, Paul Ballantyne as Minister. A teenager is shocked to discover his beloved dad is a gangland assassin.
51	12	"Landscape with Dead Figures"	Elliot Silverstein	Barry Trivers	January 18, 1961
Guest stars: Myron McCormick as Albert Blakely, Alfred Ryder as Carl Blakely, Conrad Nagel as Dan Dennison, Robert Emhardt as Dr. Wolfgang Krode, Roger C. Carmel as Fitch, Jim Boles as Sorin, Rosalyn Newport as Elizabeth Blakely, George Ebeling as Gardener, Dabney Coleman as Resident. A celebrated painter who has been locked away in a mental asylum tries to reclaim his identity.
52	13	"A Hole in the City"	David Lowell Rich	Howard Rodman	February 1, 1961
Guest stars: Robert Duvall as Louis Nunda, Edward Asner as Vince Busti, Lou Antonio as Al Machias, Olga Bellin as Jeanne Clinton, Sylvia Sidney as Aunt Florence, Jamie Smith as Jay Plessus, Edward Simon as Cop #1, Richard X. Slattery as Cop #2, Audra Lindley as Neighbor. In the shadow of Yankee Stadium a desperate criminal holds his aunt and her neighbors hostage as the police close in.
53	14	"The Well-Dressed Termite"	Unknown	Jay Dratler	February 8, 1961
Guest stars: Jack Klugman as Sam Braden, John Baragrey as David Fairport, Mitchell Ryan as Marty Minters, Philip Abbott as Charles Alvis, Norma Crane as Lily Braden, Fred J. Scollay as Joe Corley, House Jameson as Williams, Dick Van Patten as Carhop, Richard Kronold as Detective Dutton The deliberate electrocution of a wiretapper eavesdropping on phone conversations by his partner reveals a tangled web of romantic obsession and corporate espionage.
54	15	"The Day It Rained Mink"	David Lowell Rich	Howard Rodman	February 15, 1961
Guest stars: Keenan Wynn as Maxwell Ronan, Abbe Lane as Estelle Reeves, Henry Lascoe as William Saxer, Sorrell Booke as Uncle George, Timmy Everett as Burt Ronan, Arny Freeman as Salesman, Daniel Ocko as Arthur Warfield, Jerry Jarrett as Moving Man, Perry Wilson as Betty Ronan, Tarry Green as Sidney, Mary James as Designer, Richard Kronold as Detective Dutton. The owner of a company manufacturing linings for fur coats has second thoughts about his plan to rob his own company.
55	16	"Button in the Haystack"	Tay Garnett	Howard Rodman	February 22, 1961
Guest stars: Albert Salmi as Len Brewer, Peggy Ann Garner as Edie Brewer, Mitchell Ryan as Overton, Joseph Bernard as Asst. DA Colby, Robert Weil as Nesvady, Doris Rich as Mrs. Jassy, Christopher Barbieri as Livny, Muriel Franklin as Dierdre, Phoebe Mackay as Mrs. McDade, Joe Warren as Sean Ross. When a man is found shot to death at a gas station the paroled convict working at the station fears he will be arrested for the crime.
56	17	"Shoes for Vinnie Winford"	Elliot Silverstein	Ellis Kadison	March 1, 1961
Guest stars: Dennis Hopper as Vinnie Winford, Meg Mundy as Rosalind Winford, Sylvia Miles as Ginger Barr, Geoffrey Lumb as Rufus Cates, Hilda Brawner as Ruby Redd, Jack Bittner as Luther, Nancy Stone as Diana Rand, Bill Lazarus as Dr. Gregg, George L. Smith as Engineer. The pressure of managing his late father's corporation drives his young son to madness—and murder.
57	18	"The Deadly Guinea Pig"	William Graham	Jay Dratler	March 8, 1961
Guest stars: Barry Morse as Dr. Paul Multer, George Voskovec as Johan von Bunow, Eugenie Leontovich as Mama Kelle, Mike Kellin as Anton, Viveca Lindfors as Lulu Kronen, Peter Turgeon as Bob Tower, Brad Herrman as Holbey. A murder and robbery involving a woman dressed as a policeman leads to a deadly rivalry between former Nazi SS officers. Note: There is no opening narration to this episode.
58	19	"Vengeance is a Wheel"	Elliot Silverstein	Gilbert Ralston	March 15, 1961
Guest stars: Brett Somers as Mrs. Garvin, Ben Piazza as Nino Licosa, Paul Stevens as Mario Licosa, Frank Marth as Albert Garvin, Richard Casey as Pietro Vinton, Allen Joseph as Gerth, Susan Melvin as Jennie Licosa, Dino di Luca as Joseph Licosa, Jacqueline Bertrand as Henriette, Pierre Epstein as Paul DeLage, Gerry Jedd as Marta Licosa, Aristede Sigismondi as Don Pugnacio. The hunt for a robbery ring targeting valuable items stored in waterfront warehouses leads to a conflicted Italian family.
59	20	"The Fault in Our Stars"	William Graham	Barry Trivers	March 22, 1961
Guest stars: Roddy McDowall as Donnie Benton, Mary Fickett as Norma Sutter, Patricia Bosworth as Betty Harkness, Florence Anglin as Mrs. Purely, Alvin Epstein as Elliot Kesbeck, Louise Larabee as Mrs. Benton, Victor Thorley as Landlord, Bruce Dern as Hollis. An out-of-work actor resorts to murder to support himself when his career stalls.
60	21	"Tombstone for a Derelict"	Elliot Silverstein	Howard Ehrenman	April 5, 1961
Guest stars: Robert Redford as Baldwin Larne, William Hinnant as Fred, Don Gentry as Charlie, Polly Rowles as Mrs. Larne, Dal Jenkins as Josh, Robert Allen as Roger Larne, Sam Capuano as ADA Angelo. Four young men murder derelicts and don Nazi uniforms to "make a statement" about society.
61	22	"A Memory of Crying"	Alex March	David Chantler, Howard Rodman	April 12, 1961
Guest stars: Luther Adler as Willard Manson, Betty Field as Mrs. Kater, Susan Oliver as Jessica Manson, Philip Abbott as Doctor, Thomas A. Carlin as Willard Banes, Frieda Altman as Mrs. Howard, Martine Bartlett as Receptionist. A lawyer turns delusional and refuses to believe his wife died in childbirth, embarking on a crime and gambling spree to pay for the deluxe hospital accommodations he imagines she deserves.
62	23	"New York to L.A."	Elliot Silverstein	Howard Rodman	April 19, 1961
Guest stars: Martin Balsam as Caldwell Wyatt, Frank Sutton as Franklin Maquon, Edward Asner as Vince Busti, Than Wyenn as Judge Lakewood, Robert Blake as Knox Maquon, Oliver McGowan as Oscar Keswick, Noah Keen as Deputy DA Smith, Richard Shannon as Prestwick, Jon Lormer as Minister, Margo Lundgreen as Eve Busti. Detective Flint travels to Los Angeles to extradite two criminals to New York.
63	24	"A Very Cautious Boy"	William Graham	Gilbert Ralston	April 26, 1961
Guest stars: Peter Falk as Lee Staunton, Ruth White as Mama Ganoulian, William Hansen as Joe Ganoulian, Jeremiah Morris as Emile, Bert Sargent as Roy Baxter, William Duell as Desk Clerk, Mary James as Mrs. Schlesinger, Macha Méril as Gaby Duclos. A man trained in karate uses his skills to murder a gangster threatening the elderly owners of his favorite restaurant.
64	25	"An Economy of Death"	Boris Sagal	Sy Salkowitz	May 3, 1961
Guest stars: Sam Jaffe as Laszlo Lubasz, Leonardo Cimino as Miklos Konya, Sandor Szabo as Gyula Janza, Lilia Skala as Anna Bognar, Lotta Palfi as Maria Lubasz, Muni Seroff as Zoltan Bognar, Lidia Prochinka as Pauline Jansa, Dirk Kooiman as Giorgi Bognar, Bettye Ackerman as Susan Bognar. An elderly couple trying to locate their daughter in Communist-controlled Hungary are swindled by a con artist pretending to know her whereabouts.
65	26	"C3H5(NO3)3"	William Graham	Gilbert Ralston	May 10, 1961
Guest stars: Hume Cronyn as James Fallon, J. D. Cannon as Tom Keary, Terry Carter as Jack Lubin, Doreen Lang as Martha Fallon, Lou Herbert as Bartender, Brandon Maggart as Sailor. An absent-minded chemistry professor creates a batch of nitroglycerin—and forgets where he left it.
66	27	"Make-Believe Man"	Elliot Silverstein	Sy Salkowitz	May 17, 1961
Guest stars: Nehemiah Persoff as Carlos Roldan, Eduardo Ciannelli as Don Miguel Cordura, Jay Novello as Juan Manguardo, Leonardo Cimino as Julio Verrace, Chester Morris as Frank Manfred, Victor Janquera as Dr. Miguel Cabiro, Remo Pisani as Juan Perez, Sam Gray as Officer Sam Gode, William Beach as Bum #1, Lester Mack as Bum #2, David Greer as Bum #3. An alcoholic derelict with a strong resemblance to a foreign leader is trained to be a stand-in for the man to help spark a revolution.
67	28	"To Dream Without Sleep"	William Graham	Barry Trivers	May 24, 1961
Guest stars: Lois Nettleton as Fran Burney, Fred J. Scollay as Al Horner, Edward Holmes as Max, Bibi Osterwald as Sylvia, Valerie Bettis as Mildred, William Cottrell as Lab Technician, Dortha Duckworth as Mrs. Lowell, Gerry Jedd as Mrs. Horner, Joseph Warren as Surgeon. In a moment of passion a lonely woman stabs the man dating her when she discovers he's married, then goes on the run believing she's killed him.
68	29	"A Kettle of Precious Fish"	William Conrad	Gilbert Ralston	May 31, 1961
Guest stars: Albert Dekker as Samuel Grafton, Gerald Hiken as Doc Fraley, David J. Stewart as Harry Lapen, Russell Collins as Joseph Peavey, Joanna Roos as Mrs. Peavey, Woodrow Parfrey as George Butterwick, James Luisi as Mark Andrews, Jamie Smith as Babe Manning, George Mitchell as Al Spangler, Anthony Dawson as Mike Grundy, George L. Smith as Doctor, Anna Minot as Mrs. Bexley, Carl Frank as John Forks, William Daniels as Herbert. A criminal gang commandeers a yacht to hold well-to-do business executives hostage for ransom. Notable location: an extensive scene photographed in New York City's since-demolished Pennsylvania Station.
69	30	"Sweet Prince of Delancey Street"	Alex March	Sy Salkowitz	June 7, 1961
Guest stars: James Dunn as Peter Wilkins, Robert Morse as Richie Wilkins, Jan Miner as Rosie Wilkins, Dustin Hoffman as Lester Stinton, Herb Voland as Charlie Bates, Arny Freeman as Atherton, Ted Cory as Polonius, Ann Dee as Queen, Chris Robinson as Policeman. A father and son both claim responsibility for killing a watchman during a jewel robbery. In 1997, TV Guide ranked this episode number 93 on its list of the "100 Greatest Episodes of All Time".
70	31	"The Day the Island Almost Sank"	William Conrad	Jerry Thomas	June 14, 1961
Guest stars: Paul Hartman as Ben Stringfellow, Roger C. Carmel as Al Buxley, Sam Gray as Detective Goad, Anita Dangler as Myra Wolinsky, Mickey Freeman as Irvin Wolinsky, Matt Crowley as Commissioner Buckley, Sam Capuano as ADA Angelo, Robert Weil as Prisoner, Conrad Bain as Chamber of Commerce Man. The only witness to the brutal murder of a convention-goer is the security guard who committed the crime.
71	32	"Take and Put"	Elliot Silverstein	Arnold Ellis, Howard Rodman	June 21, 1961
Guest stars: Roland Winters as Aubrey Hacker, Nancy Carroll as Bernice Hacker, William Hinnant as Willis Hacker, Mildred Natwick as Irma Mahoney, Peter Turgeon as Thomas Yale, Joyce Bulifant as Connie Hacker, Fred Stewart as John Thor, Joe Silver as Asst. D.A. Ketton, Erik Rhodes as Gandel. The mastermind behind the jewel robberies that keep a once wealthy, now impoverished upper-class family afloat... is their maid.

=== Season 3 (1961–1962) ===
The third season of Naked City premiered on September 27, 1961, with the episode "Take Off Your Hat When a Funeral Passes". This season ran through June 1962 and comprised 33 episodes.

No. overall	No. in season	Title	Directed by	Written by	Original release date
72	1	"Take Off Your Hat When a Funeral Passes"	Jules Bricken	Howard Rodman, Anthony Spinner	September 27, 1961
Guest stars: Lee J. Cobb as Paul Delito, Geraldine Fitzgerald as Brigid Delito, Joseph Campanella as Detective Dutton, Alfred Ryder as John Birge, Tommy Norden as Paul Delito, Jr. Lt. Parker pressures a mentally unstable man to once again inform on his criminal brother. Notable Location: Beneath the Manhattan side of the Manhattan Bridge
73	2	"Dead on the Field of Honor"	Jack Smight	Betty Andrews	October 4, 1961
Guest stars: Joseph Campanella as Detective Dutton, Arlene Golonka as Alma Corgi, Cathleen Nesbitt as Helene Choiseul, Logan Ramsey as Beau Choiseul, Jeremy Slate as Chuck Mullford, Ann Williams as Vivianne Choiseul, Jared Reed as Pete Mardis, Ruth Volner as Spokeswoman, Edward Lane as Ice Cream Vendor, Patricia Keefer as Jenny. A man living a fantasy world of chivalry becomes a menace to those he sees as dishonorable.
74	3	"The Corpse Ran Down Mulberry Street"	Alex March	Jo Pagano	October 11, 1961
Guest stars: Nehemiah Persoff as Dominic Venussi, Sorrell Booke as Salvatore Rogero, Joe De Santis as Matt Valentine, John Ramondetta as Angelo Venussi, Al Lewis as Harry McGoglan, Andrew Gerado as Lou, Wendy Waring as Angelina Venussi, Brenda Vaccaro as Rosa Alloro, Sally Gracie as Gracie, Teno Pollick as Anders, Dino Terranova as Alloro. An illegal immigrant smuggling racket and a drug ring are exposed when a man in a coffin turns out to be very much alive. Notable location: Filmed inside and outside of Lanza's Italian Restaurant (opened in 1904 and closed in 2016) on 10th Street and 1st Avenue and along 1st Avenue.
75	4	"The Fingers of Henri Tourelle"	Arthur Hiller	Ernest Pendrell	October 18, 1961
Guest stars: Luther Adler as Henri Tourelle, Nina Foch as Maude Hamilton, Attilia Barbato as Tailor, Jerome Cowan as Carl Terris, Henry Lascoe as Bertrand Rosebrook, Robert Loggia as Ben Tourelle, Michael Tolan as Peter Morrell, Patricia Wheel as Carol Fleishcman, Louis Sorin as Presser, Betty Walker as Forewoman, Richard Ward as Packer. When the head of a fashion studio is found shot to death, almost every one of his underlings had a motive to kill him.
76	5	"A Wednesday Night Story"	Arthur Hiller	Howard Rodman, Jerome Ross	November 1, 1961
Guest stars: Ulla Jacobsson as Karen Gunnarson, David Janssen as Blair Cameron, Constance Ford as Rhonda Cameron, Murray Matheson as Colley, Sorrell Booke as Private Detective, Matt Crowley as Deputy Commissioner, Ernest Graves as Lawyer #1, Noam Pitlik as Lawyer #2, Tommy Battreall as Danny Cameron, Mary Hayden as Maid. The au pair looking after a wealthy family's son fears for the boy's safety after overhearing his parents' violent arguments—and has a secret of her own.
77	6	"The Tragic Success of Alfred Tiloff"	Alex March	Howard Rodman	November 8, 1961
Guest stars: Jack Klugman as Alfie Tiloff, Jan Sterling as Myrtle Tiloff, Dino di Luca as Alessandro Corbello, Fred J. Scollay as Marty Parlin, Ruth White as Mary Nagler, Gerry Jedd as Dora Baggett, Helen Norden as Elly Baggett, Robert Arnold as Candy Store Man. A domineering wife convinces her reluctant husband to kidnap a little girl for ransom.
78	7	"Which is Joseph Creeley?"	Arthur Hiller	Gilbert Ralston	November 15, 1961
Guest stars: Martin Balsam as Joseph Creeley, Murray Hamilton as ADA Matt Orman, Jack Kruschen as Dean Fairland, Woodrow Parfrey as Dr. Manning Wirtz, Bill Gunn as Norbert, Audra Lindley as Mrs. Creeley, Than Wyenn as Judge, Maureen Drew as Nurse, Ruth Newton as Julie Millis. A man scheduled to be executed for murder gets a new trial after a tumor is removed from his brain, erasing his memory and changing his personality.
79	8	"Show Me the Way to Go Home"	William Graham	Shimon Wincelberg	November 22, 1961
Guest stars: Burt Brinckerhoff as Danny Keeling, Lois Nettleton as Marie Mannini, Louise Allbritton as Elva Keeling, Douglas Rodgers as Chuck, Celia Adler as Old Woman, Martha Greenhouse as Woman, Carmen Costi as Pharmacist, Carl Reindel as Shag, Albert Viola as Cab Driver, Rose Gregorio as Puerto Rican Woman, Charles Dierkop as Card Player. An unbalanced young man accompanies the woman he is obsessed with on an odyssey to find shelter for a homeless elderly woman. Notable location: Shot around The Cooper Union, Cooper Square and the Bowery.
80	9	"The Hot Minerva"	Paul Wendkos	Ernest Kinoy	November 29, 1961
Guest stars: Kurt Kasznar as Alcibiades, Glynis Johns as Miss Arlington, Gerald Hiken as Arthur Gerald, William Redfield as Phillip Weaver, Mitchell Ryan as Quayle, Rebecca Sand as Laura, Johnny Seven as Stitch, Jamie Smith as Marty, Sorrell Booke as Doctor, Graham Velsey as Henry, Brandon Maggart as Mullet, Eugene Roche as Plainclothes policeman, Chris Robinson as Detective on Bus. Two would-be criminals steal a priceless statue in hopes of selling it to a wealthy collector—and find themselves way over their heads. Notable Location: 79th Street Boat Basin
81	10	"Requiem for a Sunday Afternoon"	Paul Nickell	Howard Rodman	December 6, 1961
Guest stars: Jay Novello as Anthony Scarzi, Marisa Pavan as Josephine Scarzi, Augusta Merighi as Mrs. Ametto, Burt Reynolds as Defenestrated Guy, Sam Capuano as Priest, Jeff Harris as Fred. A middle-aged shoemaker struggles to understand his much younger, and very unhappy wife. Notable location: Park scenes were filmed at The New York Botanical Garden in the Bronx.
82	11	"Ooftus Goofus"	Arthur Hiller	Jo Pagano, Howard Rodman	December 13, 1961
Guest stars: Mickey Rooney as George Bick, Maureen Stapleton as Abby Bick, Don Briggs as Jerry Bagger, Joseph Warren as Sam, Louis Sorin as Old Man, Graham Jarvis as Manager, Roland Wood as Kibitzer. A frustrated, ignored man vents his anger against society with anonymous letters to the newspapers, and bizarre—and increasingly dangerous—pranks.
83	12	"Bridge Party"	William Conrad	Gilbert Ralston	December 27, 1961
Guest stars: James Barton as Tom Dobbins, Fred Clark as Grainger, Albert Dekker as Herbert Warick, Ruth McDevitt as Abbie Dobbins, Joe Sweeney as Jacob Morrison, Dan Tobin as Charles Banning, House Jameson as Donald Chavers, Monroe Arnold as Ben Fenton, Chanin Hale as Miss Webb. An elderly man challenges a railroad company when they refuse to honor an agreement made long ago with his family.
84	13	"The Face of the Enemy"	William Graham	Lou Shaw, Peggy Shaw	January 3, 1962
Guest stars: Jack Warden as Neil Daggett, Eileen Fulton as Janie Daggett, Conrad Fowkes as John, Kim Hunter as Edna Daggett, Sorrell Booke as Hawk, Ralph Stantley as Hank, Sylvia Miles as Barfly, Joseph Reardon as Davey Daggett. An unbalanced World War II hero unable to put his life back together goes on a killing spree.
85	14	"Portrait of a Painter"	David Lowell Rich	Mel Goldberg, Howard Rodman	January 10, 1962
Guest stars: William Shatner as Roger Barner, Theodore Bikel as Dr. Stanley Wilford, Barry Morse as Silliphant, Lou Antonio as Ernie, Edward McNally as Doorman, Len Birman as Dr. Clyde, Edward Lane as Waiter. When an artist awakes and finds his wife murdered, he believes he committed the crime.
86	15	"The Night the Saints Lost Their Halos"	Elliot Silverstein	Abram S. Ginnes	January 17, 1962
Guest stars: Jo Van Fleet as Dr. Anna Chaloupka, Martin Sheen as Phil Kasnick, George Voskovec as Jack Selken, Peter Fonda as Joey Selken, Eli Mintz as Watchman, Janet Fox as Female Patient, Charles Bolender as Mugasha. When the son of a close friend is involved with a robbery, a woman doctor tries to shield him from the law. Notable Locations: Coney Island, Steeplechase Park
87	16	"The Contract"	Paul Mitchell	Howard Rodman	January 24, 1962
Guest stars: Khigh Dhiegh as Wong, Pilar Seurat as Lotus Tze, James Shigeta as James Kam, Abraham Sofaer as Ling Tsiang, Bill Lazarus as Smith, Conrad Yama as Busboy, Robert Allen as Chief Attorney, Edward Chan as Cook, Robert Weil as Bettor, Carl York as Assistant D. A. When a young Chinese woman is found dead, both her suitors claim responsibility for her murder. Notable Locations: Chinatown, Manhattan, Queensboro Bridge
88	17	"One of the Most Important Men in the Whole World"	Paul Nickell	Howard Rodman	January 31, 1962
Guest stars: Jennifer Billingsley as Helen, Richard Conte as Phil Clifford, Myron McCormick as Christian Marlow, Eugene Roche as ADA Smith, Anne Seymour as Beatrice Shaw, William Traylor as Melvin Shaw, Brad Herrman as Allen Clifford, Barnard Hughes as Judge, Doris Roberts as Miss Tresan, John D. Seymour as Ryas. A gangster tries to bribe, then intimidate a teacher into giving his son a passing grade. (Note: this episode does not feature an opening narration.)
89	18	"A Case Study of Two Savages"	William Graham	Frank R. Pierson	February 7, 1962
Guest stars: Rip Torn as Ansel Boake, Tuesday Weld as Ora Mae Youngham, Audra Lindley as Mrs. Youngham, William Cottrell as Lab Technician, Russell Hardie as Sheriff Fulcher, Rosetta Bain as Mrs. Arcaro, Joseph Beruh as Joe Arcaro, Pat Malone as Riley, Charles Dierkop as Junkyard Worker. In an episode inspired by Charles Starkweather's 1959 killing spree (which is mentioned in the episode), a backwoods couple leave a trail of murders behind when they arrive in Manhattan and shoot Sgt. Arcaro.
90	19	"Let Me Die Before I Wake"	Paul Nickell	Abram S. Ginnes	February 14, 1962
Guest stars: Jack Klugman as Joe Galageras, James Farentino as Ben Galageras, Michael Constantine as Vito Galageras, Louis Guss as Angelo, Joanne Linville as Rosie Galageras, Paul Stevens as Nick Corvine, Albert Viola as Phil, Sheila Copelan as Carol Felster, Tresa Hughes as Mother, Dorothy Rice as Jane, Arnold Soboloff as Attuzzi, Charles White as Priest, Sorrell Booke as Detective. A hit-and-run attempt on a beloved neighborhood figure suffering from agoraphobia reveals a web of suspicion and unfaithfulness.
91	20	"To Walk Like a Lion"	Robert Gist	Howard Rodman	February 28, 1962
Guest stars: Peter Von Zerneck as Hotel Manager, Orson Bean as Arnold Platt, Barbara Barrie as Rosalind Faber, Karen Steele as Grace Harvey, Vaughn Taylor as J. Milton Turpin, Mae Questel as Annette Faber, Alexandra Berlin as 1st Roommate, Carolyn Groves as 2nd Roommate, Edward Lane as Bellboy, Ben Dova as Tailor, Sally Gracie as Brenda. A meek man confesses to embezzling money from his employer to pay for his mother's healthcare, and offers to pay it back—but everyone wants him to keep the money!
92	21	"Today the Man Who Kills the Ants is Coming"	Robert Gist	Howard Rodman, Kenneth M. Rosen	March 7, 1962
Guest stars: John Larch as John Clinton, Geraldine Fitzgerald as Lillian Clinton, Roger C. Carmel as Lowell Newton, Godfrey Cambridge as Detective Carlisle, Susie Fitzgerald as Kathy Clinton, Milt Kamen as Officer Novi, Jimmy Little as Sgt. Moroni, Jim Greene as Prisoner, Bill McNally as Johnny Clinton, Carmen Costi as Patrolman, Ed Crowley as Pharmacist, Alfred Hinckley as Officer Eckert. A patrolman suffering a nervous breakdown takes the precinct hostage.
93	22	"A Run for the Money"	David Lowell Rich	Howard Rodman	March 14, 1962
Guest stars: Eli Wallach as George Manin, Keenan Wynn as Bodram Bogota, Lois Nettleton as Sara Applinger, Jimmy Little as Desk Sergeant, Remo Pisani as Houseman, Lou Criscuolo as Picklebarrel, Jim Beard as Dice Player, Chris Bohn as Dutton, Chuck Bruce as Detective Ragaway, Pierre Epstein as Desk Clerk, Alex Freeman as Dice Player, Frank Marth as Man, Robert Weil as Henny. A hit man on the run from the police and the mob takes a gambler on a hot streak hostage in the hope the man will win enough money to finance his leaving the country.
94	23	"The One Marked Hot Gives Cold"	David Lowell Rich	Abram S. Ginnes	March 21, 1962
Guest stars: Robert Duvall as Francis Childe, Edward Andrews as William Childe, Peter Collins as Harry Padgett, Laurie Heineman as Aggie Padgett, Doris Rich as Mrs. Bell, Madeleine Sherwood as Mrs. Wilson, Jean Muir as Mrs. Lund, Marilyn Lovell as Ginny Padgett, Stuart Damon as Lt. Marks. A petty theft at an orphanage leads to a man with a troubled—and violent—past.
95	24	"Without Stick or Sword"	Paul Stanley	Lester Pine	March 28, 1962
Guest stars: William Shatner as Maung Tun, Martin Balsam as Captain Barris, Pilar Seurat as Gloria, Mary James as Mary Jeffers, Ted Beniades as First Mate. A sailor seeking revenge against the captain responsible for his brothers' deaths kills the man's wife by mistake. Short bar sequence filmed inside Sammy’s Bowery Follies, 267 Bowery.
96	25	"Lament for a Dead Indian"	Robert Gist	Joel Carpenter	April 11, 1962
Guest stars: Peter Falk as Frank O'Hearn, Neville Brand as Joe Brothers, Leonardo Cimino as Alberto Russo, Dino di Luca as Nick Russo, George Mathews as Jim Mulroy, Anita Dangler as Sheila O'Banyon, Louise Sorel as Girl #1, Judie Carroll as Girl #2, Nickolas Bianchi as Johnny. An American Indian, just released from prison, travels to New York to convince his army buddy to give up his criminal lifestyle
97	26	"The Sweetly Smiling Face of Truth"	James Sheldon	Gilbert Ralston	April 25, 1962
Guest stars: Nina Foch as Kitty Lamson, Lincoln Kilpatrick as Cappy Fleers, Patrick O'Neal as Roy Pressfield, Lonny Chapman as Asst. DA Smith, Shirl Conway as Emma Pressfield, Allan Frank as Kitty's Lawyer, Melville Ruick as Pressfield's Lawyer, Jacob Kalich as Danny Froken, Ruth Volner as Rosa. Did he fall or was he pushed? The death of a show biz agent casts a shadow on an egotistical actress, a philandering husband and the chauffeur who witnessed the incident.
98	27	"...And If Any Are Frozen, Warm Them..."	Robert Gist	Abram S. Ginnes	May 9, 1962
Guest stars: Akim Tamiroff as Demetru Lupescu, Nehemiah Persoff as Berco Romano, Lilia Skala as Valeria Lupescu, Ludwig Donath as Stefan, Louis Zorich as Sam, Al Lewis as Mr. Tanner, Bibi Osterwald as Bartender, Janet Fox as Witness, George McCoy as Police Officer. A Rumanian uses his wedding as a distraction to rob an old rival.
99	28	"Strike a Statue"	John Newland	Roland Wolpert, Howard Rodman	May 16, 1962
Guest stars: George C. Scott as Kermit Garrison, Paul Richards as Joseph Irona, Lois Smith as Dawn Garrison, Dean Stolber as Oliver Colfax, Dana Elcar as Varney, James Patterson as Carver, Carmen Filpi as Rioter. A sculptor refuses to stop working on a statue of his homeland's dictator, even when threats are made against his life. (Note: There is no opening narration in this episode.)
100	29	"The Multiplicity of Herbert Konish"	David Lowell Rich	Ernest Kinoy	May 23, 1962
Guest stars: Jean Stapleton as Marilyn Konish, David Wayne as Herbert Konish, Nancy Marchand as Esther Lindall, Wayne Maxwell as Peter, Francis Compton as Morris, Jane Hoffman as Mrs. Hagerson, William Le Massena as Hanley, Marsha Rivers as Sketcher, Frederick Rolf as Guitarist. The detectives are confounded when they discover a mild-mannered office worker is simultaneously leading four secret lives. Notable location: The original Pennsylvania Station (1910–1963)
101	30	"The King of Venus Will Take Care of You"	David Lowell Rich	Joel Carpenter	May 30, 1962
Guest stars: Jack Warden as Steve Lollo, Barbara Baxley as Kathy McDavoran, Michael McGreevey as Mickey McDavoran, John Mineo as Leader, Augie Rios as Boy, Ricky Sloane as Boy. A streetwise kid shelters a killer on the run from the police.
102	31	"The Rydecker Case"	John Brahm	Gene Roddenberry	June 6, 1962
Guest stars: Martin Gabel as Jerry Brayson, Kathryn Hays as Beth Rydecker, Michael Tolan as Asst. DA Ricardo Gardillo, Carol Eve Rossen as Nancy Hooper, Paul Stevens as Judge, Curtis Taylor as Paul Pireaux, Edward Lane as Charles Pinger, Ruth Ford as Mrs. Rydecker, Peter Turgeon as Kangdon. Detective Flint finds his motives and behavior questioned at the trial of a wealthy young woman he's arrested for drug use and reckless driving, .
103	32	"Memory of a Red Trolley Car"	Lawrence Doheny	Abram S. Ginnes	June 13, 1962
Guest stars: Gladys Cooper as Mrs. Johns, Joseph Campanella as Dr. Rutland, Barry Morse as Ernest Johns, Beatrice Straight as Ann Johns, Joseph Macauley as Professor Enright, Sid Raymond as Max, Peg Murray as Risa, Frank Schofield as Dr. Branson. A college professor, exposed to a dangerous chemical tries to separate truth from fantasy about his past. Notable Location: Freedomland U.S.A., a short lived amusement park located in the N.Y.C. borough The Bronx. Now the location of the Co-op City housing development.
104	33	"Goodbye Mama, Hello Auntie Maud"	Robert Gist	Sy Salkowitz	June 20, 1962
Guest stars: Salome Jens as Ellen Annis, Carroll O'Connor as Owen Oliver, Dorothy Blackburn as Mrs. Annis, James Coburn as Harry Brind, Irene Dailey as Aunt Maud, Sam Gray as Lt. Berson, House Jameson as Benford, Barbara Davis as Carrie, John J. Martin as Sgt. Devlon. A chauffeur kills the elderly woman he works for in order to marry her daughter—who is being blackmailed by the butler for supposedly committing the crime.

=== Season 4 (1962–1963) ===
The fourth season was the last for Naked City and started on September 19, 1962, with the episode "Hold for Gloria Christmas". A total of 34 episodes were produced for this last season, which ran from September 1962 through May 1963.

No. overall	No. in season	Title	Directed by	Written by	Original release date
105	1	"Hold for Gloria Christmas"	Walter Grauman	Joel Carpenter	September 19, 1962
Guest stars: Alan Alda as Poet in Bar, Burgess Meredith as Duncan Kleist, Jessica Walter as Woman in Bar, Herschel Bernardi as Stanley Dorkner, Eileen Heckart as Mildred Pepper, John Lasell as Sheldon, Barbara Dana as Beverly, Sanford Meisner as Kip Harris, Richard S. Castellano as Bartender, Lou Gilbert as Blind News Vendor, Candace Hilligoss as Mrs. Harris, Henderson Forsythe as Dr. Hennickson. The investigation into the murder of a Greenwich Village Beat poet reveals a life of tragic self-destruction. (Note: The Marvel Comics issues Amazing Fantasy #15 and Journey Into Mystery #83, which feature the first appearances of Spider-Man and Thor respectively, are displayed prominently in scenes taking place at a newsstand, technically making this episode the first on-screen appearances of the characters; these issues were actually on sale when the episode was filmed sometime in the late spring or early summer of 1962.)
106	2	"Idylls of a Running Back"	John Peyser	Ernest Kinoy	September 26, 1962
Guest stars: Aldo Ray as Elvin Rhodes, William Daniels as Harry Culverin, Coley Wallace as Pixie Gates, Sandy Dennis as Eleanor Hubber, Joe Silver as Assistant D.A. Ketton, Nancy Wickwire as Norma Rhodes, Philip Sterling as Officer Schulberg, Bob Romann as Tony Cavalejo. An obsessed fan shoots the pro football star she's in love with.
107	3	"Daughter, Am I in My Father's House?"	David Lowell Rich	Shimon Wincelberg	October 3, 1962
Guest stars: Dan Duryea as Clyde Royd, Barbara Harris as Helga Royd, Marco St. John as Dom Capano, Frank Campanella as Capano, Harold Gaetano as Police Officer, Jimmy Little as Desk Sergeant, Naura Hayden as Actress on Screen, Charles Dierkop as Youth on Street. A rage-filled father tries to "protect" his daughter by attacking young men he believes are threatening her. (Note: There is no opening narration to this episode.)
108	4	"And By the Sweat of Thy Brow..."	Irvin Kershner	Abram S. Ginnes	October 10, 1962
Guest stars: Richard Jordan as Jonah, Barbara Barrie as Sarah Hinson, Martin Sheen as Nick, Florence Anglin as Mrs. Forrest, Michael Gorrin as Himmel, David Clarke as Attacker. A disfigured man saves a woman from an attacker—but fears to show his face to the world.
109	5	"Kill Me While I'm Young So I Can Die Happy"	Denis Sanders	Abram S. Ginnes	October 17, 1962
Guest stars: Maureen Stapleton as Ruth Cullan, Rosetta Bain as Mrs. Arcaro, Joseph Beruh as Joe Arcaro, Franklin Cover as Jergens, Karl Held as Assistant District Attorney, House Jameson as Judge, Jan Miner as Superintendent, Tom Geraghty as Winters. The detectives try to help a troubled woman after her suicide attempt.
110	6	"Five Cranks for Winter... Ten Cranks for Spring"	Paul Stanley	Stirling Silliphant	October 24, 1962
Guest stars: Robert Duvall as Johnny Meigs, Herschel Bernardi as Gus Slate, Shirley Knight as Kathy Meigs, Ludwig Donath as Doc Benton, Hy Anzell as Muzzo, Stefan Gierasch as Weller, Maxwell Glanville as Lars, Pete Gumeny as Handler, Sid Raymond as Bartender, Richard Roat as Dr. Lee Harper, Robert Weil as Prisoner, Remo Pisani as Bookie, Charles Dierkop as Suspect. A gambler takes advantage of a boxer desperate for money to help his wife achieve her dream. Remake of season one episode 38, "The Canvas Bullet". (Note: there is no opening narration to this episode.)
111	7	"Go Fight City Hall"	David Lowell Rich	Ben Maddow	October 31, 1962
Guest stars: Joseph Buloff as Waiter, George Rose as George Lanyard McGrath, Sally Gracie as Leona McGrath, Arnold Soboloff as Giacovetti, Carmine Caridi as Assistant Driver. A "common man" drunkard with a grudge against Flint starts a mini-crime wave as a practical joke on the detective, then takes a "scientist" hostage only to encounter a man as common as himself.
112	8	"Torment Him Much and Hold Him Long"	Robert Gist	Stirling Silliphant	November 7, 1962
Guest stars: Robert Duvall as Barney Sonners, Sandy Baron as Charlie Briggs, Barbara Loden as Penny Sonners, Alfred Ryder as Link Toland, Jesse White as Harold Slate, Murray Matheson as Harold Lowenson, Eddie Hyans as Cab Criver, Donnie Melvin as Keith Sonners. An informant finds his life and family threatened when his information prevents a robbery.
113	9	"Make It Fifty Dollars and Add Love to Nona"	George Sherman	Shimon Wincelberg	November 14, 1962
Guest stars: Luther Adler as Kovar, Roxanne Arlen as Nona Kovar, Ed Begley as Jimmy Fenton, William Lanteau as Chiles, Alex Cord as Nick Kovar, Grania O'Malley as Mrs. Kitchwell. When a son places his father in a retirement home against the man's wishes, he vents his rage by phoning bomb threats to abusive people he's read about in the papers.
114	10	"A Horse Has a Big Head – Let Him Worry!"	Denis Sanders	Abram S. Ginnes	November 21, 1962
Guest stars: Sorrell Booke as Leventhal, Diahann Carroll as Ruby Jay, Audra Lindley as Mrs. Denton, John Megna as Harold Denton, Graham Jarvis as Denton, Lou Gilbert as Green, Luke Halpin as Kid, Ava Marie Megna as Helen, Tommy Norden as Blind Boy. A vision-impaired, near-blind child flees his school outing and wanders the streets to prove his independence.
115	11	"Dust Devil on a Quiet Street"	George Sherman	Howard Rodman	November 28, 1962
Guest stars: Richard Basehart as Lester Bergson, Robert Walker Jr. as Neil McCaw, Barbara Barrie as Marcia Komack, Peter Helm as Ken Elson, Martin Sheen as Counterman, Ed Preble as 1st Businessman, John C. Becher as 2nd Businessman, Ken Kercheval as Acting Student. Is an acting student performing when he portrays a psychotic menace—or is he revealing his true self?
116	12	"The Virtues of Madame Douvay"	Robert Gist	Paula Fox	December 5, 1962
Guest stars: Denise Darcel as Madeline Douvay, Chana Eden as Angelique, Nico Minardos as Moktir, Claude Dauphin as Roger Douvay, Francois Flamano as Marius, Robert Dryden as Police Surgeon, Michael Enserro as Vegetable Vendor, Harold Gary as Superintendent, George S. Irving as Butcher. The murder of their chef doesn't stop the couple owning the restaurant from their bickering—or flirting with others.
117	13	"King Stanislaus and the Knights of the Round Stable"	James Sheldon	Abram S. Ginnes	December 12, 1962
Guest stars: Jack Klugman as Pete Kannick, John Larch as Steve Werminski, Joanna Merlin as Gloria Werminski, Rosetta Bain as Mrs. Arcaro, Sybil Bowan as Mrs. Comely, Michael Gorrin as Father Thaddeus. Two old friends express their friendship by brawling and drinking, at increasing danger to their lives.
118	14	"Spectre of the Rose Street Gang"	James Sheldon	Alvin Sargent, Jerry Gruskin	December 19, 1962
Guest stars: Jack Warden as Sam Langan, Carroll O'Connor as Tony Corran, Roger C. Carmel as Al Gurdine, Joseph Sullivan as Arthur Flake, Bethel Leslie as Amy Langan, Patricia Wheel as Eleanor Corran, Otto Lohmann as Jelly Yates, Ludmila Toretzka as Mrs. Doxoras. The discovery of a body buried 25 years earlier reunites the friends responsible for his death—and threatens to expose their guilt.
119	15	"Don't Knock It Till You've Tried It"	Alex March	Joel Carpenter	December 26, 1962
Guest stars: Walter Matthau as Dr. Max Lewine, Sally Gracie as Bixie, Joan Copeland as Beverly Lewine, Patricia Englund as Meredith, Dorothy Sands as Mother, Cynthia Belgrave as Cleaning Lady, Lou Criscuolo as Tyrone. A married man's fling with a Las Vegas showgirl takes a bizarre turn when she follows him back to New York—and takes him prisoner at gunpoint.
120	16	"Her Life in Moving Pictures"	George Sherman	Howard Rodman, Sidney Boehm	January 2, 1963
Guest stars: Bradford Dillman as Roger Fallon, Eileen Heckart as Virginia Cort, Frances Heflin as Josephine Hendon, House Jameson as Whitworth, Richard Nichols as Butler, Irene Windust as Mrs. Whitworth. A manipulative thief seduces a lonely maid in order to rob the wealthy family she works for.
121	17	"Robin Hood and Clarence Darrow, They Went Out with Bow and Arrow"	Stuart Rosenberg	Abram S. Ginnes	January 9, 1963
Guest stars: Eddie Albert as Earl Johannis, Harry Davis as Harry Abraham, Christopher Walken as Chris Johannis, Paul O'Keefe as Jack Johannis, Theo Goetz as Old Man, Arlene Golonka as Carol, Henry Lascoe as McNeil, Michael Strong as Henry, Michael Baseleon as Blair, Alix Elias as Carhop, Ellen Madison as Gaby, Sylvia Miles as 1st Woman, Michael Parks as Tank. A liquor store owner risks his life to set a trap for the thieves who have been robbing other stores in the neighborhood and killing their owners.
122	18	"The Apple Falls Not Far from the Tree"	William Graham	Arnold Perl, Lester Pine	January 23, 1963
Guest stars: Keir Dullea as Les Gerard, Roy Poole as Wells, Alexander Scourby as Walter Gerard, Mart Hulswit as Ron, Louise Platt as Eileen Gerard, Ralph Williams as Buddy, Gar Smith as 1st Doorman, Robert Fitzsimmons as 2nd Doorman, John D. Seymour as Ansted, Claudia Morgan as Mrs. Ansted, Carmine Caridi as Elevator Operator. An overprivileged young man and his buddies rob his parents' wealthy friends for kicks. (Note: there is no opening narration to this episode.)
123	19	"Beyond This Place There Be Dragons"	George Sherman	Shimon Wincelberg	January 30, 1963
Guest stars: Frank Gorshin as Alan Starkie, Hilda Brawner as Polly, Val Avery as Franco, Sorrell Booke as Fentus, Richard Shepard as Soldier, Charles Tyner as Veyo, Louis Zorich as Manos, Jimmy Little as Desk Sergeant, Barry Newman as Cab Driver. An informant desperately tries to raise enough money to leave the city when he discovers gangsters are going to murder him.
124	20	"A Man Without a Skin"	George Sherman	Abram S. Ginnes	February 6, 1963
Guest stars: George Segal as Jerry Costell, Gabriel Dell as Willie Corbin, Dana Elcar as Al Boris, Paul Larson as Hank Mulvaney, Carolyn Groves as Diane, Barbara Hayes as Carlotta Corbin, Jimmy Little as Sgt. Higgins, John Dorman as Charlie, James Pritchett as Policeman. A detective addicted to taking dangerous chances puts the lives of the other detectives at risk
125	21	"Prime of Life"	Walter Grauman	Stirling Silliphant	February 13, 1963
Guest stars: Barnard Hughes as Older Reporter, Gene Hackman as Jasper, Dort Clark as Tom Hanson, Richard Hamilton as Phillip Hames, Russell Hardie as Chief Guard, George L. Smith as Lt. Otel, Jack Stamberger as Father Donovan, Howard Wierum as Judge, Chris Gampel as Warden Darrell, Charles Dierkop as Symphony Audience Member. Flint is unnerved when he is called upon to witness the execution of the violent criminal he arrested.
126	22	"Bringing Far Places Together"	Irvin Kershner	Howard Rodman	February 20, 1963
Guest stars: Alejandro Rey as Jaime Socorro, Victor Janquera as Patillas, Albert Henderson as Patrolman, Coco Ramirez as Isabel Socorro, Zvee Scooler as Aaron, John S. Ragin as Warstein, Lawrence Fletcher as Deputy Commissioner Belding. An immigrant desperate for work gives his last $50 to a con artist who promises to find him a job.
127	23	"The Highest of Prizes"	James Sheldon	Arnold Perl	February 27, 1963
Guest stars: Jean Stapleton as Mrs. Trellis, Robert Culp as Richard Calder, Joanne Linville as Eunice Vail, Akim Tamiroff as Emil Pappas, Gerald S. O'Loughlin as Hackett, M'el Dowd as Laura Haynes, Joan Potter as Myra Calder. The lone holdout in a murder trial tries to convince his fellow jurors the prosecution lacks evidence "beyond a reasonable doubt" to convict the defendant.
128	24	"Alive and Still a Second Lieutenant"	Ralph Senensky	Shimon Wincelberg	March 6, 1963
Guest stars: Robert Sterling as Jason Colwell, Jon Voight as Victor Binks, Hilda Brawner as Paula Doremus, House Jameson as Terwilliger, Luis Van Rooten as Binks, Joseph Leon as Moegli, Allan Rich as Cab Driver. A frustrated low-level executive accidentally kills a man in a fight over a parking space.
129	25	"Stop the Parade, a Baby is Crying!"	William Graham	Abram S. Ginnes	March 20, 1963
Guest stars: James Patterson as Phil North, Jack Klugman as Arthur Crews, Diana Hyland as Vivian North, Alex Cord as Dick Wilks, Lily Lodge as Olga, Leigh Wharton as Earl. When a woman reports her car stolen Flint is suspicious of her increasingly erratic behavior.
130	26	"On the Battlefront, Every Minute Is Important"	Robert Ellis Miller	Howard Rodman	March 27, 1963
Guest stars: Kurt Kasznar as Corsica, David Janssen as Carl Ashland, Leonardo Cimino as Sid Kitka, John Dutra as Phillip Seaver, Lloyd Hubbard as Jelgava, James Dukas as Truck Driver, Sid Raymond as Elevator Operator. Flint's investigation into a bungled robbery takes him into the advertising world—and to a surprising job offer.
131	27	"Howard Running Bear is a Turtle"	Harry Harris	Alvin Sargent	April 3, 1963
Guest stars: Perry Lopez as Howard Running Bear, Piper Laurie as Marie Highmark, Juano Hernandez as Oscar Loon, Paul Richards as Joseph Highmark, Cicely Tyson as Darlene Knox, William Le Massena as Thomanini, Chet London as George Masters, Anita Dangler as Maidie Craven, Pete Gumeny as Castigan, Doris Rich as Mrs. Highmark, Mickey Freeman as Bartender. Flint's investigation into the death of a high-rise construction worker is stymied by the code of silence of the dead man's native American co-workers.
132	28	"No Naked Ladies in Front of Giovanni's House!"	Ralph Senensky	Abram S. Ginnes	April 17, 1963
Guest stars: Harry Guardino as Ben Giovanni, Marisa Pavan as Francesca, Al Lewis as Mr. Carrari, Augusta Merighi as Celia, Jonathan Lippe as Brain Trust, Gerry Matthews as Brain Trust, Joe Silver as Dean of Admissions, Fay Bernard as Mrs. Carrari, Tom Brannum as Brain Trust, Tom Slater as Brain Trust. An insecure man struggles to escape from the shadow of his domineering late father who robbed him of his self-confidence.
133	29	"Carrier"	James Sheldon	Ernest Kinoy	April 24, 1963
Guest stars: Sandy Dennis as Lorraine Kirshwood, Donnie Melvin as Joey Dunnahan, Bruce Gordon as Dr. Sorensteen, Anthony Zerbe as Phil Karshow, Sam Gray as Sol Chaplin, Estelle Evans as Crossing Guard, John Horn as Freddy Eauchant, Bibi Osterwald as Grace, Peter Morelli as Alan. The police race to find a woman carrying a rare disease.
134	30	"Color Schemes Like Never Before"	Ralph Senensky	Alvin Sargent	May 1, 1963
Guest stars: Lou Antonio as Charlie Tepperoni, Carol Eve Rossen as Gladys Hopper, Johnny Seven as Carmine Tepperoni, Neva Patterson as Miss Morley, Eugene Roche as George, Remo Pisani as Nicholas, David Hooks as Arnold, Ron Weyland as Lester. When a young man unable to put down roots witnesses an accidental killing resulting from his brother's criminal activities, the other members of the brother's gang fear he will inform on them.
135	31	"The S.S. American Dream"	Allen H. Miner	Frank R. Pierson	May 8, 1963
Guest stars: John Larch as George Paraskis, Madeleine Sherwood as Grace Paraskis, Percy Rodriguez as Millard Jeffers, Roger C. Carmel as Quist, Edward Whaley as Robby Jeffers, Charles Tyner as Jerome "Apples" Seidner, Michael Dana as Roark, Gretchen Wyler as Ruth, Charles Gilfeather as Officer Jarman, Joe Santos as Man on Street. In a fit of rage, a junkman hoping to salvage a valuable cargo ship kills his business partner after the man refuses to help him achieve his dream.
136	32	"One, Two, Three, Rita Rakahowski"	Robert Ellis Miller	Joel Carpenter	May 15, 1963
Guest stars: Carol Eve Rossen as Rita Rakahowski, Nehemiah Persoff as Griffin, Anthony Franciosa as Gorilla, Alice Ghostley as Clara, Richard Ward as Nova Scotia, Lou Criscuolo as Tomasola, Marilyn Lovell as Miss Tilton, Howard Mann as Officer Durkin. The rivalry between the head of a box company and a popular worker for a woman's affections spirals out of control.
137	33	"Golden Lads and Girls"	William Graham	Ernest Kinoy	May 22, 1963
Guest stars: Elizabeth Allen as Laura Lanning, Norma Connolly as Pearl Wystemski, Mike Kellin as Louis Wystemski, Murray Matheson as Martin Hilliard, Tom Bosley as Judge, Robert Webber as Gordon Lanning, Anna Berger as Miss Delahanty, Sam Greene as Fire Lieutenant, Lincoln Kilpatrick as Bailiff, Fred J. Scollay as Dr. Winford, Harold Gary as Gatilla, Irene Kane as Miss Hilton, Patti Keefer as Sally Lanning, Jessica Walter as Upstairs Maid. A high-powered TV executive who refuses to acknowledge his drinking problem finds himself in court after striking his wife and crosses paths with a blue-collar worker fighting the same demons.
138	34	"Barefoot on a Bed of Coals"	James Sheldon	Shimon Wincelberg	May 29, 1963
Guest stars: Elizabeth Allen as Ola Martin, Dustin Hoffman as Finney, Steven Hill as Stanley Walenty, Zohra Lampert as Clara Espuella, Henry Lascoe as Quale, Mitchell Ryan as Paul Tamarind, Mickey Freeman as Costumer, John C. Becher as Reporter, Mel Stuart as Man on Street, Ramon Bieri as Patrolman. An unstable man desperate to give his life meaning poses as a police officer

== Syndication ==
During the late 1980s, Naked City aired weekly early Monday mornings on New York City's WNYW-TV, Channel 5. In July 2011, Retro Television Network began airing episodes of both The Naked City and Naked City. In October 2011, MeTV began carrying Naked City, airing it weekly overnight, and in mid-2013, it began showing two episodes of The Naked City back-to-back. As of October 2023, Naked City can be seen on Retro Television Network.

== Home media ==
Between 2003 and 2006, Image Entertainment, under license from Sony Pictures Home Entertainment, released a series of single-disc releases containing four of the hourlong episodes per disc, followed by three releases billed as "Box Set" 1 to 3, each of which contained three discs and 12 one-hour episodes, with their original commercials and sponsors' slots included as bonus features. These releases are now out of print. Early 2013 saw the release of a 10-disc Best of Naked City set containing 40 episodes, all of which had been included on the earlier DVDs, and Naked City: 20 Star-Filled Episodes, a five-disc set with 10 more re-releases and 10 previously unreleased shows. It includes two half-hour episodes, the earlier series' first appearance on DVD. None of these releases attempts to present the show in chronological order; their contents appear to have been selected for the episodes' famous guest stars, whose names are prominently featured on their covers and other packaging.

On November 5, 2013, Image Entertainment released Naked City: The Complete Series on DVD in Region 1. The 29-disc set contains all 138 episodes of the series.

== Awards ==
Naked City also received Emmy nominations for Best Dramatic Series—Less Than One Hour in 1959; Outstanding Program Achievement in the Field of Drama in 1961, 1962 and 1963; Paul Burke for Outstanding Continuing Performance by an Actor in a Series in 1962 and 1963; Horace McMahon for Outstanding Performance in a Supporting Role by an Actor in 1962; Arthur Hiller for Outstanding Directorial Achievement in Drama; Nancy Malone for Outstanding Performance in a Supporting Role by an Actress in 1963; and Diahann Carroll for Outstanding Single Performance by an Actress in 1963.

== In popular culture ==
- The title Naked City is used for the L.A. Noire DLC vice case titled "The Naked City".
- The series is parodied in an episode of Top Cat titled "Naked Town".

== Tie-in book ==
A tie-in collection of short stories was written to capitalize on the success of the TV series. It was titled The Naked City, and was published as a mass-market paperback by Dell in 1959. Although it was credited on the book's cover solely to series creator Stirling Silliphant, it actually consisted of writer and newspaperman Charles Einstein's prose adaptations of eight Silliphant stories from the series' first season of half-hour episodes. Einstein is the half-brother of comedian Albert Brooks. The cover featured an evocative photo montage by photographer David Attie. The book is well regarded by fans of the series, but it has long been out of print.
