= Ernst Décsey =

Austrian author and music critic

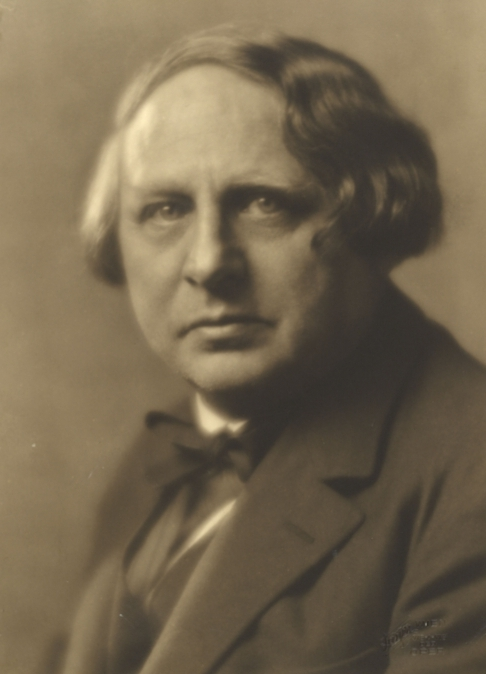
Ernst Décsey Portrait

Ernst Décsey (13 April 1870 – 12 March 1941), was an Austrian author and music critic.

== Biography ==
Décsey was born in Hamburg and studied law at the Vienna University. At the same time he completed professional training at the Vienna music school (Konservatorium) in piano, harmony and composition.

From 1899 on Ernst Décsey worked as music critic at the Grazer Tagespost (Graz's daily newspaper) and subsequently became its chief editor. In 1920, he was offered the position of permanent music adviser at the Neues Wiener Tagblatt (a daily newspaper) in Vienna, where he became a leading music critic of his time.

In addition to his journalistic work, Ernst Décsey also taught music history and esthetics at the Vienna music school and published a number of novels, short stories, plays, libretti and biographies. He co-authored (with Gustav Holm) a play Sissys Brautfahrt ("Sissy's bridal journey") which was later used for the libretto of the well-known operetta Sissy by Ernst and Hubert Marischka; and wrote the libretto for Erich Wolfgang Korngold's opera Die Kathrin.

His biographies of great musicians in particular earned him wide reputation throughout the music world, far beyond Austria's borders. They included Hugo Wolf – Das Leben und das Lied (Hugo Wolf – life and lied); Bruckner – Versuch eines Lebens (Bruckner – a tentative outline of his life); Claude Debussy; Debussys Werke (Debussy's works – published after his death); Johann Strauß; Franz Lehár; and Maria Jeritza.

Décsey died 12 March 1941 in Vienna.

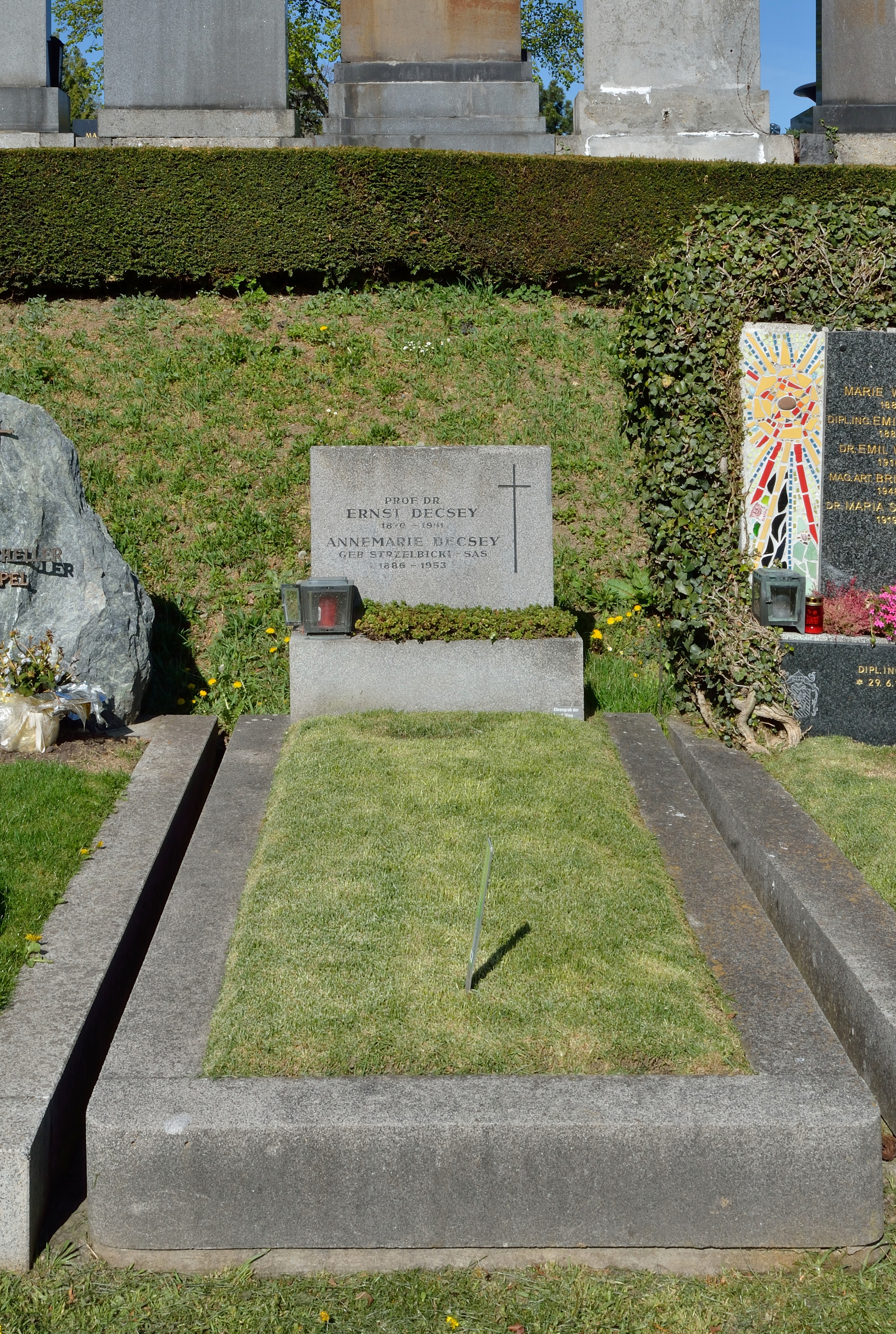
Décsey's grave

== Works ==
Novels and Stories

- Du liebes Wien, Roman, 1911;
- Zigarettenrauch, Erzählungen, 1911;
- Die Insel der sieben Träume, Ein Reisebuch, 1912;
- Der kleine Herzog Cupidon, Roman, 1913;
- Die Theaterfritzl, Roman, 1915;
- Krieg im Stein, Erzählungen, 1915;
- Im Feuerkreis des Karsts, Erzählungen, 1916;
- Memoiren eines Pechvogels, Erzählungen, 1917;
- Die Stadt am Strom, Roman, 1918?;
- Das Theater unserer lieben Frau, Roman, 1927;
- Die Spieldose, Musikeranekdoten, 1928;

Biographies

- Hugo Wolf - Das Leben und das Lied, 1906;
- Peter Rosegger, 1913?;
- Bruckner - Versuch eines Lebens, 1920;
- Johann Strauß, 1922;
- Franz Lehár, 1924;
- Maria Jeritza, 1931;
- Claude Debussy, 1936;
- Debussys Werke (Nachlass), 1948;

Plays and Librettos

- Der Musikant Gottes (Co-Author: Victor Léon), Theaterstück, 1924;
- Sissys Brautfahrt (Co-Author: Gustav Holm), Lustspiel, 1931 (1932 adapted into Fritz Kreisler's operetta Sissy, 1936 film The King Steps Out by Josef von Sternberg);
- Die Kathrin, Libretto zur gleichnamigen Oper von Erich Wolfgang Korngold, 1937;
- Die Dame im Traum, (Co-Author: Gustav Holm), Libretto zur gleichnamigen Oper von Franz Salmhofer, 1935.
