= The King Steps Out =

1936 film by Josef von Sternberg

- Directed by: Josef von Sternberg
- Written by: Sidney Buchman
- Produced by: William Perlberg; Wilhelm Thiele
- Starring: Grace Moore; Franchot Tone; Walter Connolly
- Cinematography: Lucien Ballard
- Edited by: Viola Lawrence
- Music by: Howard Jackson
- Production company: Columbia Pictures
- Distributed by: Columbia Pictures
- Release date: May 28, 1936
- Running time: 85 minutes
- Country: United States
- Language: English

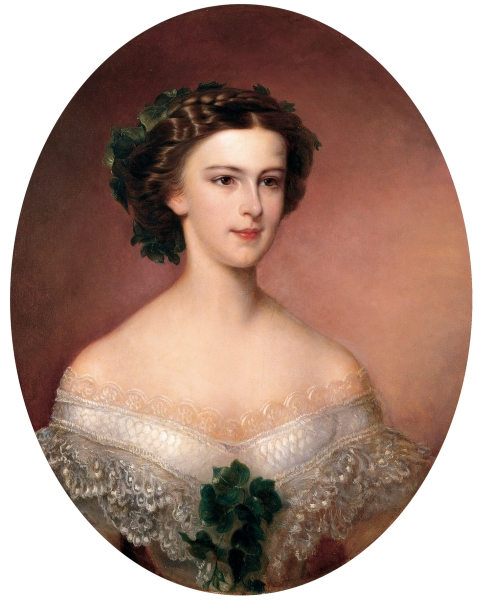
The film is based around Elisabeth's young years 1852–1854 (portrait of the young empress shortly after her wedding, by Amanda Bergstedt)

The King Steps Out is a 1936 American musical comedy film directed by Josef von Sternberg and starring Grace Moore, Franchot Tone and Walter Connolly. It is based on the early years of Empress Elisabeth of Austria, known as "Sisi" or "Sissi", and her courtship and marriage to Franz Joseph I of Austria, after he was initially engaged to her older sister Duchess Helene in Bavaria. The film is set from 1852 to 1854.

The script was written by Sidney Buchman, based on a theatre play called Sissys Brautfahrt by Ernst Décsey and Robert Weil aka Gustav Holm. Columbia Pictures bought the rights from Ernst Marischka in order to make the film. The lyrics for the music were by Dorothy Fields and the music by Viennese composer and violinist Fritz Kreisler. Cinematography was by Lucien Ballard and the editing by Viola Lawrence. Costume design was by the Austrian Ernst Deutsch-Dryden.

Future Broadway dancer Gwen Verdon made her movie debut doing a ballet solo at age 11, but was uncredited.

The film had only minimal influence on the later Sissi trilogy from the 1950s by Ernst Marischka starring Romy Schneider and Karlheinz Böhm.

== Cast ==
- Grace Moore as Princess Elizabeth
- Franchot Tone as Emperor Franz Josef
- Walter Connolly as Duke of Bavaria
- Raymond Walburn as Colonel von Kempen
- Elisabeth Risdon as Archduchess Sophie
- Nana Bryant as Princess Louise
- Victor Jory as Captain Palffy
- Frieda Inescort as Princess Helena
- Thurston Hall as Major
- Herman Bing as Pretzelberger
- George Hassell as Herlicka
- Johnny Arthur as Chief of the Secret Police
- Charles Coleman as Lieutenant (uncredited)
- William Hopper as Soldier (uncredited)
- Henry Roquemore as Waiter (uncredited)
- C. Montague Shaw as Russian Delegate (uncredited)
- Al Shean as Ballet Master (uncredited)
- Gwen Verdon as Specialty Ballerina (uncredited)

== Reception ==
Writing for The Spectator in 1936, Graham Greene gave the film a mildly positive review, noting that in its "light and amusing sequences" it bore the hallmarks of "the Lubitsch touch". Greene praised the acting of Bing, claiming that "the whole film [is carried] on his wildly expressive shoulders".
