= Mickey Freeman =

American actor and comedian

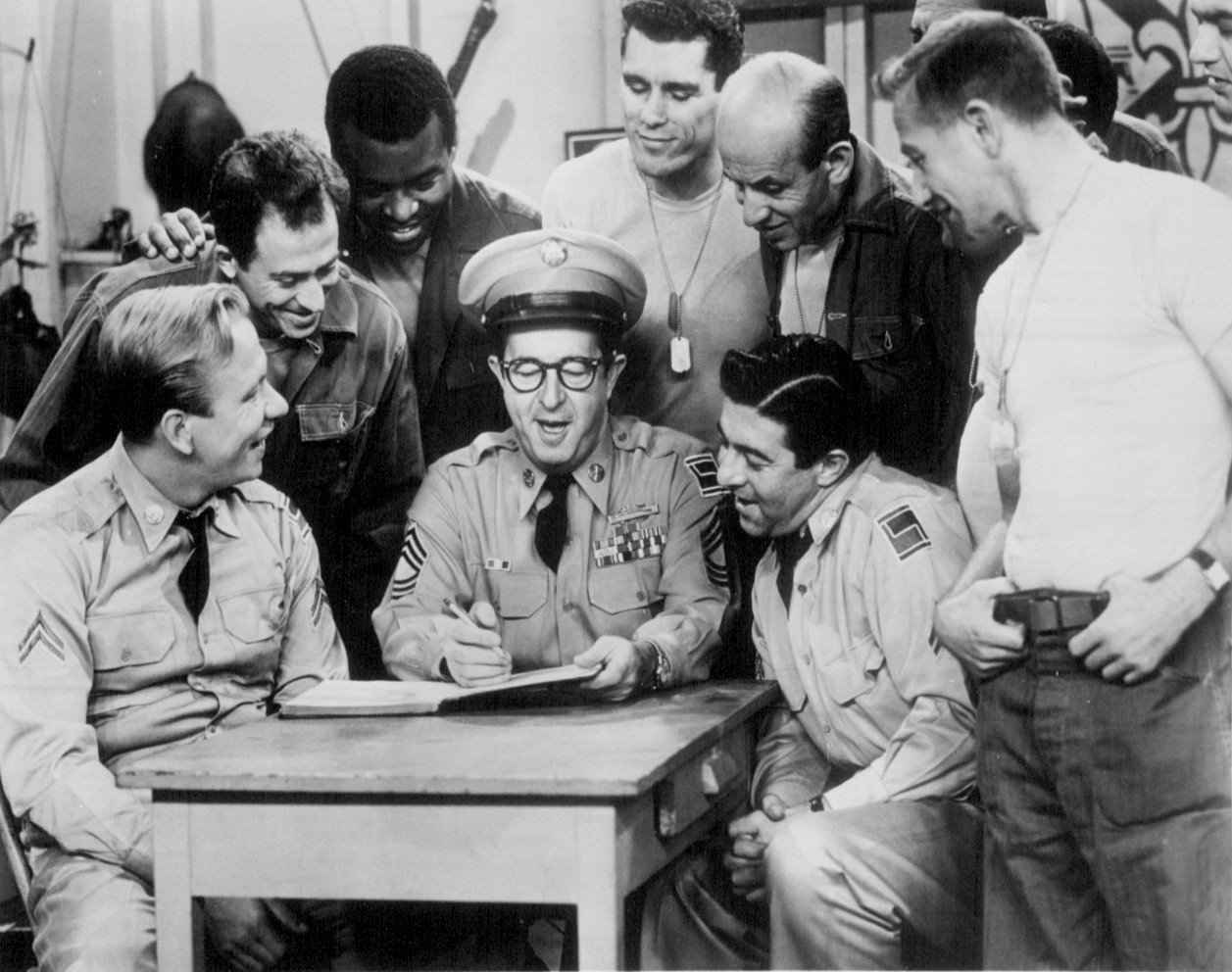
- Freeman (right) with The Phil Silvers Show cast, 1957
- Born: Irving "Mickey" Freeman; February 12, 1917; New York, U.S.
- Died: September 21, 2010 (aged 93); New York, U.S.
- Occupation(s): Actor, comedian

Irving "Mickey" Freeman (February 12, 1917 – September 21, 2010) was an American actor and comedian. He was best known for playing Private Fielding Zimmerman in the American sitcom television series The Phil Silvers Show.

== Career ==
Freeman guest-starred in television programs, including Naked City, The Equalizer and The Lloyd Bridges Show. He also made two appearances on The Ed Sullivan Show and worked as a cruise ship comedian.

He had been a member of the New York Friars Club since January 1987.

Freeman died in September 2010 at New York City, New York, at the age of 93.

== Filmography ==
Mickey Freeman film and television credits
Year	Title	Role	Notes
1954	Inner Sanctum	Photographer	1 episode
1954	Goodyear Television Playhouse		1 episode
1955	The New Recruits	Pvt. Fielding Zimmerman	TV movie pilot
1955-1959	The Phil Silvers Show	Pvt. Fielding Zimmerman	133 episodes
1959	The Phil Silvers Pontiac Special: Keep in Step	Pvt. Fielding Zimmerman	TV special
1955-1956	The Ed Sullivan Show	Pvt. Fielding Zimmerman/Himself	2 episodes
1960	Deadline	Robertson	1 episode
1960	Celebrity Talent Scouts	Himself	1 episode
1961-1963	Naked City	Ervin Wolinsky/Bartender/Costumer	3 episodes
1963	The Lloyd Bridges Show	Maginot Stillman	1 episode
1967	Pat Boone in Hollywood	Himself	1 episode
1973	Shamus	Pimp	Film
1982	Born Beautiful	Newspaper Dealer	TV movie
1986	The Equalizer	Comedian	Episode: "Counterfire"
1998	Karaoke Knight	Retired Sailor	Short film. Showtime
