= Fred J. Scollay =

American actor (1923–2015)

- Born: Frederick J. Scollay; March 19, 1923; Roxbury, Massachusetts, U.S.
- Died: November 3, 2015 (aged 92); Hobe Sound, Florida, U.S.
- Occupation: Actor
- Spouse: Ann Barr

Fred J. Scollay (March 19, 1923 – November 3, 2015) was an American character actor with dozens of credits in daytime and primetime television, as well as film and stage work

== Early years and military service ==
Scollay was born in Roxbury, Massachusetts, and was "one of four orphaned Scollays." After being in "many a foster home" he was raised by Mr. and Mrs. James Murphy of Boston, Massachusetts. He studied acting at Emerson College and at Bishop-Lee Dramatic School.

Scollay was in the United States Navy during World War II, serving as an aviator machinist mate. Because of the siblings' orphaned status, they were not reunited for about 30 years until his baby sister initiated an investigation in 1962. They discovered that she and he grew up within 10 minutes of each other and that she was the hat-check girl at the nightclub where Scollay and his wife celebrated their wedding.

== Television, film and stage ==
On daytime TV, Scollay was an original cast member of The Doctors, playing hospital chaplain Rev. Sam Shafer (1963–1964). From 1970 to 1971, he appeared on Somerset (TV series) as Harry Wilson (aka Ike Harding). On Another World (1977–1980), he played Charley Hobson, the last husband of Ada Lucas Davis (Constance Ford). He also had roles on Young Doctor Malone, The Edge of Night (two roles), Search for Tomorrow, Love Is a Many Splendored Thing and The Guiding Light.

In primetime, Scollay had roles dating back to the earliest days of television. He made numerous appearances in such programs as Studio One, Kraft Television Theatre, Armstrong Circle Theatre, Naked City, The Defenders, Dr. Kildare, and Gunsmoke, among many others. His last part was a recurring role as a judge on several episodes of Law & Order (1991–1996). He also appeared in television commercials and public service advertising.

Scollay's work in motion pictures included A View from the Bridge, Odds Against Tomorrow, and Stage Struck.

Scollay's Broadway credits include The Devil's Advocate.

== Personal life and death ==
Scollay married his childhood sweetheart, Ann, in 1944. He died on November 3, 2015, in Hobe Sound, Florida. His wife, Ann, predeceased him.

== Filmography ==
Year	Title	Role	Notes
1958	Stage Struck	Bum	Uncredited
1959	Odds Against Tomorrow	Cannoy	Uncredited
1962	A View from the Bridge		
1969	The Tree	Alex	
1971	Lady Liberty	Doctor	Uncredited
1974	Death Wish	District Attorney Peters	
1975	The Man Who Would Not Die	Lieutenant Willetts	
1977	The Private Files of J. Edgar Hoover	Putnam	
1978	Breaking Up	Tony	
1980	I, Paul	St. Paul	
1982	Q	Captain Fletcher	
1990	Stanley & Iris	Mr. Delancey	
