= Robert Weil (writer) =

Austrian writer (1881–1960)

Robert Weil (1881–1960) was an Austrian writer for stage and screen.

Under the pseudonym Gustav Holm, he co-authored (with Ernst Décsey) a play Sissys Brautfahrt ("Sissy's bridal journey") which was later used for the libretto of the well-known operetta Sissy by Ernst and Hubert Marischka.

He also used the pseudonym "Homunkulus".

== Selected filmography ==
- I Do Not Want to Know Who You Are (1932)
- Three on a Honeymoon (1932)
- Honeymoon Trip (1933)
- Adventure on the Southern Express (1934)
- Spring Parade (1934)
- Abschiedswalzer (1934)
- Ihr größter Erfolg (1934)
- Winter Night's Dream (1935)
- Stradivari (1935)
- Ich liebe alle Frauen (1935)
- Forget Me Not (1935)
- Konfetti (1936)
- The King Steps Out (1936)
- The Charm of La Boheme (1937)
- Immer wenn ich glücklich bin (1938)
- Die unruhigen Mädchen (1938)
- Addio Mimí! (1949)
- Die Deutschmeister (1955)
