= Janet Fox =

American actress

- Born: June 12, 1912; Chicago, Illinois, U.S.
- Died: April 22, 2002 (aged 89); Palm Beach, Florida, U.S.
- Occupation: Actress

Janet Fox (June 12, 1912 – April 22, 2002) was an American actress.

== Life and career ==
Born in Chicago, Illinois, Fox was the niece of American novelist and playwright Edna Ferber. She studied at the American Academy of Dramatic Art after leaving finishing school, and began her career with the Westport Country Players.

Fox's first role was in 1932, playing the lead in June Moon, a play by Ring Lardner and George Kaufman. Fox was known as a "popular character actress" and also performed in radio plays. Her first romantic lead was playing in the radio broadcast, Manhattan At Midnight in 1940. Fox may have been best known in the role of Bernice Niemeyer in the original Broadway production of Stage Door, and as Tina in the original Broadway production of Dinner at Eight.

She died in Palm Beach, Florida, on April 22, 2002, from natural causes, aged 89.

== Filmography ==
Year	Title	Role	Notes
1940	They Knew What They Wanted	Mildred	
1963	Act One	Edna Ferber	Uncredited, (final film role)

== Television ==
Janet Fox played the role of a librarian in an episode of The Phil Silvers Show.

The Phil Silvers Show (Sgt Bilko) S2E31 Bilko Acres (07 May 1957) available on YouTube.
