= William Cottrell =

American theoretical physicist and quantitative researcher

William "Billy" Cottrell
- Born: 1980 (age 45–46); Concord, North Carolina, United States
- Education: University of Chicago (B.A.); University of Wisconsin–Madison (Ph.D.)
- Scientific career
- Fields: Theoretical physics, mathematical physics, quantitative finance
- Workplaces: Jump Trading, University of Chicago, University of Wisconsin–Madison, Stanford University, University of Amsterdam

William Jensen Cottrell (born 1980) is an American theoretical physicist, mathematician, and financial professional. He worked as a quantitative researcher and portfolio manager at Jump Trading and serves as a lecturer in the Financial Mathematics program at the University of Chicago.

As a graduate student in physics at the California Institute of Technology in the early 2000s, Cottrell became involved in a federal case related to Earth Liberation Front–linked arsons of sport utility vehicles in Southern California. In 2005 he was convicted on multiple counts, including arson and conspiracy to commit arson. A letter in Cottrell's defense, signed by Stephen Hawking and other prominent scientists, was distributed to prison authorities and the U.S. 9th Circuit Court of Appeals at Cottrell's October 18, 2006 hearing. The Ninth Circuit Court of Appeals vacated his arson convictions and corresponding sentence.

Following his release from federal custody, Cottrell completed a Ph.D. in theoretical and mathematical physics at the University of Wisconsin–Madison and held research positions at the University of Amsterdam and Stanford University before moving into quantitative finance.

== Early life ==
Cottrell graduated from the University of Chicago in 2002 as a double major in physics and mathematics. He competed for the university's Division III cross country team, where he was often called the "team genius". After graduating, he was accepted to the graduate physics program at Caltech, where he would meet Tyler Johnson, who was also studying physics and finishing up his undergraduate work.

== SUV arsons ==
In August 2003, while a graduate student at Caltech, Cottrell and fellow physics student Tyler Johnson discussed placing bumper stickers on SUVs reading "SUV = TERRORISM" to draw attention to the environmental impact of large vehicles. In a series of emails later recovered by the FBI, Cottrell corresponded with friends about purchasing the stickers and wrote under the pseudonym "Tony Marsden" to the Los Angeles Times regarding vandalism and arsons at SUV dealerships and residential areas that authorities linked to the Earth Liberation Front.

== Trial ==
Cottrell was arrested in March 2004 after law enforcement traced the "Tony Marsden" emails to him. In an October 24, 2004 federal grand jury indictment he was charged with conspiracy to commit arson, multiple counts of arson, and one count of using a destructive device during a crime of violence.

At trial, Cottrell's lawyers stated that he had been diagnosed with Asperger syndrome and sought to introduce expert testimony about how the condition affected his judgment and susceptibility to influence. Judge Gary Klausner limited the extent to which Asperger-related evidence could be presented as part of the defense. Cottrell admitted being present during the incidents but denied throwing Molotov cocktails, testifying that Johnson had planned and carried out the arsons and that he had not initially understood that arson was being contemplated.

An informal network of Cottrell supporters formed, led by the Earth Liberation Front Prisoner's Network and a "Free Billy Cottrell" organization. Supporters portrayed him as a highly gifted but socially isolated student who had been drawn into actions planned by others and then prosecuted as a principal actor. After Cottrell publicly identified Johnson as the mastermind, some activists in the radical environmental movement withdrew their backing, criticizing his cooperation with authorities and issuing statements distancing themselves from the campaign on his behalf.

== Appeal ==
On 8 September 2009, Cottrell's convictions and sentences for arson were overturned by the 9th U.S. Circuit Court of Appeals. However, the conspiracy conviction and sentence were affirmed. The omission of Cottrell's diagnosis of Asperger syndrome during his 2004 trial played a key role in the decision.

== Imprisonment ==
An article in the LA Weekly reported that Billy was being mistreated by prison guards who have labeled him a "terrorist". According to the article, he was not permitted to study physics or Mandarin Chinese, was not permitted to teach the other prisoners calculus, and had had his books and papers removed without being given a reason.

A letter in Cottrell's defense, signed by Stephen Hawking and other prominent scientists, was distributed to prison authorities and the U.S. 9th Circuit Court of Appeals at Cottrell's October 18, 2006 hearing. He was then transferred into another federal prison with less violent prisoners. Cottrell was then able to study subjects that he was denied at the last prison and no longer had a roommate.

== Later life ==
Cottrell was released on August 16, 2011. After his release from prison he completed his Ph.D. in theoretical and mathematical physics at the University of Wisconsin-Madison and postdoctorate research at the University of Amsterdam and Stanford University.

== Documentary film ==
A documentary film on Cottrell, titled Standard Deviation, was written and directed by David Randag and Chris Brannan in 2008. In 2009, it won the Emmy for best student documentary at the Academy of Television Arts & Sciences Foundation's 30th College Television Awards.
