= Lanza's =

Defunct restaurant in New York City, U.S.

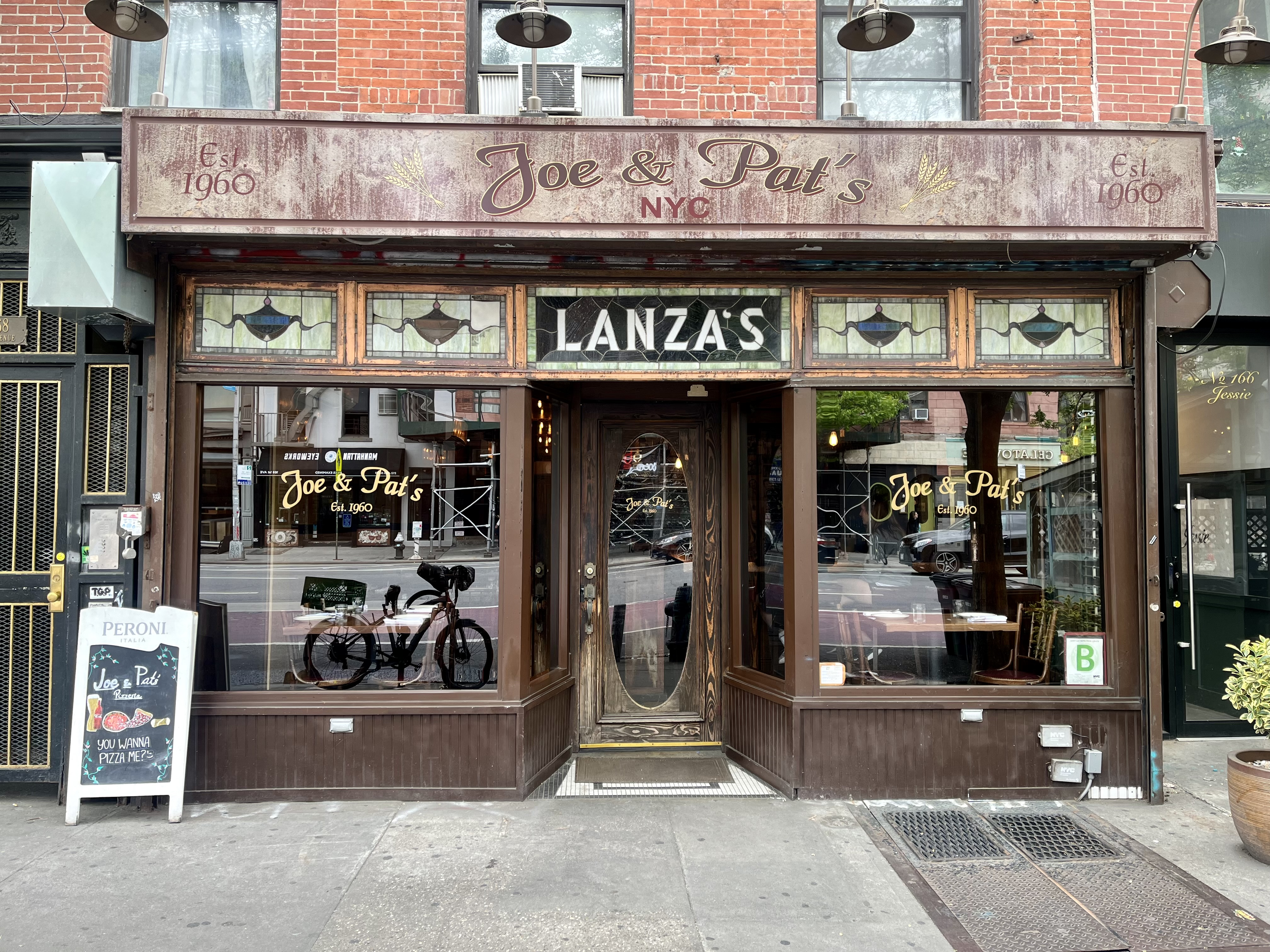
- The former site of Lanza's in 2024
- Interactive map of Lanza's

Restaurant information
- Established: 1904
- Previous owner: Michael Lanza
- Location: 168 First Avenue, New York City, New York, 10009, United States
- Coordinates: 40°43′44.2″N 73°59′2.7″W

Lanza’s was an Italian restaurant in the East Village, Manhattan. It was opened in 1904 by Italian immigrant Michael Lanza in a tenement built in 1871. Lanza was rumored to have been a chef for Victor Emmanuel III of Italy. It closed sometime between 2015 and 2017, reportedly after seizure by a marshal for non-payment of taxes. The former restaurant's murals, stained glass, and sign were retained by Joe and Pat's, a pizzeria that opened at the location in 2018.

They were known to be a favorite of Lucky Luciano, Carmine “Lilo” Galante and Joseph “Socks” Lanza.

== Popular culture ==
Lanza’s was a filming location for Woody Allen’s Manhattan Murder Mystery and Alan Parker’s Angel Heart. It also appeared in season 3, episode 3 of The Naked City.
