= Henry Lascoe =

American actor (1912–1964)

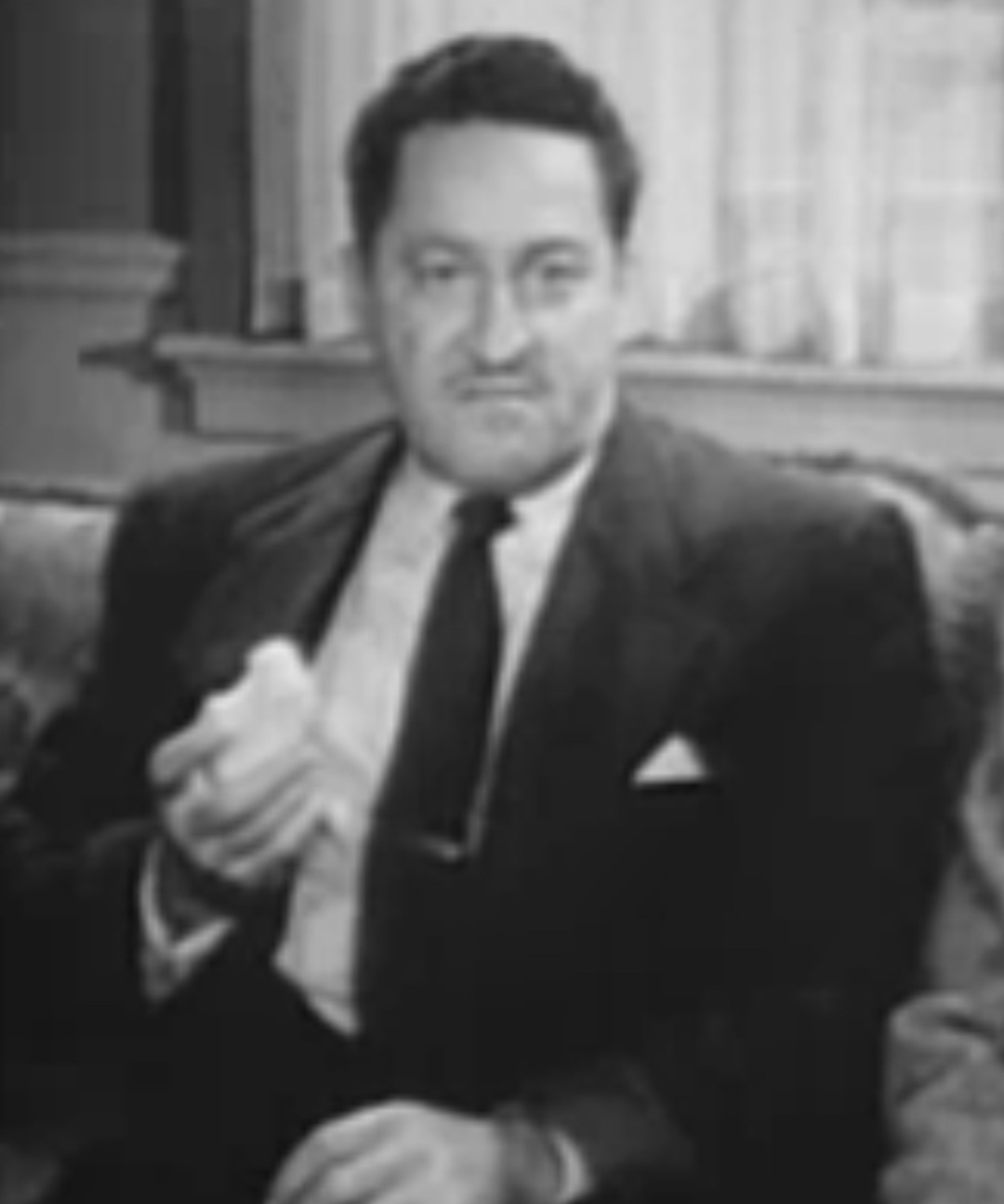
- Lascoe in an episode of Man Against Crime (1952)
- Born: May 30, 1912; New York City, U.S.
- Died: September 1, 1964 (aged 52); Hollywood, California, U.S.
- Resting place: Montefiore Cemetery, Springfield Gardens, Queens, New York, U.S.
- Occupation: Actor
- Years active: 1948–1964

Henry Lascoe (May 30, 1912 – September 1, 1964) was an American actor.

== Biography ==
Lascoe was born in New York City, New York, on May 30, 1912, and was a screen and stage actor from 1948 until 1964.

In the mid-1930s, Lascoe was active with the Little Theatre in Brooklyn, New York. His Broadway credits include Arturo Ui (1963), Carnival! (1961), Romanoff and Juliet (1957), Silk Stockings (1955), Fanny (1954), Wonderful Town (1953), Call Me Madam (1950), Now I Lay Me Down to Sleep (1950), Me and Molly (1948), Tenting Tonight (1947), The Rugged Path (1945), Brooklyn, U.S.A. (1941), Out of the Frying Pan (1941), and Journey to Jerusalem (1940).

He appeared as a gambling boss on "The Case of the Singing Skirt," an episode of Perry Mason, on March 12, 1960. He appeared in the final hour long episode of The Twilight Zone, "The Bard", with Burt Reynolds in May 1963. He died of a heart attack while working on an episode of "A Day in Court" on September 1, 1964 in Hollywood, California. He was interred at Montefiore Cemetery in Springfield Gardens, Queens.
