= Tom Ahearne =

Irish rugby union player

- Born: Thomas Ahearne Blarney, Ireland

Rugby union career
Senior career
Years	Team	Apps	(Points)
- Queens College, Cork R.F.C.
International career
Years	Team	Apps	(Points)
1899	Ireland	1	

Tom Ahearne was an Irish rugby international. He won one cap in the 1899 Home Nations Championship helping Ireland to win the first game of their Triple Crown against England on 4 February 1899 played at home at Lansdowne Road. In the game, a good defence by Ireland gave them a 6–0 victory, their fourth successive win over the English.

Ahearne, from Blarney, was due to play for the Cork club, Dohenys, in the 1897 All-Ireland Senior Football Championship Final on the following day, 5 February 1899 but did not turn up.
