= Allan Frank =

- Birth name: Frederick Allan Frank
- Born: October 24, 1950 (age 74)
- Origin: Peoria, Illinois, U.S.
- Genres: Americana country
- Occupation(s): Singer, songwriter, musician
- Instrument(s): Vocals, guitar
- Years active: 2007–present
- Labels: Apple Farm Music
- Website: allanfrankmusic.com

Frederick Allan Frank (born October 24, 1950) is an American singer, songwriter, and performer from Peoria, Illinois.

== Biography ==
Frank attended Quincy College (now Quincy University) where he earned his Bachelor of Fine Arts in theater. It was there that he developed an interest in songwriting. Following college, he traveled Europe and formed the short-lived band Deliverance in Hamburg, Germany. After the disbanding of Deliverance, he relocated to Los Angeles where he began working in the Aerospace and Defense industry while still writing songs in his spare time. He retired from the Aerospace industry and began songwriting full-time.

In 2000, Frank won first place for Best Country song in the Unisong International Song Contest. In 2007 he began working his own material, and in 2009 he released his first full-length album entitled The Road So Far on the independent label, Apple Farm Music.

== Discography ==
=== Albums ===
- The Road So Far (2009)
