= Ciaran Hope =

Irish composer and business consultant

- Born: Dublin, Ireland
- Citizenship: Ireland
- Occupation: Composer
- Spouse: Rebecca O'Mara

Ciaran Hope (born 4 August 1974) is an Irish composer of orchestral, choral, and film music, who has also held a range of business roles. He is the composer of Hollywood film soundtracks such as Screw Cupid, Truth About Kerry as well as the contemplative soundtrack for The Letters, based on the life of Mother Teresa of Calcutta. He has also worked extensively in contemporary music since graduating from Trinity College Dublin. He has written a violin concerto for Cora Venus Lunny, a clarinet quartet for the Czech Clarinet Quartet, and his vocal works have been performed internationally by choirs such as Pfizerphonics and Ireland's 2016 choir of the year, Voci Nuove.

== Early life and education ==
Born in Dublin and growing up in the County Meath village of Dunboyne, Hope was involved with music from early childhood: his mother Kitty played the violin and viola as well as teaching in the DIT College of Music (Chatham Row) and his sister Grainne is a professional cellist. He studied music from a young age and developed a keen interest in clarinet and composition during his teenage years. He attended school at Castleknock College before completing B.A. and B.A.I. degrees in Mathematics and Engineering at Trinity College Dublin. Hope continued his composition studies under the supervision of Ladislav Kubik at the Czech American Summer Music Institute in the Prague Conservatory throughout his college years. He later received a master's degree in Engineering and Music from Trinity College Dublin in 1998. After winning the IMRO Prize for composition at the RTÉ Musician of the Future competition for his solo clarinet piece Diptych, he moved to Los Angeles to attend the UCLA Film Scoring Program on a Fulbright Scholarship.

== Career and works ==
In 1999, he worked as part of the orchestrating team on the score of the Hollywood feature film The Insider, which was nominated for a Golden Globe Award. He founded two businesses in California providing post-production musical services to the film and TV industry.

Hope undertook composer residencies at the Tyrone Guthrie artist's retreat in County Monaghan and the Cill Rialaig artist's retreat in County Kerry with the support of a 2011 Tyrone Guthrie Centre regional bursary award and a 2012 Cill Rialaig residency award. Also in 2012, his scores for Truth About Kerry (2010) and End of the Innocents (2011) were both nominated for a gold medal for Excellence in their respective categories at the Park City Film Music Festival. In 2012 he also provided string arrangements for Irish band Senakah's album Human Relations which was produced by Cranberries guitarist and songwriter Noel Hogan, and recorded in 27 days in the former Bishop's Palace in Limerick.

Hope spent four months as the 2013 Composer-in-residence at the Centre Culturel Irlandais in Paris, where he worked on several pieces including a suite of music for children's orchestras based on a cultural tour of Paris and an opera about revolutionary Robert Emmet's time in France.

In 2013, he began work on the orchestral score for the Hollywood film The Letters based on the life of Mother Teresa of Calcutta. Recorded with the Macedonian Radio Symphony Orchestra in Mother Teresa's home town of Skopje, Macedonia, and with New Dublin Voices choir in her spiritual birthplace of Dublin, Ireland, the score was completed in the summer of 2014 and the film went on release in the US on 4 December 2015. The score has also received many live performances, most notably in the Pantheon in Rome by PfizerPfonics. Sony Classical released a soundtrack album for the film in 2016, featuring 23 tracks from Hope's score and the Leona Lewis song "Run". Following the album's release, Hope took a career break to complete an MBA at the UCD Michael Smurfit Graduate Business School in 2017.

Having worked in a senior role with Web Summit, Hope announced in a 2021 Linkedin article about "Creativity and its role in strategic thinking", that he had accepted a senior role as Director in Innovation and Experience Design with Ernst & Young. In May 2025, he moved to Re-turn, the operator of Ireland's bottle and can deposit return scheme as chief operating officer.

== Personal life ==
Hope is married to Irish actress Rebecca O'Mara, and is the brother-in-law of actor, Jason O'Mara.

== Film credits ==
=== Composer ===
Discography
Feature films
Year	Title	Director	Notes	Distributed by
1998	The Face of Alexandre Dumas: The Man in the Iron Mask	William Richert	Composer: additional score	
2000	The Groom	Víctor Cárdenas	Short film	
2002	When Angels Cry	Narendra Reddy	Short film	
2003	Manfast	Tara Judelle	Composer: additional music	
2004	Interrogation	Christopher Alexander	Short film	
2005	GRACE	Antonia Scarpa		
2005	Hollywood Horror	Bernt Amadeus Capra		
2005	All In	Reggie Jordan		
2006	Little Star	David Plane	Short film	
2007	The Healing	Nancy Hendrickson	Short film	
2007	Martin Did It	Brian McNett	Short film	
2007	LA Noir	Conrad Jackson	Short film	
2008	Rend	Brian Lazarte (as Brian David Lazarte)	Short film	
2008	Screw Cupid	Sanjeev Sirpal		Film1 Sundance Channel
2010	Truth about Kerry	Katie Torpey		Opus Distribution
2010	Milk Carton	Sanjeev Sirpal	Short film	
2010	Lovepocalypse	Sanjeev Sirpal	Short film	
2010	Fresh Suicide	Anupam Barve	Short film	
2011	End of the Innocents	Chesher Cat (as Deborah Chesher)	Short film	
2014	The Letters	William Riead		Freestyle Releasing, Cinema West Films
2016	Roll Camera	Alannah Murray	Short film	
2016	Speedballs	Cody Farren	Short film	
Documentaries
Year	Title	Director	Notes	Distributed by
2012	Mud Pies & Kites: Death & Resurrection in Haiti	Gerard Thomas Straub		
Television
Year	Title	Director	Notes	Distributed by
2005	Here! Family		Episodes: 1.2 & 1.3	
2009	Joni and Friends		Episodes: Ryan: A Legacy of Hope & Family Retreat	

=== Sound department ===
Feature films
Year	Title	Director	Role	Distributed by
2002	Virginia's Run	Peter Markle	Sound editing	Alliance Atlantis (Canada) & MGM Home Entertainment (United States)
2005	GRACE	Antonia Scarpa	Re-recording mixer	
2005	All In	Reggie Jordan	Re-recording mixer	
2006	Little Star	David Plane	Re-recording mixer & Sound editor	
2007	The Healing	Nancy Hendrickson	Re-recording mixer & Sound editor	
2007	LA Noir	Conrad Jackson	Re-recording mixer & Sound editor	
2008	Screw Cupid	Sanjeev Sirpal	Re-recording mixer & Sound editor	Film1 Sundance Channel
2010	Milk Carton	Sanjeev Sirpal	Re-recording mixer & Sound editor	
2010	Lovepocalypse	Sanjeev Sirpal	Re-recording mixer & Sound editor	
2010	iHeart	Sanjeev Sirpal	Re-recording mixer & Sound editor	
Documentaries
Year	Title	Director	Notes	Distributed by
2001	Friends Forever	Ben Wolfinsohn	Sound editor	
2003	Betty Blowtorch and Her Amazing True Life Adventures	Antonia Scarpa	Additional sound mixer	
Television
Year	Title	Director	Role	Distributed by
2005	Here! Family Episodes: 1.2 & 1.3		Re-recording mixer	

=== Music Department ===
Discography
Feature films
Year	Title	Director	Role	Distributed by
1999	Turbulence II: Fear of Flying	David Mackay	Assistant music editor (uncredited)	Trimark Pictures
1999	Held Up	Steve Rash	Assistant music editor	Trimark Pictures
1999	The Insider	Michael Mann	Orchestrator (uncredited)	Spyglass Entertainment
2001	Killer Bud	Karl T. Hirsch	Assistant music editor	Trimark Pictures
2003	Wrong Hollywood Number	José Antonio W. Danner	Additional music scoring mixer	
2003	Beat the Drum	David Hickson	Virgil Films & Entertainment	Music editor
2003	The Devil and Daniel Webster	Alec Baldwin	Music editor (uncredited)	
2005	All In	Reggie Jordan	Orchestrator Musician: piano	
2005	GRACE	Antonia Scarpa	Orchestrator Musician: woodwinds, piano	
2005	Black Oasis	Andrew Lewis	Music scoring mixer	Vision Video
2006	Little Star	David Plane	Orchestrator Music scoring mixer Musician: woodwinds, piano	
2007	The Healing	Nancy Hendrickson	Orchestrator Music scoring mixer Musician: woodwinds, piano	
2008	Screw Cupid	Sanjeev Sirpal	Orchestrator Music scoring mixer Musician: woodwinds, piano	Film1 Sundance Channel
2010	Truth about Kerry	Katie Torpey	Orchestrator Music supervisor Musician: woodwinds, piano	Opus Distribution
2010	Milk Carton	Sanjeev Sirpal	Music supervisor	
2010	iHeart	Sanjeev Sirpal	Music supervisor	
2011	End of the Innocents	Chesher Cat (as Deborah Chesher)	Original score mixer	
2012	Mud Pies & Kites: Death & Resurrection in Haiti	Gerard Thomas Straub	Music scoring mixer Musician: woodwinds, piano	Pax et Bonum Communications
2012	What If	Christopher Papakaliatis	Pro Tools editing	Village Films
2014	The Letters	William Riead	Music producer	Freestyle Releasing, Cinema West Films
2014	Dinner for few	Athanassios Vakalis	Pro Tools music editor	
