= Deposit return schemes in the United Kingdom =

Planned UK container deposit schemes

From 1 October 2027, three deposit return schemes (DRSs) are set to be introduced in the United Kingdom; one covering England and Northern Ireland, one for Scotland and one for Wales.

A refundable deposit is planned to be added to the price of drinks in certain types of single-use containers which can be refunded by consumers by returning the empty container to a designated return point.

The three systems are legislated separately, as they concern devolved matters, with Wales's system including glass bottles and a reuse system. Each scheme is enforced by the environmental regulator of each country. The UK Deposit Management Organisation, trading as 'Exchange for Change', is to operate the scheme across the UK.

Scotland previously proposed a separate scheme from 2020, but was delayed due to the COVID-19 pandemic and later opposition from the UK Government for the inclusion of glass in the Scottish scheme. While proposals for a scheme in England were raised by the government in 2018.

== Planned schemes ==
The deposit return schemes for drinks containers are planned to be introduced across the United Kingdom from 1 October 2027. A refundable deposit is to be added to the price of drinks in single-use containers which can be refunded by consumers by returning the empty container to a designated point.

Waste and resource policy are devolved policies, therefore each of the devolved administrations are to legislate their DRSs separately. Legally, there are to be three schemes in the United Kingdom, one covering both England and Northern Ireland, one for Scotland, and one for Wales. The environmental regulators in each of the four administrations will enforce the scheme.

However, the United Kingdom Internal Market Act 2020, legislates generally goods sold in one part of the UK must be accepted in all parts of the UK, unless granted an exception by the act following a request. Therefore, more different schemes across the UK covering different materials, may cause challenges to UK-wide labelling and machine compatibility. Scotland's first attempt of a separate scheme to include glass was rejected by the UK Government in 2023, while Wales has continued plans to include glass.

Members of the UK Parliament had called for a UK scheme in 2017, and proposals for one in England were put forward in 2018.

=== England and Northern Ireland ===
England and Northern Ireland's scheme is to cover drinks containers ranging from 150 millilitres (0.26 imp pt) to 3 litres (5.3 imp pt), that are made from polyethylene terephthalate plastic, aluminium or steel, and are likely to be single-use or used for a short time. Containers with a lid are also part of the scheme. It will exclude containers not for single use, made of high-density polyethylene (like milk bottles), or containers used for flavour enhancers, sweetners or liquid medicines. The scheme in England and Northern Ireland will not cover glass, following a UK Government decision.

The DRS in England and Northern Ireland is permitted by the Environment Act 2021, and further legislated by the Deposit Scheme for Drinks Containers (England and Northern Ireland) Regulations 2025, setting the responsibilities for producers, retailers and the scheme's administrator.

In May 2025, the UK Deposit Management Organisation (UK DMO) was appointed as the operator of the scheme in England and Northern Ireland, and trades under the name 'Exchange for Change'. The operator announcedin April 2026, the deposit would be 20p on all containers covered by the scheme upon its planned October 2027 launch.

The DRS is to be enforced by the Environment Agency and Trading Standards in England, and the Northern Ireland Environment Agency in Northern Ireland.

=== Scotland ===
Scotland's scheme is to cover drinks containers ranging from 150 millilitres (0.26 imp pt) to 3 litres (5.3 imp pt), that are made from polyethylene terephthalate plastic, aluminium or steel, like in England and Northern Ireland. The scheme in Scotland will not cover glass, following a UK Government decision.

The DRS in Scotland is permitted by the Climate Change (Scotland) Act 2009. There were initial plans for a DRS in Scotland in 2020, which included glass, however it was delayed to 2022 due to the COVID-19 pandemic and later due to issues with the UK Internal Market Act. The original scheme was to be administrated by the drinks industry-funded company Circularity Scotland, which went into administration in 2023. The summer 2023 launch was delayed due to the UK Government refusing permission for glass to be included in the Scottish scheme, arguing instead for a UK-wide approach. Lorna Slater, Scottish Greens co-leader, accused the UK Government of "sabotage" after rejecting Scotland's inclusion of glass in their scheme.

Later legislation such as the Deposit and Return Scheme for Scotland Amendment Regulations 2025 and the Deposit and Return Scheme for Scotland (Designation of Scheme Administrator) Order 2025 has been passed in preparation for the new scheme's implementation, with the new Scottish scheme being aligned with the one in England and Northern Ireland.

In May 2025, the UK Deposit Management Organisation (UK DMO), trading as Exchange for Change, was appointed as the operator of the scheme in Scotland. The operator announced the deposit would be 20p on all containers covered by the scheme upon its planned October 2027 launch.

=== Wales ===
The DRS for Wales is permitted by the Environment Act 2021 and further legislated by the Deposit Scheme for Drinks Containers (Wales) Regulations 2026.

Exchange for Change, the operator of the scheme in the other three UK countries, was the only known applicant. They had first proposed only 100 glass-accepting machines in Wales upon launch compared to the estimated 3,500 required by the Welsh Government. The new Plaid Cymru-led Welsh Government appointed them as Wales's operator in August 2026.

The Welsh scheme is to also include a reuse scheme although no legislation setting this out has been made as of July 2026.

In December 2020, parts of Conwy County Borough operated a pilot DRS scheme.

==== Inclusion of glass ====
The Welsh scheme is to also cover glass bottles, unlike in the rest of the UK, although initially without a deposit to avoid immediate changes to labelling and bottle distribution. A UK minister blamed Wales' inclusion of glass as to why the UK schemes were delayed in 2024, with Huw Irranca-Davies, Wales's Cabinet Secretary for Climate Change, describing the comments as a "threat" and that "restrict[s] our ability to go further and impose a watered-down DRS on Wales". Irranca-Davies withdrew the Welsh Government from the joint process of developing a UK-wide deposit return scheme, citing his ambition to include glass and a reuse scheme, and criticising the UK Internal Market Act.

The Senedd approved the glass-inclusive scheme in March 2026. Wales is estimated to require 3,500 glass-accepting reverse vending machines upon the October 2027 launch.

In 2026, representatives of the hospitality, retail and drinks sectors have argued the inclusion of glass may raise costs to deliver the Welsh scheme, such as to develop machines that also accept glass, with such costs likely would be passed onto consumers, or products withdrawn from Wales. The British Soft Drinks Association claimed the Welsh scheme may lead to a 50p increase to some bottles. Representatives also argued if this leads to disruption to the scheduled October 2027 launch in Wales with the rest of the UK, it could cause £300 million in cross-border fraud if there is a delay to the scheme in Wales. Keep Wales Tidy CEO, Owen Derbyshire, argued schemes operating across "different states or regions [...] has not led to widespread fraud".

== See also ==
- Deposit Return Scheme (Ireland)
