= Truth about Kerry =

- Directed by: Katherine Torpey
- Written by: Shaun O'Sullivan; Katherine Torpey
- Produced by: Shaun O'Sullivan
- Starring: Stana Katic; Jessica Dean; Darren Keefe
- Music by: Ciaran Hope
- Release date: April 2011
- Running time: 85 minutes
- Country: United States
- Language: English

Truth about Kerry is a 2011 suspense film. It was written by Shaun O'Sullivan and Katherine Torpey, directed by Katherine Torpey, produced by Shaun O'Sullivan, Katie Torpey & Tony Zanelotti, and stars Stana Katic, Jessica Dean and Darren Keefe. The film was shot in County Kerry, Ireland, and in San Francisco, California, USA. The film premiered in 2010 at the LA Femme Film Festival in Los Angeles, where it won the Best Screenplay Award and later, received its European premiere, in 2011, at the inaugural Charlie Chaplin Film Festival in Waterville, County Kerry, Ireland.

== Plot ==
Kerry Carlson goes to Ireland with her boyfriend, Hunter, to visit his childhood friend, Patrick. Two weeks later, Kerry is found dead on a beach. Her mysterious death has destroyed the world of her best friend Emma, who was supposed to go on the trip with her but canceled at the last minute. A few weeks after her death, Emma starts having nightmares about Kerry.

Emma travels to a remote village in Ireland to investigate the mysterious circumstances surrounding her best friend Kerry's death. Distraught by constant dreams and haunting visions of Kerry, Emma refuses to believe that the death was an accident. After arriving in the small, fishing village where Kerry died, Emma realizes the death was never really investigated and the locals don't want to talk to her. Her quest, to find out what really happened, targets one local villager named Patrick, who she believes may have been fatally obsessed with Kerry.

Desperate to prove that Patrick was involved, it isn't long before Emma believes that the village may be hiding more secrets than she thought, and that foul play may have led to Kerry's death... or murder.

Emma breaks into Patrick's house and finds pictures of Kerry. Eventually, she learns that Kerry had asked him to take those pictures after getting into a fight with Patrick at the local bar. Her fiancé arrives in town and Emma accuses him of being the cause of Kerry's death because of the timing of his proposal causing her to bail on the trip.

Emma comes to believe that Kerry killed herself and leaves with her fiancé after making amends with Patrick and asking him for one of Kerry's pictures. However, after she leaves it is revealed in a flashback that the friendly barkeep had taken Kerry to a secluded beach and brutally beat and raped her. Only pausing during the assault to pick up a phone call and answering it as if nothing was wrong. He then dragged her to the water and drowned her.

== Music ==
The score for Truth About Kerry was written by composer Ciaran Hope, who is best known for the soundtracks to many films, including The Letters, Screw Cupid, Hollywood Horror, and Grace.

The original score featured a collection of instrumental and vocal soloists mixed with electronic musical instruments to create a variety of soundscapes. Contributors included celebrated Irish violinist Cora Venus Lunny, soprano Anne Cecere, Rich Ploucher on violin, viola & cello, Colm Ó’Snodaigh (as Kíla) on whistles & flutes, fifth-generation Irish Uileann piper Kevin Rowsome, acoustic guitarist Jamie O'Connell, world-renowned Canadian percussionist Satnam Ramgotra, Ciaran Hope on woodwinds & piano, and the Lalo Guerrero School of Music Choir.

Working in close collaboration with the director and producer, Hope also utilized his ties with the Irish music industry to piece together a soundtrack with a distinctly Irish indie vibe, featuring songs by Irish bands Seneca, The West Seventies, Steve Gregan, Kíla, The Stunning, The Good Fight, Petrol, Eject and Shaun Davey's local Kerry band, Beal Tuinne. One additional musical track ("Cry for the Last Time") was provided by Marina V.

A subsequent soundtrack album was released by Pangea Music Inc in 2012. The score was also nominated for Best Impact of Music in a Feature Film at the 2012 Park City Film Music Festival.

== Cast ==
- Stana Katic as Emma
- Jessica Dean as Kerry
- Darren Keefe as Patrick
- Paul Hardiman as Joseph
- Ryan King as Daniel
- Rick Yudt as Hunter
