= Rebecca O'Mara =

Irish actress

- Born: 15 March 1977 (age 49); Sandycove, Dublin, Ireland
- Occupation: Actress
- Years active: 2006–present
- Spouse: Ciaran Hope
- Relatives: Jason O'Mara (brother)

Rebecca O'Mara (born 15 March 1977) is an Irish actress. The Dublin-born actress grew up by the sea in Sandycove and is the voice actor for Caitlin in the children's television series Thomas & Friends.

== Early life ==
O'Mara attended Holy Child Killiney before completing a degree in Drama and Theatre at Trinity College Dublin. On graduating, she moved to London and worked in film production for some years. In 2004, she began her acting training at the London Academy of Music and Dramatic Art (LAMDA).

== Career ==
She has also worked extensively in theatre in the UK and Ireland since graduating from the London Academy of Music and Dramatic Art (LAMDA). She played Minnie Larkins in The History of Mr Polly, Mrs. O Keefe in the 2014 Ken Loach film Jimmy's Hall and has guest starred in various television programmes including Line of Duty and Doctors, but is probably best known for her role as scene of crime officer, Frankie Hynes, in TV3's Red Rock. In 2018, at the Mick Lally Theatre in Galway, she starred in Druid Theatre's production of Furniture, a "wickedly insightful comedy" from Sonya Kelly. In March 2019, she won the Irish Times Theatre Award for Best Actress in a Supporting Role for the performance.

== Personal life ==
She is married to Irish composer Ciaran Hope and is the younger sister of actor, Jason O'Mara.

== Filmography ==
=== Television ===
Year	Title	Character	Production	Notes
2007	Doctors	Cleo Tucker	BBC One	Episode: "Background Noise"
2013–2015	Thomas & Friends	Caitlin and a Slip Coach	HIT Entertainment	Episodes: "Calm Down Caitlin", "Not So Slow Coaches", "Duck and the Slip Coaches", "Last Train for Christmas", "The Truth About Toby", "Best Engine Ever"
2016	Line of Duty	Rachel O' Connor	BBC	Episode #3.1
2016	Line of Duty	Rachel O' Connor	BBC	Episode #3.2
2017	Red Rock	Frankie Hynes	TV3	Episode #4.29
2017	Red Rock	Frankie Hynes	TV3	Episode #4.30 - Season Finale
2019	Bump	Colette	Blue Ink Films in association with RTÉ	Full Season
2020	Doctors	Bethany Hastings	BBC One	Episode: "Peccata Mundi"
2023	Smother	Sheahan	RTÉ	Season 3 episodes 1,2 & 6
2024	Der Irland-Krimi	Edna Joye	Beta Film	Season 5
2025	Hidden Assets	Alice Heaslip	RTÉ	Season 3

=== Film ===
Year	Title	Character	Notes
2007	The History of Mr. Polly	Minnie Larkins	TV movie
2010	Laika	Laikia (voice)	Short
2013	Thomas & Friends: King of the Railway	Caitlin	
2014	Jimmy's Hall	Nora O' Keefe	Director: Ken Loach
2016	Thomas & Friends: The Great Race	Caitlin	
2020	Herself	Grainne	Director: Phyllida Lloyd
2023	The Toxic Avenger	Shelly Gooze	Director: Macon Blair
2024	Morning After	Carmel	Director: Dorothy Duffy
2024	Beetlejuice Beetlejuice	Jody Welch	Director: Tim Burton
2025	Anniversary	Enumerator	Director: Jan Komasa

== Theatre ==
Year	Title	Character	Production	Director
2006	06/07/05		Arcola	Hamish Pirie
2007	Salt Meets Wound	Various	Theatre 503	Paul Robinson
2007	Minsk	Minsk	Bush Theatre at Latitude	Josie Rourke
2008	Deep Blue Sea	Ann	Theatre Royal Bath/ West End	Edward Hall
2008	Far From the Madding Crowd	Bathsheba	English Touring Theatre (ETT)	Kate Saxon
2009	The Yalta Game	Anna	Gate Theatre, Dublin & Edinburgh International Theatre Festivals	Patrick Mason
2010	Danton's Death	Lucille	Royal National Theatre, London	Michael Grandage
2011	Moment	Ruth Pigeon	The Bush Theatre	David Horan
2012	Hayfever	Sorel Bliss	Gate Theatre, Dublin	Patrick Mason
2013	Mrs Warren's Profession	Vivie Warren	Gate Theatre, Dublin	Patrick Mason
2014	Pride and Prejudice	Caroline Bingley	Gate Theatre, Dublin	Alan Stanford
2014	The Vortex	Clara Hibbert	Gate Theatre, Dublin	Annabelle Comyn
2014	Aristocrats	Alice	Abbey Theatre, Dublin	Patrick Mason
2014	Wuthering Heights	Isabella Linton	Gate Theatre, Dublin	Michael Barker Cavan
2015	Chekhov's First Play	Sasha	Dublin Theatre Festival	Bush Moukarzel/Ben Kidd
2016	Othello	Desdemona	Abbey Theatre, Dublin	Joe Dowling
2016	Helen and I	Lynn	Druid Theatre, Dublin	Annabelle Comyn
2017	Private Lives	Amanda	Gate Theatre, Dublin	Patrick Mason
2018	Describe the Night	Yevgenia	Hampstead Theatre, London	Lisa Spirling
2018	Furniture	Dee	Gate Theatre, Dublin	Cathal Cleary
2021	All the Angels	Susannah	Smock Alley Theatre & The Everyman Theatre	Lynn Parker
2022	The Last Return	Umbrella Woman	Gate Theatre & Druid Theatre Company Production, Dublin	Sara Joyce
2023	The Quare Fellow	Lifer & Governor	Abbey Theatre, Dublin	Tom Creed
2024	Children of the Sun	Lisa	Abbey Theatre, Dublin	Lynne Parker

== Awards and nominations ==
Year	Association	Category	Work	Result	Ref.
2019	Irish Times Theatre Awards	Best Supporting Actress	Furniture	Won	
