= Marina Verenikina =

Russian musician (born 1978)

Marina Verenikina Марина Вереникинa
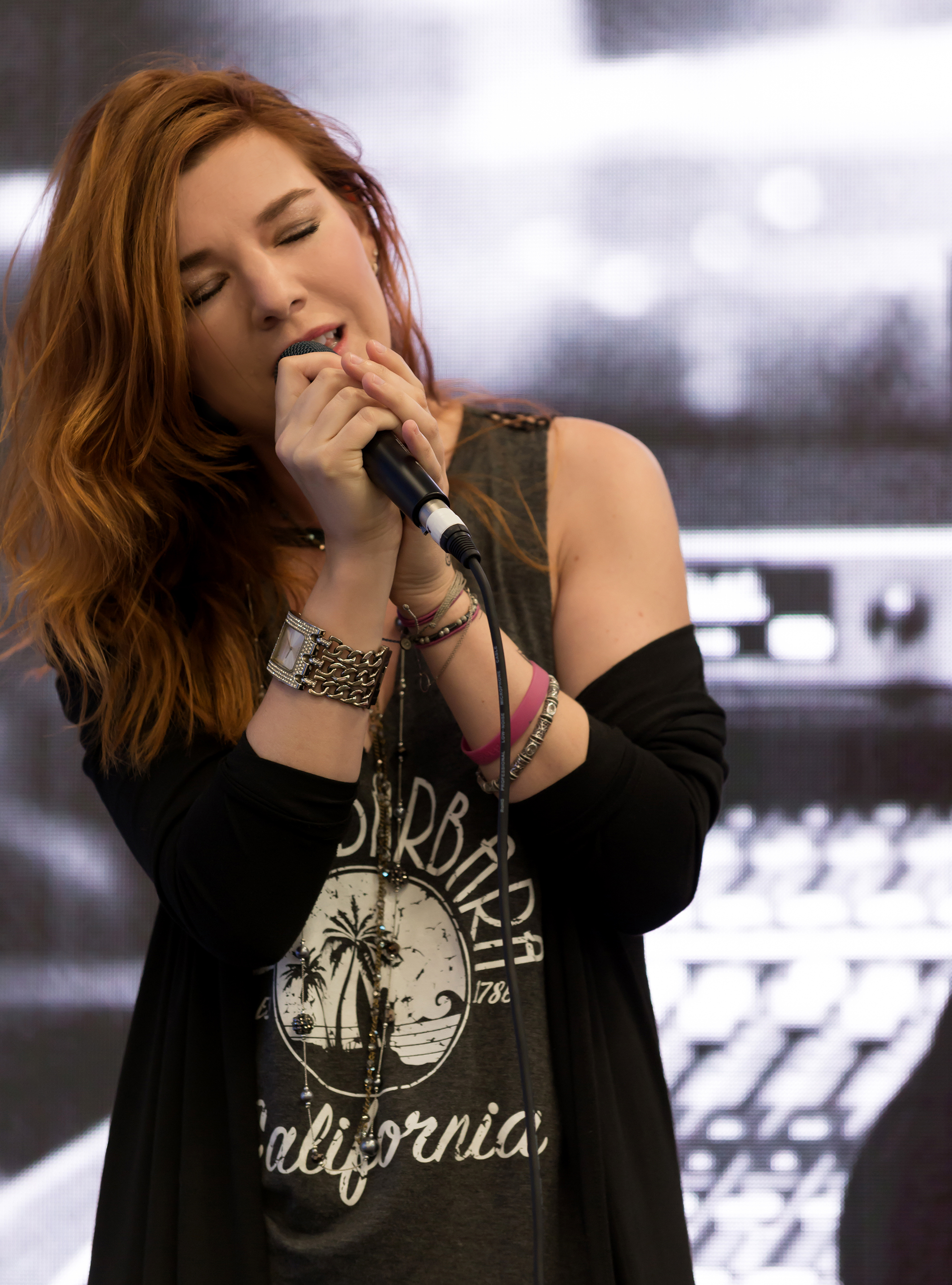

Background information
- Also known as: Marina V
- Born: Marina Gennadievna Verenikina; October 3, 1978 (age 48)
- Origin: Moscow, Soviet Union
- Genres: Pop, acoustic
- Occupations: Singer, musician
- Years active: 1999–present
- Spouse: Nick Baker
- Website: Marina V's Official Website

Marina Gennadievna Verenikina (3 October 1978), known as Marina V, is a Russian-American singer and musician. She has released 12 albums and toured internationally, having performed at over 1,500 concerts.

== Early life and education ==
Verenikina was born in Moscow, Russia in 1978. Her father, Gennadiy, was a nuclear physicist, and her mother, Irina, was a child psychologist. Verenikina began writing songs at 4 years of age, and attended classical music school every day after her regular school day, from age 6 until age 14; she would eventually graduate summa cum laude. At the time, the Soviet Union was falling apart and more western music started appearing on the market; as a child Verenikina was mostly exposed to classical music.. When she was 10 years old, Verenikina performed one of her original compositions for her piano teacher, who dismissed it as "nonsense"; this resulted in Verenikina becoming discouraged and stopping writing for a while, until becoming inspired to write songs again after a friend gave her a bootleg cassette of The Beatles. She learned many Beatles songs, which also helped her improve her understanding of the English language.

Verenikina won a national competition at the age of 15, beating over 100,000 peers, for a fully funded scholarship (Future Leaders Exchange (FLEX)) to study in the United States. After living in Springfield, Illinois, for a year, she returned to Moscow and started working to save enough money to return to the US, where she felt a greater freedom for individual creativity. She subsequently learned that the Russian school system would give her no credit for her time studying in America, but managed to return to Springfield when she was 17 years old, having saved money for a plane ticket, and enrolled at Illinois College. While at Illinois College she was involved in the Concert Choir, International Club, and Investment Club. She graduated cum laude with a combined degree in international studies and economics-business and a minor in Spanish.

== Career ==
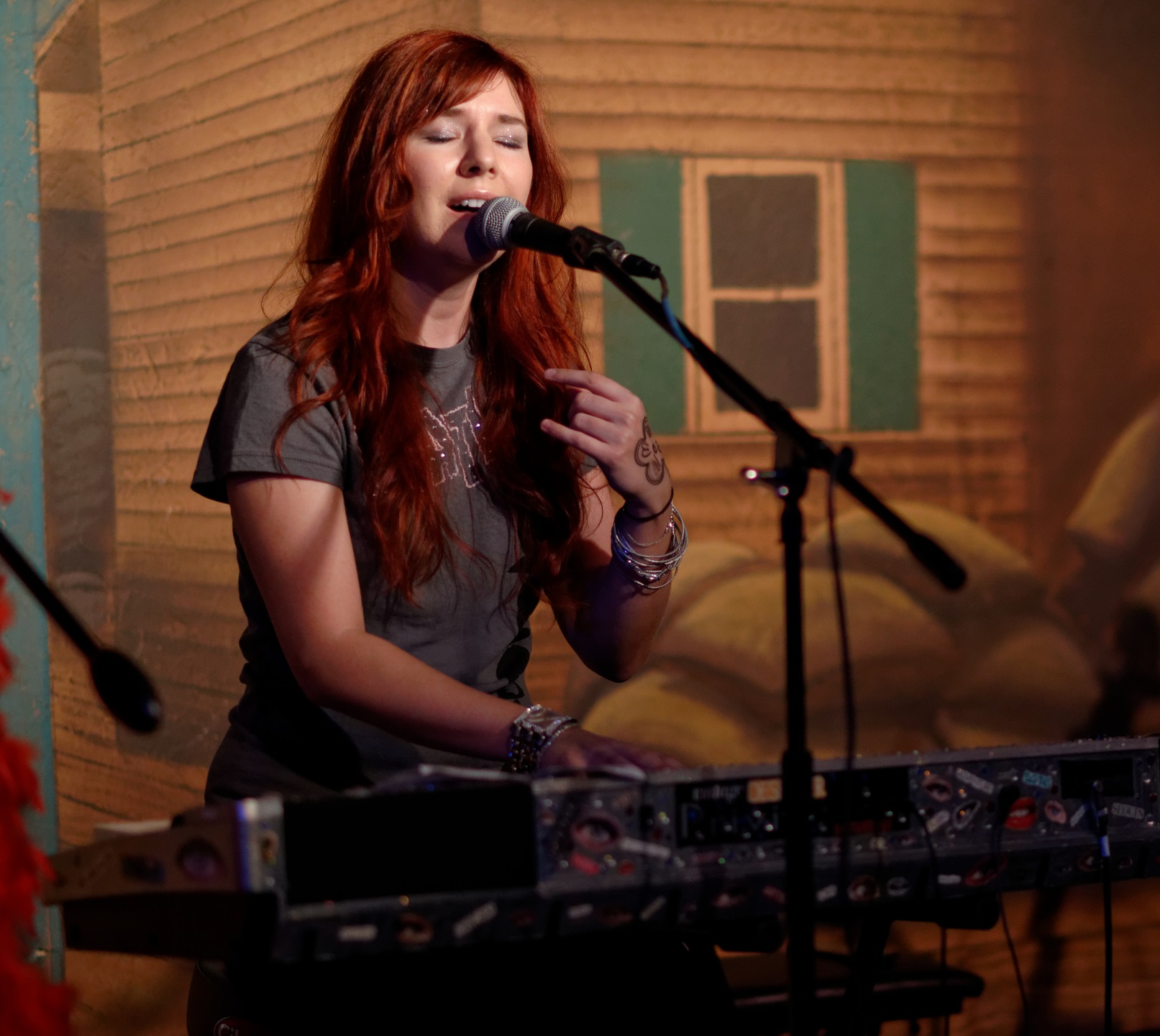
Performance in 2014.

Shortly after she turned 19, Verenikina met her future husband, guitarist Nicholas M Baker, who inspired her to take her musical talents seriously. She sold her pickup truck and bought a piano. She entered in her college's talent competition and sang her original composition "Leaving," winning first prize. She then decided to start recording her music and was able to finance a recording session for her debut CD Let Me Dream through, paid for by pre-orders from students and faculty members. Her first show, at a coffeehouse in Jacksonville, Illinois, was filled to capacity. Verenikina and Baker began writing songs together and began touring around Illinois, enjoying considerable success.

Verenikina and Baker moved to Los Angeles in 2001, the week after she graduated from Illinois College. Virtually unknown in Los Angeles, they accepted any gigs they could find — including a successful tour of several Borders — and sent out hundreds of demos to people in the music industry. Eventually they caught the attention of David Krebs, a manager who had worked with Don McLean, Trans-Siberian Orchestra, AC/DC and Aerosmith, among others.

In 2005, Verenikina collaborated with Jack Douglas. Douglas produced two tracks for her Simple Magic album: "Underneath Your Sky" and "Killing My Dream."

In 2006, Verenikina and Baker toured the Czech Republic and Slovakia, and by September Verenikina had released her first live album, Live at SoundMoves, which was recorded in one session at SoundMoves recording studios in Burbank, California.

In January 2008, Verenikina released Modern Fairytale, recorded with her band, and friend and engineer Jared Brown at the home studio of musician Graham Nash. The following year, the album's track "Sunshine Guaranteed" was featured on a popular iPhone game, Tap Tap Revenge2. Another song, "Pesnya o Tebe", appears in Direct Contact, a 2009 Danny Lerner film starring Dolph Lundgren.

Three years after the release of Modern Fairytale, Verenikina released My Star in January 2011, produced by Guy Erez; it was funded entirely by Verenikina's listeners who raised $30,000 for her. One of the songs, "Killing My Dream," featured guitarist and former Kiss member Bruce Kulick. That same year, several of Verenikina's songs aired on NBC's soap opera, Days of Our Lives, and in July 2011, she released an EP entitled "Small Collection of Interesting Songs," which featured three of the songs featured on the program.. The following year, Verenikina and Baker wrote the theme song for the 2012 film Truth About Kerry.. Her crowd-funded album Inner Superhero, featuring the song "Hello" with a video filmed in her native Moscow, won the 2013 Entrepreneurs On The Move award. The album was unofficially released in 2013, and in the September of that year, Verenikina's song "Begu" was featured in the Lifetime TV Movie Taken: The Search for Sophie Parker

In 2014, Verenkina embarked on her 2014 U.S. summer tour, C Minor To Shining Sea, and subsequently released her first tour documentary, "Enjoy The Ride," the following year in March 2015. Verenikina also appeared at The Grammy Museum in October 2014.

In 2017 Verenikina released her next fan-sponsored album, Born To The Stars. The official music video featured cameos from Steel Panther, Bruce Kulick of Kiss, David Ellefson of Megadeth, Thomas Ian Nicholas of American Pie and Jill Sobule, among many others. In the December of that year, Verenikina traveled to Moscow with the Grammy Museum team to open the first ever Grammy Museum exhibit in Russia. Her 2020 album, In V Minor, included an award-winning cover of the Pat Benatar song "We Belong", the only cover on an album otherwise consisting entirely of originals; Verenkina duetted with one of the song's co-writers, Dan Navarro, who also performed on guitar during the rendition. Beginning in 2021, Verenikina started writing lyrics for children's songs, including material for the Kote Kitty YouTube channels, with over 1,000,000,000 views to date.

In January 2025 Verenikina released a new single, "Symphony & Metal", featuring David Ellefson of Megadeth and Bruce Kulick of Kiss. The following month, her Russian-language song "Runaway Train / Я Как Стрела" was featured on Marvel's Your Friendly Neighborhood Spider-Man Season 1, Episode 4, on Disney+, and the following April her song "Begu", the Russian language version of her song "Run", appeared in The Amateur (2025 film), a 20th Century Studios movie starring Rami Malek (who also produced) and Laurence Fishburne. On June 11, 2025, Verenikina's Russian-language rendition of Kylie Minogue's 2001 hit Can't Get You Out of My Head aired in end credits of Nine Perfect Strangers Season 2, Episode 5 on Hulu.

== Personal life ==
Verenikina became an American citizen in 2006. She currently lives in Los Angeles with her husband Nick and their daughter, Violetta, and regularly performs on Twitch.

During her time back in Moscow after her scholarship to the United States, Verenikina learned that her parents were divorcing and her mother was moving to Australia,. Her father died in 2020, not long after the birth of her daughter, but due to the restrictions imposed by the coronavirus pandemic, Verenkina was unable to travel back to Russia for the funeral.

Verenkina has spoken openly and candidly about her struggles with depression and trauma, and beginning from her time at Illinois College she has produced material based around her experiences and relationships, channeling her emotions into music.

== Awards ==
- Hollywood Music Awards [nominated] (2009) for "You Make Me Beautiful"
- YouBloom International Songwriting Award (2010) for "You Make Me Beautiful"; Judges included Bob Geldof who gave Verenikina her trophy at the Awards Ceremony in London in February 2011
- Entrepreneurs On The Move Award (2013) for "Inner Superhero"
- Hollywood International Entertainment Award (2014), which recognizes artistic achievement & outstanding careers.
- Hollywood Music in Media Award (2019) for duet rendition of Pat Benatar's "We Belong" with Dan Navarro

== Discography ==
Year	Albums	EP	DVD
1999	Let Me Dream	-	-
2001	Lift	-	-
2003	Something of My Own	-	-
2005	Simple Magic	-	-
2006	Marina V: Live at SoundMoves	-	-
2007	Russian Bootleg	-	-
2008	Modern Fairytale	-	-
2011	My Star	Small Collection of Interesting Songs	-
2015	-	-	Enjoy the Ride: A Tour Documentary
2016	Russian Bootleg Vol. 2	-	-
2017	Inner Superhero	-	-
2017	Born to the Stars	-	-
2020	In V Minor	-	-
