= Nancy Hendrickson =

American actress

- Born: August 8, 1950 (age 75); Philadelphia, Pennsylvania, US
- Occupations: Actress, director, producer, writer
- Years active: 1980, 2007–2009

Nancy Hendrickson (born August 8, 1950) is an actress, director, producer and writer. She is known for being in the 1980 horror film Mother's Day.

== Career ==
Nancy starred as Abbey in the 1980 horror Mother's Day, a film about three young women who go on a camping trip to a forest and are kidnapped and tortured by two mad brothers and their mother (played by Beatrice Pons). The film was banned for several years in some countries. As an actress, this was her only film. In 2007 & 2009 she directed, produced and wrote two short films, The Healing and Shadows and Light.

== Filmography ==
| Title | Year | Character | Crew | Notes |
|---|---|---|---|---|
| Mother's Day | 1980 | Abbey | – | – |
| The Healing | 2007 | – | Director, Producer, Exclusive Producer, Writer | 24 mins, Short Fantasy |
| Shadows and Light | 2009 | – | Director, Exclusive Producer, Writer | 13 mins, Short Drama, Black & White |
