= Mother's Day (2010 film) =

2010 film by Darren Lynn Bousman

- Official teaser poster
- Directed by: Darren Lynn Bousman
- Screenplay by: Scott Milam
- Story by: Scott Milam
- Based on: Mother's Day by Charles Kaufman; Warren Leight
- Produced by: Brett Ratner; Richard Saperstein; Jay Stern; Brian Witten
- Starring: Jaime King; Rebecca De Mornay; Patrick Flueger; Frank Grillo; Warren Kole; Briana Evigan; Deborah Ann Woll; Lisa Marcos; Matt O'Leary; Shawn Ashmore
- Cinematography: Joseph White
- Edited by: Hunter M. Via
- Music by: Bobby Johnston
- Production companies: The Genre Co.; Rat Entertainment; LightTower Entertainment
- Distributed by: Anchor Bay Films (North America); Sierra/Affinity (International)
- Release dates: September 23, 2010 (Fantastic Fest); May 4, 2012 (United States)
- Running time: 112 minutes
- Countries: United States; Canada
- Language: English
- Budget: $11 million
- Box office: $862,769

Mother's Day is a 2010 psychological horror film directed by Darren Lynn Bousman. It is a loose remake of Charles Kaufman's Mother's Day and was written by Scott Milam and produced by Brett Ratner. The film stars Rebecca De Mornay, Jaime King, Briana Evigan, Patrick Flueger, Deborah Ann Woll, Matt O'Leary, Jessie Rusu and Shawn Ashmore. It’s an international co-production film between the United States and Canada.

The film is about three brothers who fail to rob a bank then run to their mother so she can help them get away. The brothers discover that their mother has lost her house in a foreclosure. The brothers hold the new owners and their guests hostage. When their mother arrives, she takes control of the situation.

== Plot ==
An unknown woman enters a maternity ward and, with help from an accomplice, steals a newborn baby. Terry, one of the guards catches them in the act but ends up being stabbed to death.

Beth Sohapi is having a birthday party for her husband, Daniel Sohapi with the help of their friends, married couple Treshawn and Gina Jackson; Dave Lowe and his fiancee, Annette Langston; George Barnum and his girlfriend, Melissa McGuire; and Daniel's co worker, and friend, Julie Ross. The news reports a tornado is heading their way; Daniel assures his guests that the basement is tornado proof.

After a bank robbery gone wrong, three brothers, eldest and leader Ike, irrational and irresponsible Addley and Johnny, who has been badly injured, are on the run from the law. They reach their mother's house only to find it unrecognizable. Daniel and Beth, hearing noise upstairs, leave the basement party only to find the brothers holding them hostage within their home at gunpoint. Terrified, Beth offers the brothers the help of George, a doctor, who begins to tend to Johnny's injuries. Addley forces Beth and Daniel downstairs, trapping all the party-goers in the basement at gunpoint. Ike calls his sister Lydia, who informs him that she and their mother lost the house and will be on their way to help the boys.

A short time later, an RV arrives with Lydia and Mother with Lydia rushing to Johnny's side, showing she only has compassion for him. Mother becomes very angry at Ike for losing the emergency phone they use to contact one another, telling him she was unable to alert him of losing the house. Realizing the gravity of the situation, Mother arranges help to sneak over the border into Canada, however it will cost ten thousand dollars. She learns of her sons sending money to the house which she never received, before going into the basement. Mother is initially nice to the hostages, explaining to them that no one has to get hurt. She confronts Beth and Daniel about the money, however both deny knowing about it. Mother believes Beth, however she has Addley and Ike torture Daniel for information. Just then Melissa attempts to escape, only to be shot by Addley. Mother strikes Addley for his behavior then takes the cellphones, bank cards and pin numbers of the others and makes Ike take Beth to a cash machine to collect the money. Meanwhile, Mother informs George to keep Johnny alive, or they will all die, with Lydia told to help George and Johnny.

A police officer arrives after the three suspects of the bank robbery are identified as the old residents of the house, but Daniel makes him leave assuring him everything is fine, thus alerting Mother of Daniel's lying skills. She further becomes suspicious after Lydia discovers a Valentine's card from Daniel to Julie, as well as photographs and newspaper articles of a child killed in a car accident.

Ike and Beth dispose of Melissa's body behind a dumpster, where she is soon found to be alive by two sanitation workers who rush her to a hospital. While at the ATM, Beth and Ike encounter two party girls, Vicky Rice and Jenna Luther, who Ike quickly kills after they realize he has a gun. The pair travel to Treshawn's laundromat business to take money out of the safe, where Beth attempts to escape but fails, while later encountering the same police officer who Ike then kills. Back at the house, George realizes Mother has been lying to Lydia about a rare skin condition and tries to convince her to help his friends, but Mother sends Lydia away. Johnny, now in critical condition, has to be resuscitated by Lydia and George when he goes into cardiac arrest, telling his mother he doesn't want to die a virgin. Mother forces Treshawn and Dave to fight over which one of their partners will be forced to have sex with Johnny. Dave loses and Annette is forced upstairs. However Johnny's injuries prove too severe to rape Annette and she is forced back into the basement by Addley. Dave attacks Addley, resulting in Addley accidentally shooting Dave in the face, killing him. Gina takes the opportunity to try to escape, however is brought back to the house by Daniel in order to save Beth.

In the basement, Mother informs Gina that disobedience has consequences, before pouring boiling water over Treshawn. Mother then attempts to find her money by burning the photographs of the boy, revealed to be Daniel and Beth's deceased son. Mother then sets Julie's hair on fire, but extinguishes it when she realizes Daniel is telling the truth about the money. Mother leaves the basement, before the group manage to arm themselves with knives. They lure Addley into the basement and stab him to death. Treshawn, now deaf and having difficulty seeing, takes Addley's gun and goes upstairs. Gina follows him, startling him and causing him to shoot her in the side. As Treshawn attempts to help his wife, Mother shoots him in the back, killing him. Mother discovers Addley's body and phones Ike, before forcing Beth to listen to her shoot Daniel. Annette and Julie are then taken upstairs and tied up.

At the hospital, Melissa regains consciousness and alerts authorities to the house. George confronts Mother, telling her that none of her kids look like one another, and look nothing like her. Mother, enraged, threatens to kill him, but Lydia convinces her that they still need George to help Johnny. Ike and Beth then burst through the front door with the money, Ike heading downstairs to mourn his loss. Mother instructs Ike, Lydia and George to take Johnny to the RV while she has a chat with the ladies.

Inside the RV, Johnny, hoping to please his mother and older brother, shoots George in spite of Lydia's pleas to let him live. Mother reveals to Julie and Annette that Beth was the one who hid the money and is the one responsible for all the deaths. Beth reveals that she was hiding the money for the baby she is expecting. She also reveals she knew Daniel was cheating on her with Julie, and wanted to leave him. Mother forces Beth to take a pregnancy test to prove it, before Beth knocks Mother unconscious. Beth unties Julie - who is shot in the head by Ike while trying to escape the house - and Annette, who hides with Beth in the garage. They are overpowered by Ike, who then dies after a cabinet falls upon him. Annette escapes to the neighbours, while Beth fights with Mother in the house. Beth is knocked unconscious and Mother sets the house on fire. However, Beth wakes up and overpowers Mother, hitting her with a wooden chopping board, before escaping the house along with Gina, who has survived her injuries.

Months later, a very pregnant Beth goes into labor and is taken to the hospital by Annette, Gina and Melissa. That night, Beth wakes up to the emergency alarms going off in the maternity ward. She gets up and goes to check on her baby, but the bassinette is empty. The film ends with Lydia, Johnny and Mother leaving the country in the RV with Beth's baby.

== Cast ==
- Rebecca De Mornay as Natalie "Mother" Koffin, mother of Ike, Addley, Johnny, and Lydia. Controlling and very manipulative, she uses the hostages' personal problems to her advantage. It is strongly implied that she is not the biological mother of any of her children and none of them are related by blood.
- Jaime King as Beth Sohapi, the damaged wife of Daniel and main protagonist.
- Patrick Flueger as Izzak "Ike" Koffin, eldest son of Mother, whom naturally is alpha-male of the brothers.
- Frank Grillo as Daniel Sohapi, the unfaithful husband of Beth.
- Warren Kole as Addley Koffin, second son of Mother. He has problems controlling his anger and vents his frustrations via the hostages.
- Briana Evigan as Annette Langston, the younger girlfriend of Dave. Strong and independent, she is described by Mother as a "tough cookie".
- Deborah Ann Woll as Lydia Koffin, quiet and timid, she is the only daughter of Mother and closest only to Johnny.
- Lisa Marcos as Julie Ross, colleague of Daniel, who is also having an affair with him.
- Matt O'Leary as Jonathan "Johnny" Koffin, youngest son of Mother, who has been shot and injured in a bank robbery gone awry. Reluctantly loyal to his oldest brother and mother, only murdering others to appease them.
- Lyriq Bent as Treshawn Jackson, the husband of Gina.
- Tony Nappo as Dave Lowe, the older boyfriend of Annette.
- Kandyse McClure as Gina Jackson, wife of Treshawn.
- Shawn Ashmore as George Barnum, boyfriend of Melissa and a doctor. He revives Johnny after going into cardiac arrest and points out that Natalie "Mother" Koffin is likely to be a baby snatcher.
- Jessie Rusu as Melissa McGuire, a single mother, and girlfriend of George.
- J. Larose as Terry, a security guard who stumbles across the opening kidnapping.
- Alexa Vega as Jenna Luther, a party girl.
- A. J. Cook as Vicky Rice, a party girl.
- Mike O'Brien as Officer Skay, a police officer hunting the family.

== Production ==
Principal photography began on August 24, 2009, and wrapped on October 9. Filming took place in Manitoba and Winnipeg. Bousman said that the film will have a realistic gritty tone. The film is directed by Darren Lynn Bousman and produced by Rat Entertainment’s Brett Ratner and Jay Stern; Genre Co.’s Richard Saperstein and Brian Witten. The special effects were created by make-up FX artist Francois Dagenais, who formerly worked with Darren Lynn Bousman on the Saw franchise.

The two brothers, Charles and Lloyd Kaufman respectively, director and producer of the original Mother's Day have cameos. Filming of a post-bank robbery scene was interrupted by the Winnipeg Police Service, who were actually investigating a real-life robbery that occurred in the city earlier in the day. Alexa Vega had worked with the director in Repo! The Genetic Opera and J. Larose had been in several of Bousman's projects including Repo! The Genetic Opera, Saw III, Saw IV and the Fear Itself episode "New Year's Day". The film was finalizing the editing process in April 2010. The post-production was completed and the film was ready to begin screening to studios. Bousman stated at a The Devil's Carnival screening that a 20-minute scene, his favorite moment in the film, was cut because it did not flow with the rest of the film.

== Soundtrack ==
Mother's Day features both an original score and nine songs that play in the film, primarily at the housewarming birthday party for Daniel. These songs are as follows:

- "The Mountain" - Heartless Bastards
- "Follow Me Now" - Gleedsville
- "Let Me Know (I Have a Right)" - Gloria Gaynor
- "Animal" - Neon Trees
- "Barrel of Donkeys" - Killola
- "Do-Wacka-Do" - Roger Miller
- "Dead Girls Don't Say No" - Kung Fu Vampire
- "Gloom Uprising" - Don Cavalli
- "Better Than Yesterday" - Briana Evigan (plays during the end credits)

== Release ==
The film was planned for release on April 30, 2010, but in March, the date was revoked and the film had an unknown release date. Mother's Day was bought by Gigapix Releasing in September and planned to release theatrically in the first quarter of 2011. In 2012, the film was released in Chicago, New York and Los Angeles in selected theaters on May 4, with DVD and Blu-ray combo pack on May 8. The film features commentary with director Darren Lynn Bousman and actor Shawn Ashmore. Mother's Day was released into cinemas in the United Kingdom on the June 10, 2011.

== Reception ==
Mother's Day received mixed reviews, but De Mornay's performance received widespread praise. On Rotten Tomatoes, the film holds a 41% rotten rating, based on 44 reviews.

The film made the UK top 10 box office chart where it opened at number 9 following its release on June 10, 2011. The film grossed £94,385 ($155,003) from 79 sites.
