= Soccer Dog: European Cup =

- DVD cover
- Directed by: Sandy Tung
- Written by: John E. Deaver
- Produced by: John H. Brister
- Starring: Eric Don; Nick Moran; Jake Thomas; Lori Heuring; Scott Cleverdon; Orson Bean; Darren Reiher; Frank Simons
- Cinematography: Duane Manwiller
- Edited by: Chris Wong
- Music by: Steve Porcaro; Joseph Williams
- Distributed by: Columbia TriStar Home Video
- Release date: 2004
- Running time: 88 minutes
- Country: United States
- Language: English

Soccer Dog: European Cup is the 2004 feature film sequel to the film Soccer Dog: The Movie (1999), about a dog with an uncanny ability to play soccer.

== Premise ==
The plot is about the dog from the first film who has been reclaimed by his real owners and is taken to Europe to play in the championship, which he eventually wins.

== Cast ==
- Eric Don as Mickey
- Nick Moran as Bryan MacGreggor
- Jake Thomas as Zach Connolly
- Lori Heuring as Veronica Matthews
- Scott Cleverdon as Alex Foote
- Orson Bean as Mayor Milton Gallagher
- Darren Reiher as William Wallace
- Frank Simons as Dr. Oddlike
- Jack McGee as Knox
- Tony Collins as The Referee

== Reception ==
A critic from Common Sense Media rated the film 2/5 stars and wrote, "kids will laugh at the goofy antics of the soccer team and enjoy the scenes with the dog. They may not be able to understand the Scottish accents and haggis references, but they'll still have fun even if their parents are cringing". A critic from The Dove Foundation wrote, "it was a touching story of how a family comes in many different forms and that even parents can learn from their kids". Alex Morrison of ThatFilmGuy wrote, "If you like football or have ever heard a real Scottish accent you’d best avoid this. Otherwise, enjoy!"

== Home media ==
The headbutt scene was removed from the United Kingdom version for a PG rating.

== See also ==
- List of association football films
