= The Last Rescue =

- Release poster
- Directed by: Eric Colley
- Written by: Sean Gleaves; Hallie Shepherd
- Produced by: Eric Colley; Brett Cullen; Hallie Shepherd; Tino Struckmann
- Starring: Brett Cullen; Cody Kasch; Ryan Merriman; Elizabeth Rice; Gilles Marini; Johann Urb; Fred Griffith
- Cinematography: Bryant Jansen
- Edited by: Eric Colley; Paul Proios; Hallie Shepherd
- Music by: Jeffery Alan Jones
- Distributed by: Artist View Entertainment
- Release date: July 7, 2015
- Country: United States
- Language: English

The Last Rescue is a 2015 American war film directed by Eric Colley and starring Brett Cullen. During World War II, three American soldiers and two Army Corps nurses are stranded in enemy territory. They take a high-ranking German officer as hostage and attempt to plan their escape.

== Plot ==
Months after D-Day in northern France in the fall of 1944, there is a fire-fight between the Germans and Americans. Pvt. James Lewis sees his friend killed in the trench beside him. He freezes and does not return fire at the German soldier. As a result, Captain Becket is wounded and he labels Lewis a coward. Nurse 1st Lt. Vera Cornish orders nurse 2nd Lt. Nancy Bell off a transportation truck to assist in the surgery of Capt. Becket. German soldiers return and kill the doctor and capture the wounded Becket, Lewis, Lt. Maxwell and the two nurses. As the American POWs are moved, Paratrooper Griggs and Fisher rescue them. In the struggle Maxwell knifes a German guard. While planning their next move, an SS officer shoots and kills Fisher. Angered Griggs physically attacks and kills the German and SS-Obersturmfuhrer Dittrich surrenders himself to the Americans.

The group needs to reach their own lines and escape from the German forces who currently surround them. A single German soldier stops for lunch and prisoner Dittrich yells out to shoot them and Lewis yells drop your rifle. During the standoff, Becket shoots the German and once again Lewis does not use his gun. They come upon a French farmhouse and the owner Bruno Travert reluctantly grants them permission to stay in his barn. Lewis thinks the Captain must hate him and Maxwell assures him he is only trying to save his life. Lewis bonds with Nancy and Maxwell bonds with Vera.

The next day as Bruno and Vera get ready to go for supplies, two German SS officers come to inspect. Coward Lewis hides behind the door. The Germans are looking for strangers and thought Bruno lived alone. When the two soldiers see Nancy, Lewis shoots one and now they have a second German prisoner. Captain decides that they must die. Maxwell and Lewis take the prisoners into the forest. Graf begs for his life and Dittrich is silent. Lewis cannot shoot his man but you hear two shots in the woods. Nancy has a conversation with the Captain about killing. He says it is simple. If he does not kill the enemy, they will kill him. And the same in reverse.

As the four leave the farmhouse a truckload of Germans return looking for Americans. They execute Bruno but Vera is not seen. The four find an American tank and Maxwell makes radio contact but once again the four are captured. SS Officer Hesse decides Lewis must fight man to man their muscle man. He is badly beaten. They plan an escape. While hauling water, they overtake their guard. Lewis uses the German own guard's gun to shoot him and Maxwell takes the German's hand grenade and blows up the muscle man along with himself. Lewis then kills the munitions guard and controls the supplies. He sets bombs around the camp. SS Officer Hesse decrees that the POWs are now traitors and sentences them to death. Vera is brought out to be killed too. Lewis sets off the camp bombs and rescues his fellow Americans. As they depart in a jeep, Vera shoots Hesse herself.

They are free but as they approach the waiting Americans, their Jeep has a Nazi flag. Lewis waives the American flag his sister had given him for luck and they are welcomed and safe.

== Cast ==
- Brett Cullen as Captain Beckett
- Cody Kasch as Pvt. James Lewis
- Ryan Merriman as Paratrooper Griggs
- Elizabeth Rice as 2nd Lt. Nancy Bell
- Darren Keefe as Lt. Maxwell
- Hallie Shepherd as 1st Lt. Vera Cornish
- Tony Doupe as SS-Oberführer Hesse
- Tino Struckmann as SS-Obersturmführer Dittrich
- Fred Griffith as Doctor
- Gilles Marini as Bruno Travert
- Johann Urb as Feldgendarm Hans Graf
- Daniel Magill as Paratrooper Fisher
- Eric Colley as Lt. Bill Nelson
