= Darren Reiher =

American actor (born 1975)

Darren Keefe
- Born: Darren Keefe Reiher; July 4, 1975 (age 51); Portadown, Northern Ireland, UK
- Occupations: Actor, Carpenter
- Years active: 1999–present

Darren Keefe (born Darren Keefe Reiher, 4 July 1975) is an American actor. He was born in Portadown, Northern Ireland.

== Career ==
He moved to Los Angeles in 1998 from Ireland. Reiher has appeared in television shows such as Lost, Private Practice, Rodney, and Summerland, as well as in the movies Soccer Dog: European Cup, My Big Fat Independent Movie, Hatchetman and Truth about Kerry. He had also written and produced his own series, Subs, which won a "Make Your Own Pilot" contest with the FX Network.

When not being an actor, he is also a carpenter, working on re-models of houses and designing his own wood work projects. In 2020, he is starring on the HGTV television show Extreme Makeover: Home Edition.

== Filmography ==
Year	Film	Role	Other notes
1999	Uninvited Guest	Waiter #1	billed as Darren Reiher
2002	Slaughter Studios	Chad Daniels	(Video), billed as Darren Reiher
2003	Hatchetman	Curtis Moore	(Video)
2003	Last Stand	Pvt. Wilkins	(Short), billed as Darren Reiher
2003	In Hot Pursuit	Richard Cooke	(Short), billed as Darren Reiher
2004	Soccer Dog: European Cup	William Wallace	
2005	My Big Fat Independent Movie	Johnny Vince	billed as Darren Reiher
2005	Secret Santa Deluxe	Chad	(Short), billed as Darren Reiher
2005	South of the Boulevard	Franklin Strong	(Short), billed as Darren Reiher
2009	Ochophobia (Fear of Vehicles)	Boyfriend	(Short), billed as Darren Reiher
2009	Circle of Eight	Fireman #1	billed as Darren Keefe
2010	Truth About Kerry	Patrick	billed as Darren Keefe
2010	December Six	Charlie	(Short), billed as Darren Keefe
2011	Walk a Mile in My Pradas	Danny	billed as Darren Keefe
2011	Karmalized	Malcolm	(Short), billed as Darren Keefe
2012	Plain Jane Escorts	Josh	(Short), billed as Darren Keefe
2014	Solitude	Man	(Short), billed as Darren Keefe
2015	The Last Rescue	Lt. Maxwell	billed as Darren Keefe
2017	Aggregate	Jim	billed as Darren Keefe
2018	Lemonheads	Neal	billed as Darren Keefe
2018	Two Pictures	Lou	
2019	Finding Steve McQueen	Deputy Hurlbuck	
2019	Philophobia: or the Fear of Falling in Love	Travis	
2019	Tubby Hook	Kieran Doyle	(Short),(completed)
Year	Television series	Role	Other notes
2003	Miss Match	Rick	TV series, 2 episodes
2005	Rodney	Sal	TV series, 1 episode
2005	Summerland	Photographer	TV series, 1 episode
2007	Subs	Coach Darius Farnsworth	(TV movie), billed as Darren Keefe
2007	Private Practice	Mark	TV series, 1 episode
2007	Heroes	Tire Iron	TV series, 1 episode, billed as Darren Keefe
2008	Lost	Billy	TV series, 1 episode, billed as Darren Keefe
2009	Dark Blue	Truck Driver	TV series, 1 episode, billed as Darren Keefe
2009	24	Marine Squad Leader	TV series, 1 episode, billed as Darren Keefe
2009	Chuck	Yeager	TV series, 1 episode, billed as Darren Keefe
2009	Without a Trace	Mitch Donnelly	TV series, 1 episode, billed as Darren Keefe
2009	Rules of the League	Joel Ballard	TV series, 1 episode, billed as Darren Keefe
2010	Sons of Anarchy	Scrum	TV series, 1 episode, billed as Darren Keefe
2010	Lie to Me	Jack	TV series, 1 episode, billed as Darren Keefe
2010	NCIS	Steven Baker	TV series, 1 episode, billed as Darren Keefe
2012	Bush-League	Homeless Man	TV series, 1 episode, billed as Darren Keefe
2017	Feud: Bette and Joan	Anthony Harvey	TV series, 1 episode
Unreleased	Pendragon	Jude Pendragon (also King Arthur)	TV series, billed as Darren Keefe
