= Forever, Lulu (1987 film) =

1987 West German film

- Theatrical release poster
- Directed by: Amos Kollek
- Written by: Amos Kollek
- Produced by: Amos Kollek; Dieter Geissler; Claus Hardt
- Starring: Hanna Schygulla; Deborah Harry; Alec Baldwin; Paul Gleason; Annie Golden
- Cinematography: Lisa Renzler
- Edited by: Jay Freund
- Music by: Paul Chihara
- Distributed by: Tri-Star Pictures
- Release dates: November 13, 1986 (Germany); April 24, 1987 (U.S.)
- Running time: 85 minutes
- Countries: West Germany; United States
- Language: English
- Budget: $3 million
- Box office: $36,786

Forever, Lulu (also known as Crazy Streets) is a 1987 West German-American comedy-mystery film directed by Amos Kollek, and starring Hanna Schygulla, Deborah Harry, Wayne Knight and Alec Baldwin in his film debut. The film features sex therapist Ruth Westheimer. It was the final film starring Beatrice Pons and R. L. Ryan.

In the film, a German woman works as a secretary in New York City, while trying to publish her novel. Within a few days, she is fired from her job, her manuscript is rejected, and she has a disastrous blind date. She has a mental breakdown and randomly waves a gun in the air. She is mistaken for a mugger, and a couple hands over their coats to her. The coats contain a signed photograph of a recent female acquaintance of the writer, and the writer unwittingly gets involved in a criminal case connected to this mystery woman.

== Plot ==
The film centers on a German woman, Elaine Hines, living in New York City with aspirations of becoming a novelist. Reality settles in when Elaine loses her secretary job at a toilet seat company. Her agent calls her manuscript unsellable and not sexy enough before dropping her as a client.

As if life couldn't get more unbearable for Elaine, her unexpected blind date turns disastrous. She runs out in the rain, waving a gun in the air in a mental breakdown. A couple sees her in the rain, assuming she has some violent tendencies. Afraid for their lives, they give Elaine their coats. Inside one of the coats' pockets is a picture of a blonde woman she previously encountered, signed "Forever, Lulu" and an address. From this point, Elaine's life takes a crazy turn that involves gangsters, money, drugs, a handsome cop and the mystery blonde in the photograph.

== Cast ==
- Hanna Schygulla as Elaine
- Debbie Harry as Lulu
- Alec Baldwin as Buck
- Annie Golden as Diana
- Paul Gleason as Robert
- Ruth Westheimer as Dr. Ruth Westheimer (herself)
- Raymond Serra as Alphonse
- George Kyle as Pepe
- Harold Guskin as Archie
- Bill Corsair as Blackmailer
- Jonathan Freeman as Don
- Amos Kollek as Larry
- Charles Ludlam as Harvey
- Kathleen Gati as Lisa
- Beatrice Pons as Fortune Teller
- Sally-Jane Heit as Martha
- Helen Lloyd Breed as Landlady
- Justine Johnston as Judith Cabot
- Susan Blommaert as Jackie Coles
- Kenny Marino as Detective Calhoun
- Joanne Carlo as Donna
- Wayne Knight as Stevie

== Box office information ==
According to Box Office Mojo, Forever, Lulu grossed $36,786 in its brief North American theatrical run.

== Home media ==
RCA/Columbia Pictures Home Video released Forever, Lulu on VHS in late 1987. Sony Pictures Home Entertainment (successor to RCA/Columbia Pictures Home Video) officially released this on DVD in 2005. It was released by other home entertainment distributors under the alternate title, Crazy Streets. Some DVD copies portrayed either Alec Baldwin or Deborah Harry on the cover, even though they are featured in supporting roles.
