= Deposit return scheme (Scotland) =

Planned Scottish container return scheme

The deposit return scheme (DRS), is a container return scheme being planned for Scotland. The scheme, initially slated for a 2022 launch, has been delayed several times and is now due to start in October 2027 to coincide with other schemes in the United Kingdom.

Similar schemes have been adopted across Europe, notably in Germany and nearby Ireland.

== Background ==
The Scottish Government proposed a DRS in 2017 which would recycle single use containers made of PET plastic and aluminium to reduce litter and address environmental concerns. In May 2019, the Environment Secretary Roseanna Cunningham announced that the scheme would also include glass and that the deposit has been confirmed at a flat 20p; glass was subsequently removed from the scheme's scope (see § Controversy). All shops that sell drinks and also all producers would be required to accept all returned containers and pay deposits back to the consumer. The scheme was initially to be administered by a not-for-profit limited company called Circularity Scotland Ltd, which subsequently went into administration. The scheme is now administered by UK Deposit Management Organisation Limited, trading as Exchange for Change, which was designated as scheme administrator following the Deposit and Return Scheme for Scotland Amendment Regulations 2025, approved by the Scottish Parliament on 18 June 2025.

After initially being delayed because of the COVID-19 pandemic, implementation of the scheme came under the remit of the office of Minister for Green Skills, Circular Economy and Biodiversity Lorna Slater in August 2021. In November of that year, Slater announced a second delay so she could continue to work with producers to "agree a final timescale and clear milestones for delivery".

In June 2025, Scotland's DRS legislation was amended to align with the framework for England and Northern Ireland, designating Exchange for Change (the trading name of UK Deposit Management Organisation Limited) as scheme administrator, with all nations aligned on a launch date of 1 October 2027; Exchange for Change has confirmed that glass will not be included in the scheme.

== Proposed scheme provisions ==
The scheme would operate along the "producer pays" principle, where the producer pays deposit amount (20p) to the scheme operator, Circularity Scotland. At each point down the chain, the wholesaler, the retailer, and ultimately the consumer who buy the goods each pay the unit price plus the deposit. Every producer and retailer would also operate a return point, where the consumer would return the container and receive back the deposit. The return point operator would then request back the deposit from Circularity Scotland.

Producers would pay a small surcharge to cover the cost of the scheme and retailers would receive a small handling fee to cover their costs. Each product would need a specific barcode to track returns. All producers and retailers of drinks in bottles and cans in Scotland would need to sign up to the scheme to continue selling. When a container is not returned, then VAT would be due on the deposit with the liability falling on the producer.

The scheme aimed to increase recycling of used containers to 90% by the second year, and reduce carbon emissions by 4 million tonnes over 25 years. The Scottish Government estimated that 42,000 fewer plastic bottles would be littered every day in Scotland. The direct costs saved by spending less on cleaning up litter would be £46 million. Including glass would have reduced CO_{2} emissions by 50,000 tonnes per year.

== Controversy ==
Critics argued the scheme would put undue pressure on small retailers as many would not have the staff nor the space to handle returned containers. Automated Reverse Vending Machines cost circa £30,000 with £2,000 for installation. The Scottish Retail Consortium criticised the requirement for those selling drinks online to collect empty containers from customers, as they would be unable to use their existing vehicles to collect empty drinks cans and bottles due to food safety risks.

A Scottish Government report in March 2023 stated there where major risks in key areas of the scheme. The report gave a "red/amber" status to the scheme, meaning it doubted that it could be delivered successfully.

The UK Government said the scheme would create a barrier on trade within the United Kingdom and that it would require an exemption from the United Kingdom Internal Market Act 2020. However, the UK Government granted an exemption, allowing the Scottish Government to proceed with the scheme provided they removed glass. This was due to the UK Government's own planned scheme not including glass and having glass in the Scottish scheme would create a "permanent divergence" within the UK internal market. Despite the removal of glass the chief executive of Circularity Scotland Ltd, David Harris, said the scheme remained "viable" and the impact was "minimal", with drinks producers urging the Scottish Government to push on with the scheme. Scottish Ministers accused the UK Government of sabotage, showing an "utter disregard for devolution" and announced a delay to 2025 to coincide with the proposed UK-wide scheme. Following the announcement of the delay, major drinks firms including the producers of Irn-Bru, Red Bull and Coca-Cola pulled their financial support for Circularity Scotland Ltd citing "ongoing political uncertainty". Circularity Scotland Ltd subsequently went into administration with the loss of 60 jobs.

Michael Topham, Biffa's chief executive said the company had invested £65 million in the scheme "in good faith" and that they would look to recover this investment over the coming decade. In May 2024, it was confirmed that Biffa had lodged a claim for compensation from the Scottish Government at the Court of Session and named the former Circular Economy Minister Slater in the action.

A not-for-profit, publicly owned company, Circularity Scotland Ltd, was set up to operate the scheme however, it went into administration following the latest delay of the scheme. The total level of investment lost as a result of the delay is estimated at £300 million including £9 million of public money which had been invested via the Scottish National Investment Bank.

== See also ==
- Circular economy
- Minister for Green Skills, Circular Economy and Biodiversity
- Scottish Government
- Product stewardship
- Reverse vending machine
- Waste management
- Deposit Return Scheme (Ireland)
