= Riverside Cemetery (Saddle Brook, New Jersey) =

Jewish cemetery in Bergen County, New Jersey

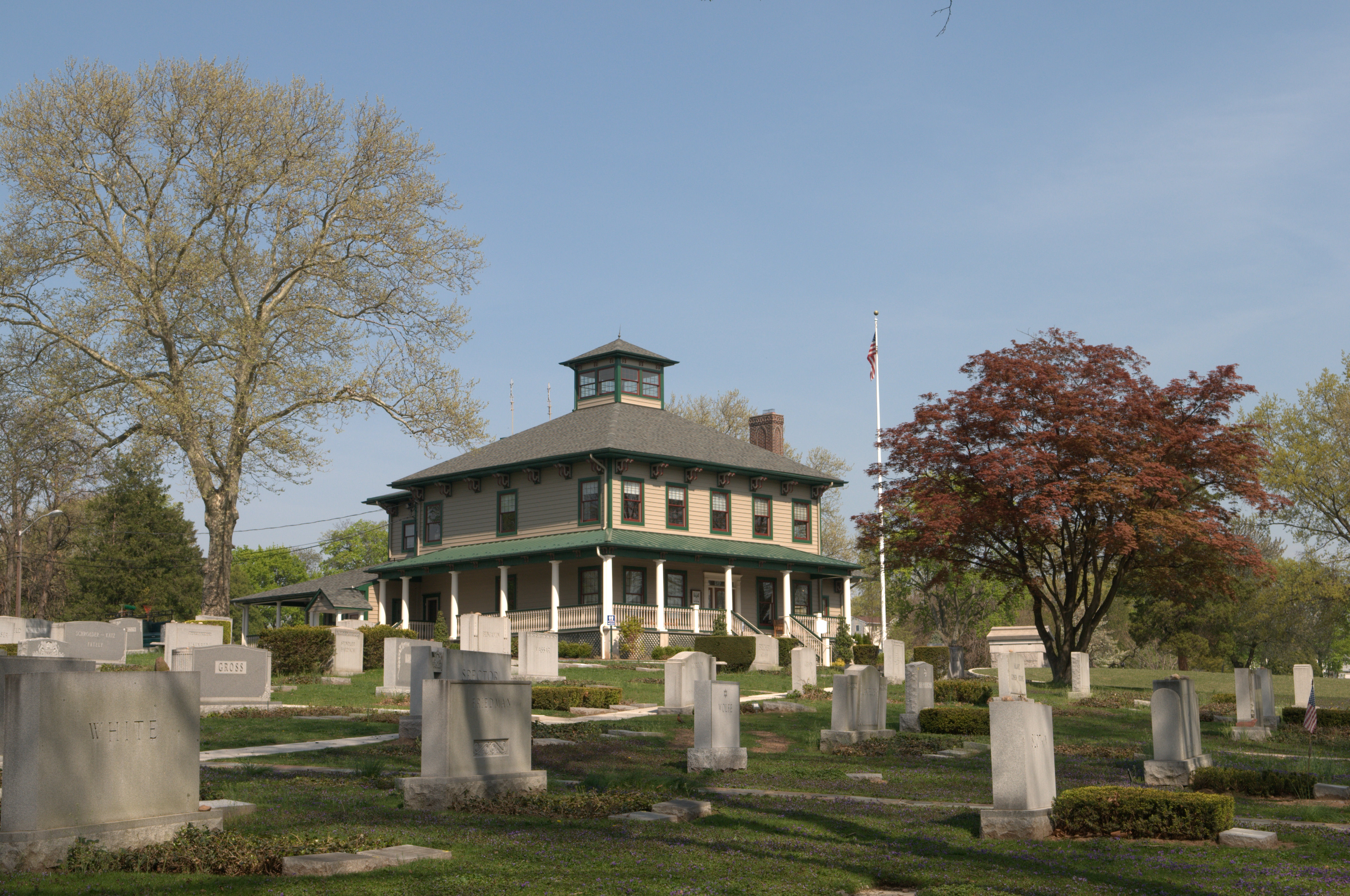
- Interactive map of Riverside Cemetery

Details
- Established: 1906
- Location: Saddle Brook, New Jersey
- Country: United States
- Coordinates: 40°53′35″N 74°04′54″W
- Type: Private
- Owned by: Lakewood Cemetery Association
- No. of graves: >65,000
- Website: www.riversidecemetery.org
- Find a Grave: Riverside Cemetery
- The Political Graveyard: Riverside Cemetery

Riverside Cemetery is a plot-holder owned Jewish cemetery located in Saddle Brook, New Jersey, located 9 miles (14 km) west of the George Washington Bridge. The cemetery maintains over 25,000 individual plantings on graves throughout the property, with over 65,000 burials.

Prior to becoming a cemetery, the land was the property of Richard Romaine. Bergen County Historical Society maps indicate a main house of early Italianate design (current office), a grist mill and a saw mill on the property (the mills were removed prior to establishment of the cemetery).

== Notable burials ==
- Meyer Berger (1898–1959), journalist
- Abraham Jacob Bogdanove (1886–1946), painter, educator
- Moshe Cotel (1943–2008), composer
- Ervin Drake (1919–2015), songwriter
- Stanley Milgram (1933–1984), scientist
- Beatrice Pons (1906–1991), actress
- Isidor Isaac Rabi (1898–1988), nuclear physicist, nobel prize in physics recipient
- Benjamin J. Rabin (1896–1969), U.S. congressman
- Phil Rubenstein (1940–1992), actor
