= Fred Griffith (actor) =

American actor and producer (born 1964)

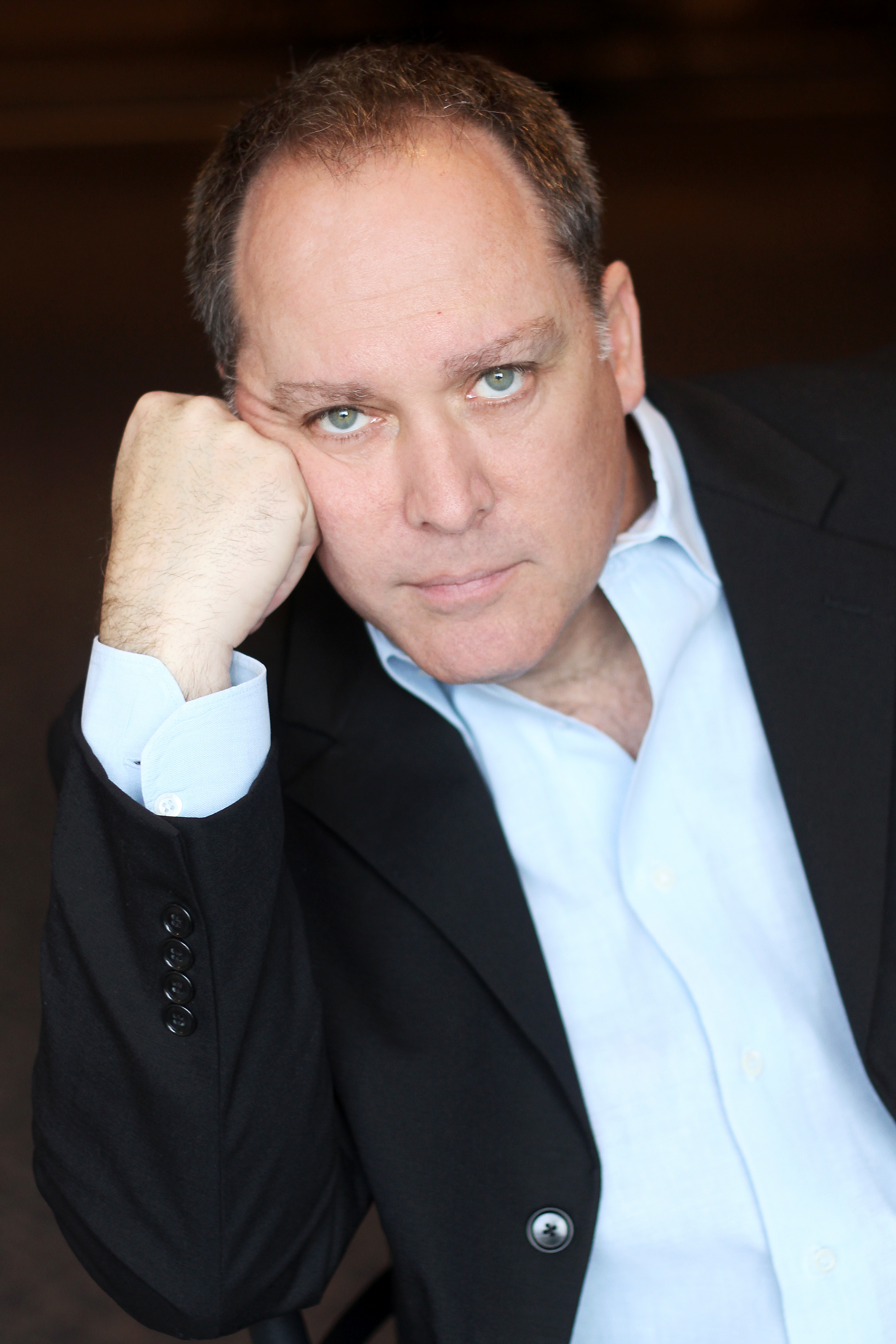
- Born: Freddy Merrill Griffith; October 1, 1964 (age 61); Spartanburg, South Carolina
- Occupations: Actor, producer
- Spouses: Jennifer Rogers (m. 1999; div. 2009) Robin Johnson (m. 2012)
- Children: 2
- Website: www.fredgriffith.com

Fred Griffith (born October 1, 1964) is an American actor and producer.

== Early life ==
Griffith was born Freddy Merrill Griffith, the son of Victor Merrill Griffith and Linda Gayle Griffith, in Spartanburg, SC. Griffith is of Welsh and Scots-Irish ancestry. His ancestors fought in the American Revolutionary War, The Civil War in the United States, World War I, World War II, Korean War, and Vietnam War. He has a younger sister, Cynthia Lynn. From an early age he knew he wanted to be an entertainer. He studied at University of South Carolina, Spartanburg and Coastal Carolina. He waited to pursue his life's passion of being a professional actor until he was in his thirties.

== Career ==
He has been fortunate enough to work alongside of some of his childhood heroes, such as Robert Duvall in Gods and Generals and David Carradine in Miracle at Creek. He earned his SAG card in 2002 while working on Gods and Generals. The first film he produced was a short entitled Alex and it was nominated for an award at the Myrtle Beach Film Festival for "Best Ensemble". In 2004 he formed Follow Your Dreams Productions, a film production company. Also in 2004 he presented the Elvis Presley Award to the country music group Lonestar for their song "I'm Already There" on the American Veteran Awards show on The History Channel. Although he has never served in the United States Military he was told by a five star General that tonight he was serving his country by supporting them.

== Filmography ==
Year	Title	Role	Notes
2002	Expedition: Bismarck	Burkard von Müllenheim-Rechberg	(uncredited) Direct and Produced by James Cameron
2003	Gods and Generals	Brig. General Robert E. Rodes	
2005	Alex	Richard	Also Producer
2005	The Last Confederate: The Story of Robert Adams	Ellison Capers	
2005	Blood Deep	Victor Westen	
2005	Miracle at Sage Creek	Daniel	AKA Christmas Miracle At Sage Creek
2007	Ghost Town: The Movie	Whiskey Walters	Also Producer
2008	War of the Worlds 2: The Next Wave	Major Krammer	Re-edited for the Sci Fi Channel - TV Movie
2008	Fireline	Trace	Directed and Written by Chris Mulkey
2009	The Book of Ruth: Journey of Faith	Mahlon	
2009	Shadowheart	Marshall	
2010	Deadly Renovations	Justin	
2010	L.A. Ricochet	Fence	
2013	A Box For Rob	Chief Kyle Potter	
2013	The Ultimate Life	Myron Dudley	Sequel to The Ultimate Gift
2013	Prisoners	Groggy Man	scenes deleted, can be seen on the directors cut
2014	Homecoming	Victor Westen	Follow up to Blood Deep
2014	Hero	Bill Dawson	
2015	The Last Rescue	Doctor	

== Television ==
List of television credits
Year	Title	Role	Notes
2001	The Last Brickmaker in America	Teacher	CBS Movie of the Week
2003	The District	Union Captain	1 Episode
2004	Judging Amy	Radiologist	1 Episode
2004	24 (TV Series)	Doctor	
2012	A Smile as Big as the Moon	Judge	ABC Hallmark Movie of the Week

== Producer ==
List of film credits
Year	Film title	Notes
2005	Alex	
2007	Ghost Town: The Movie	
