= Mother's Day (1980 film) =

1980 American rape and revenge slasher film by Charles Kaufman

- Theatrical release poster
- Directed by: Charles Kaufman
- Written by: Charles Kaufman; Warren Leight
- Produced by: Michael Herz; Charles Kaufman
- Starring: Nancy Hendrickson; Deborah Luce; Tiana Pierce; Gary Pollard; Michael McCleery; Beatrice Pons
- Cinematography: Joseph Mangine
- Edited by: Daniel Loewenthal
- Music by: Phil Gallo; Clem Vicari, Jr.
- Production companies: Duty Productions; Saga Films A.B.
- Distributed by: United Film Distribution Company
- Release date: September 19, 1980
- Running time: 91 minutes
- Country: United States
- Language: English
- Budget: $115,000

Mother's Day is a 1980 American rape and revenge slasher film directed, co-written and produced by Charles Kaufman, brother of Troma Entertainment co-founder Lloyd Kaufman (who acted as an associate producer of the film). The plot focuses on three women on a camping excursion who fall victim to two deranged, murderous young men and their unhinged mother. The film contains elements of the satire, thriller and slasher genres.

Upon its release, Mother's Day received criticism for its depiction of violence and rape, and was banned in the UK by the BBFC. While it was not a success at the time of its release and received negative critical reception, the film has since developed a cult following. It has also been the subject of critical analysis by film scholars for its subtextual commentary on consumerism and the proliferation of TV in popular culture. A loose remake of the same name was released in 2010.

== Plot ==
During a Growth Opportunity graduation (a parody of Erhard Seminars Training), a couple, Terry and Charlie, are offered a ride by an old woman and driven into the woods. After the old woman's car stalls, two inbred killers appear and attack; Charlie is decapitated with a machete in the backseat while Terry is brutally beaten up before being garroted by the old lady. It is revealed that the two killers named Ike and Addley are the woman's sons.

Meanwhile, three women who have been friends since college—Trina, Abbey, and Jackie—prepare for an annual "mystery weekend" trip, during which one of them arranges a getaway to a location unknown to the other two. Jackie, who lives in NYC, has planned a camping trip for them in the Deep Barrens, a forested area in rural New Jersey. Trina, a glamorous model living in L.A., and Abbey, who returned to Chicago after college to care for her ailing mother, travel to New Jersey, where Jackie picks them up. After stopping at a nearby store for supplies, they arrive at their destination and begin to camp.

While in the woods, they begin to explore, sitting around the campfire, telling stories, and having fun swimming and fishing. Unbeknownst to them, they are being stalked by Ike and Addley. In the middle of the night, Ike and Addley attack the women, binding and gagging them. The three are taken by Ike and Addley to a ramshackle home in the woods where they live with their unhinged mother, whom they impress by torturing people. The brothers tie the women to exercise equipment inside the home, but Jackie is swiftly selected by Mother to be the brothers' first victim and is taken outside. Addley rapes Jackie while Ike photographs it, and Mother looks on encouragingly.

Abbey and Trina awaken the following day and plan to escape while Mother and her boys exercise outside. During their exercise routine, Mother is alarmed when she spots her deformed sister Queenie—who lives in the woods and subsists on vermin—roaming in the distance. Inside the house, Abbey and Trina discover Terry and Charlie's bodies, and find a brutalized Jackie hidden inside a drawer. The three women manage to escape and flee into the woods. While Ike searches for the women, Addley remains at home with Mother, where he questions Queenie's existence and whether Mother's claims are just a ploy to keep the boys at home with her. As Jackie is unable to move quickly because of her injuries, Trina and Abbey become separated. Trina finds the car destroyed and is chased by Ike, while Jackie peacefully dies of her wounds. Ike eventually loses track of Trina, and she reunites with Abbey for revenge against Mother and the brothers.

The next morning, Abbey and Trina arm themselves and invade the cabin to avenge Jackie. Trina castrates Addley with a clawhammer before Abbey suffocates him. When the women drag Addley's body outside, Ike leaps from a second-story window and attacks them. Enraged over his brother's death, Ike tries to strangle Trina before Abbey pours Drano down his throat. He chases the women into the house, where Abbey slams a television set on his head before Trina stabs him to death with an electric knife. With the brothers dead, the girls confront Mother in the basement where she is watching television, and sadistically suffocate her with a pair of inflatable breasts. With their vengeance complete, the two girls hold a burial for Jackie and prepare to leave the woods when Queenie suddenly leaps at them from behind the bushes.

== Cast ==
- Nancy Hendrickson as Abbey
- Deborah Luce as Jackie
- Tiana Pierce as Trina
- Beatrice Pons as Mother (credited as Rose Ross)
- Gary Pollard as Ike (credited as Holden McGuire)
- Michael McCleery as Addley (credited as Billy Ray McQuade)
- Bobby Collins as Ernie (credited as Robert Collins)
- Peter Fox as Brad 'Dobber' Dobson (credited as Karl Sandys)

== Analysis and themes ==
Film scholar John Kenneth Muir, though dismissive of the film, notes that it is considered "a satire of our TV society, since the film is littered with references to pop culture. For instance, you'll see the U.S.S. Enterprise, a Batman action figure, Ernie (of Bert and Ernie of Sesame Street), G.I. Joe, and even King Kong. You'll see Trix cereal, and a death by a television set".

Writer Scott Aaron Stine stated in his book The Gorehound's Guide to Splatter Films of the 1980s, that the film "makes pointed stabs at consumerism, pop psychology, TV culture, parental expectations, and even the gratuitous excesses of the '70s". Critic Phil Hardy has similarly noted: "As satire, Mother's Day works rather well, opening with a knock at encounter groups... and moving on to make a swipe at American motherhood. The film ends as a gross parody of consumerism, with McGuire and McQuade eating junk cereals by the bucketful, endlessly arguing whether punk is better than disco, collecting Sesame Street and Star Trek merchandising and raping and killing, 'just like I seen on TV'".

== Release ==
Mother's Day first opened in the U.S. on September 19, 1980, playing on 90 screens in the NYC metropolitan area. It continued to screen in various U.S. cities throughout the remainder of the year, opening in Tucson on November 7, and L.A. on November 14.

In the UK, the BBFC rejected the film in 1980, banning it from distribution. The film was shown several times on the Horror Channel between 2005 and 2008, with no cuts but it was not passed for release on home media until 2015, when it passed uncut with an 18 certificate.

In Australia, the film was originally passed uncut with an R 18+ rating by the ACB in 1983, but was later banned upon review in 1985.

The role of Ike was erroneously credited to actor Frederick Coffin on various internet sites for years. It was confirmed on Vinegar Syndrome's 2023 4K UHD/Blu-ray release by actor Michael McCleery (Addley) that the actor's true identity was Gary Pollard. He has allegedly died.

=== Home media ===
Mother's Day received a VHS release in 1983 by Media Home Entertainment, and later by Video Treasures in 1988. It was released on DVD on October 31, 2000, by Troma Entertainment.

A new DVD and Blu-ray was released September 4, 2012 by Anchor Bay Entertainment. The film was released for the first time in the United Kingdom as Number 02 of 88 Films "Slasher's Classics Collection" series on Blu-ray on February 23, 2015.

Vinegar Syndrome released a 4K UHD/Blu-ray of the movie in October 2023. This release featured a brand new restoration from the original camera negative. Bonus features included hours of new interviews with the cast and crew, as well as a tour of the filming locations. The bonus features from the previous Anchor Bay Entertainment version were also included. A Blu-ray signing was held at Forbidden Planet (retail chain) in New York City on November 12, 2023, with several of the film's cast/crew in attendance.

== Reception ==
Mother's Day received significant criticism for its depiction of violence, particularly violence against women. Kevin Thomas of the L.A. Times wrote: "Any traces of talent and dark humor that might show through Mother's Day are drowned by the cynicism and horrendousness of the entire enterprise". Roger Ebert famously despised the film, giving it 0/4 stars in a review and saying how disgusted he was at its violence, gore, rape and torture during "Sneak Previews", writing "the question of why anyone of any age would possibly want to see this movie remains without an answer". Ted Serrill of The Central New Jersey Home News criticized the "cartoonish acting and awkward camera set-ups", as well as its failure "to generate terror, much less suspense". Catherine Chapin of The Charlotte Observer panned the film for its violent content, writing that it "makes censorship seem like a good idea", and that it "has no socially redeeming warning message".

In the Detroit Free Press, Jack Mathews encapsulated: "How much space should a newspaper devote to a review of a film such as Mother's Day, a repulsively graphic and vile story about a pair of retarded backwoods brothers who drag young women home to rape and bat around for the pleasure of their demented, sadistic mother? As little as possible". Tom Sullivan of The Herald-News panned the film, deeming it "just plain sick. And not especially entertaining, even at its better moments", while Ernest LeoGrande of the Daily News expressed a similar sentiment, giving the film a zero-star rating and writing: "The day homicidal rape becomes funny, Mother's Day may be considered a comedy. For the meantime, director Charles Kaufman has perverted his obvious sense of the ridiculous to pander to the audience for pornographic violence".

On the internet review aggregator Rotten Tomatoes, the film holds a 46% approval rating, based on 13 reviews, with an average rating of 4.8/10. On Metacritic, the film has a weighted average score of 1 out of 100, based on 4 critics, indicating "overwhelming dislike".

== Remake ==
A remake Mother's Day directed by Darren Lynn Bousman and produced by Brett Ratner was released at Fantastic Fest in September 2010 and in the United Kingdom in June 2011. The film received several pushbacks, but was released on DVD and Blu-ray on March 8, 2012.

== Bibliography ==
- Hardy, Phil, ed. (1985). The Aurum Film Encyclopedia: Horror. Vol. 3. London: Aurum Press. ISBN 978-0-948-14904-7.
- Muir, John Kenneth (2012). Horror Films of the 1980s. Jefferson, North Carolina: McFarland. ISBN 978-0-786-47298-7.
- Stine, Scott Aaron (2003). The Gorehound's Guide to Splatter Films of the 1980s. Jefferson, North Carolina: McFarland. ISBN 978-1-476-61132-7.
