= Beatrice Pons =

American actress (1906-1991)

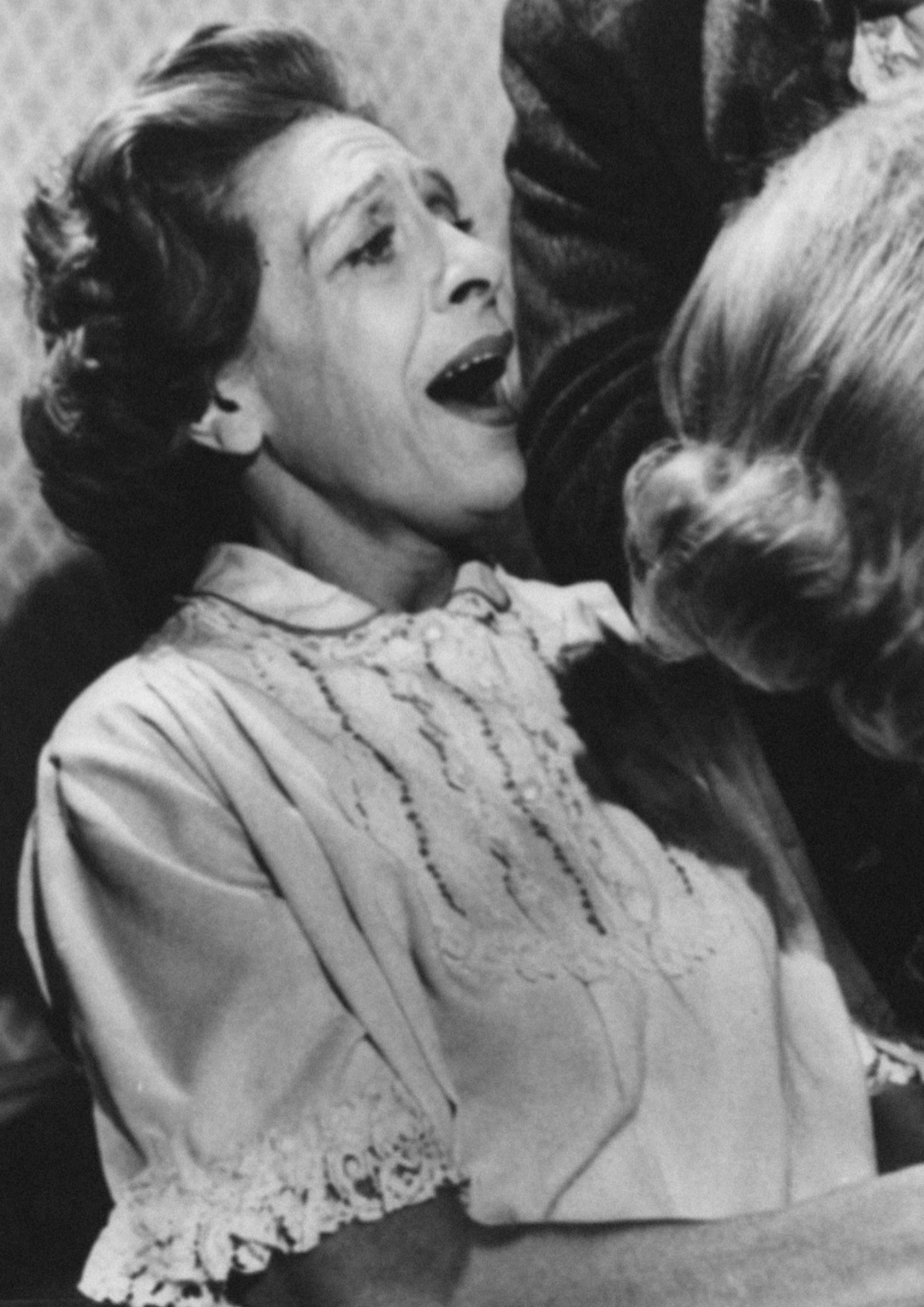
- Pons in Car 54, Where Are You?, 1963
- Born: Beatrice Posner; January 28, 1906; Rhode Island, US
- Died: June 17, 1991 (aged 85); New York City, US
- Resting place: Riverside Cemetery, Saddle Brook, New Jersey
- Other name: Rose Ross
- Occupation: Actress
- Years active: 1934–1987
- Spouse: David Ross (m. 1934; died 1975)
- Children: 1

Beatrice Pons (née Posner; January 28, 1906 – June 17, 1991) was an American stage, radio, television and film character actress. She is best known for her recurring television roles on The Phil Silvers Show and Car 54, Where Are You? She appeared as "Mother" in the independent horror film Mother's Day under the name Rose Ross.

== Life and career ==
Trained as a teacher, Pons began working in chorus and minor roles on Broadway in 1934. She also had a nightclub act doing impressions of famous actresses, comedians and singers. In the mid-1930s, she found work on radio, including the Dick Tracy series starting in January 1938.

Pons' first television appearance was on the NBC anthology series Goodyear Television Playhouse. She may be best-remembered for her recurring roles as Mrs. Emma Ritzik on the television sitcom The Phil Silvers Show and as Lucille Toody on the sitcom Car 54, Where Are You?, with her husband in both series played by veteran comedic actor Joe E. Ross. She also made appearances on the long-running American radio-turned-television series The Goldbergs, The United States Steel Hour, and the CBS prime time drama The Nurses.

In her later years, Pons began appearing in films. In 1964 she made her film debut in the comedy Diary of a Bachelor. In 1980 she played the role of "Mother" in the cult horror film Mother's Day, in which she chose to be credited as Rose Ross (her real-life husband's surname was Ross). Her later film credits include Rachel, Rachel and Forever, Lulu.

== Personal life and death ==
Pons was married to radio personality David Ross (born David Rosenthal; July 7, 1891 – died November 12, 1975), by whom she had a son, Jonathan.

Pons died on June 17, 1991, aged 85, in New York City. She was buried in Riverside Cemetery, Saddle Brook, New Jersey.

== Filmography ==
=== Film ===
Year	Title	Role	Notes
1964	Diary of a Bachelor	Bachelorette	Film debut
1965	Le gendarme à New York	La standardiste	Uncredited role
1968	Rachel, Rachel	Florence	
1980	Mother's Day	Mother	Credited as Rose Ross
1984	Rent Control	Leonard's Mother	
1987	Forever, Lulu	Fortune Teller	

=== Television ===
Year	Title	Role	Notes
1951	Big Town	Unnamed/unknown role	Season 1 (guest role; 1 episode)
1952	Goodyear Television Playhouse	Unnamed/unknown role	Season 1 (guest role; 1 episode)
1955	Danger	Unnamed/unknown role	Season 1 (guest role; 1 episode)
1954–56	The Goldbergs	Bella/Head Nurse	Two separate guest roles (2 episodes)
1958	The United States Steel Hour	Danka	Season 5 (guest role; 1 episode)
1956–59	The Phil Silvers Show	Mrs. Emma Ritzik	Seasons 2–4 (recurring role; 14 episodes)
1959	Keep in Step	Mrs. Emma Ritzik	The Phil Silvers Pontiac Special
1960	Deadline	Nurse	Season 1 (guest role; 1 episode)
1961–63	Car 54, Where Are You?	Lucille Toody	Seasons 1–2 (main role; 32 episodes)
1964	The Nurses	Mrs. Radnitz	Season 3 (guest role; 1 episode)
