= Deposit Return Scheme (Ireland) =

The Irish deposit-return scheme (DRS), is a container return scheme in operation in Ireland since 1 February 2024.

== Background ==
The EU Single Use Plastics Directive (SUPD) set targets for separate collection of waste single-use PET plastic beverage containers. The target for 2025 is set at 77% by weight, while the target for 2029 is set at 90%. The Irish Government commissioned a report in 2019 to consider options for how to meet these targets. This report concluded:

"DRS is a feasible option for Ireland, and indeed the only way in which it can confidently be asserted that a 90% collection rate for plastic beverage bottles can be achieved"

In 2020, The Irish Government published its "Waste Action Plan for a Circular Economy" which included a plan to introduce a DRS in line with the Programme for Government ("Our Shared Future"), agreed earlier that year.

Also in 2020, the government held a public consultation to examine the implementation options for an Irish DRS,

== The chosen scheme ==

In April 2021, the Dept of Environment published draft regulations to legislate for the chosen form of the scheme. A consortium of drinks producers and retailers, named DRSI, was approved in July 2022 as an Extended Producer Responsibility scheme. Later, DRSI traded as Re-turn.

The regulations were enacted on 19 November 2021

Re-turn operates on a not-for-profit basis, licensed by the Minister for the Environment. It is funded through producer fees, the sale of recyclable materials, and unredeemed deposits, with any surplus reinvested into the scheme rather than distributed as profit.

The scheme applied to aluminium and PET plastic drinks containers from 150ml to 3 litres. It excluded dairy products. The deposit was set at €0.25 for containers above 500ml to 3 litres, and €0.15 for containers from 150ml to 500mls. Retailers were obliged to accept containers for all drinks, including those not sold by those retailers. Retailers were obliged to offer a cash refund rather than just store credit.

Producers were required to modify their labels to include a deposit-return logo to indicate to consumers that the container carries a refundable deposit.

A four month transition period from 1 February 2024 to 31 May was legislated for. During this period, retailers could sell their old stock of drinks, without deposit logos on the labels, along with the new stock, marked with logos.

== Outcome ==
Early complaints included delays, scanner misreads with dented cans, and long queues. Re-turn promised to address these 'teething issues' with equipment upgrades and support.

Irish Business Against Litter, a business group that carries out litter surveys of Irish towns, reported a near 50% fall in litter from plastic bottles and cans following the introduction of DRS.

Coastwatch Ireland, an environmental group that has carried out annual surveys of beach litter since the 1980s, found that bottle and can litter fell to its lowest level in its years of surveys. They stated that the number of cans and bottles counted had dropped from a peak of 100 per km of beach to 8 per km.

By July 2025, 1.6 billion bottles and cans had been collected through the DRS. The recycling rate had risen from 49% to 91%.

== See also ==
- Recycling in the Republic of Ireland
- Deposit-refund system
- Container-deposit legislation
- Deposit return scheme (Scotland)
