= Ladislav Kubík =

Czech-American composer (1946–2017)

Ladislav Kubík (26 August 1946 – 27 October 2017) was a Czech-American composer. His style is associated with other post-war Eastern European composers, such as Krzysztof Penderecki and Witold Lutosławski.

He graduated from the Music and Dance Faculty of the Academy of Performing Arts in Prague, receiving his Master's Degree in 1970 and the title "Aspirante", a degree considered equivalent to the Doctor of Musical Arts.

He previously taught at the Prague Conservatory, Charles University in Prague, and the University of South Florida. He served as Professor of Composition at the Florida State University College of Music in Tallahassee beginning in the 1990–91 academic year.

Teachers: Emil Hlobil, Karel Janacek, Jiri Pauer.

== Prizes and honors ==
- Resident at the American Academy in Rome.
- UNESCO International Rostrum of Composers Prize in Paris for Lament of a Warrior’s Wife (1974)
- UNESCO International Rostrum of Composers Prize in Paris for Concerto No.1 for Piano and Orchestra (1978)
- Intervision Prize
- 1st Prize in the International Franz Kafka Composition Competition for Der Weg (1993)
- 1st Prize in the U.S. NACWPI Composition Contest for Two Episodes for Bass Clarinet, Piano, and Percussion (1995)
- Florida Arts Council Individual Artist Fellowship (1998, 2005)
- John Simon Guggenheim Foundation Fellowship (2010)

== The Ladislav Kubik International Prize in Composition ==
This competition is held biennially under the sponsorship of Florida State University and awarded in conjunction with the same institution's Festival of New Music. A cash prize of $2000 is awarded to the winner.
