= The Letters (2014 film) =

- Theatrical release poster
- Directed by: William Riead
- Written by: William Riead
- Produced by: Colin Azzopardi; Tony Cordeaux
- Starring: Juliet Stevenson; Max von Sydow; Rutger Hauer
- Cinematography: Jack N. Green
- Edited by: Andras Ostrom
- Music by: Ciaran Hope
- Production company: Big Screen Productions V
- Distributed by: Freestyle Releasing; Cinema West Films
- Release dates: February 2014 (Sedona); December 4, 2015 (United States)
- Running time: 119 minutes
- Country: United States
- Language: English
- Budget: $20 million
- Box office: $1.6 million

The Letters is a 2014 American biographical drama film directed and written by William Riead. The film stars Juliet Stevenson, Max von Sydow, Rutger Hauer and Priya Darshini. It was produced by Colin Azzopardi and Tony Cordeaux. It was released theatrically by Freestyle Releasing on December 4, 2015.

== Plot ==
Mother Teresa (Juliet Stevenson), recipient of the Nobel Peace Prize, is considered one of the greatest humanitarians of modern times. Her selfless commitment changed hearts, lives and inspired millions throughout the world. The film is told through personal letters she wrote over the last forty years of her life and reveal a troubled and vulnerable woman who grew to feel an isolation and an abandonment by God. The story is told from the point of view of a Vatican priest (Max von Sydow) charged with the task of investigating acts and events following her death. He recounts her life’s work, her political oppression, her religious zeal, and her unbreakable spirit.

== Cast ==
- Juliet Stevenson as Mother Teresa
- Rutger Hauer as Father Benjamin Praggh
- Max von Sydow as Father Celeste van Exem
- Priya Darshini as Shubashini Das
- Kranti Redkar as Deepa Ambereesh
- Mahabanoo Mody-Kotwal as Mother General
- Tillotama Shome as Kavita Singh
- Vijay Maurya as Maharaj Singh
- Vivek Gomber as Ashwani Sharma
- Pravishi Das as Dinsha Sahu
- Rustom Mistry as Doctor

== Production ==
=== Development ===
Riead began exploring ideas for an inspirational and uplifting film just before the devastating terror attacks of September 11, 2001, forced a realization on him that would come to define his project. “I didn’t know there was that kind of evil in this world until then,” says Riead. “The attacks really brought that home."

The Letters became a labor of love for Riead during the fourteen years it would take to produce the film. The turning point for Riead was the discovery of a startling cache of heartfelt, formerly confidential letters written by Mother Teresa to her spiritual advisor, the Belgian Jesuit priest Celeste van Exem, over a nearly 50-year correspondence. In her letters, some of which have been published in the 2007 book Mother Teresa: Come Be My Light, Teresa revealed a profound spiritual suffering and emptiness experienced by some other saints, often referred to as a dark night of the soul. Riead read all of the letters that were available to the public and decided that they would make up the spine of his screenplay.

=== Casting ===
When the time came to cast the film, Riead had a wealth of actresses clamoring to don Mother Teresa’s habit. To play her confessor, Father van Exem, Riead cast Max von Sydow, the Swedish star who has been a favorite of directors ranging from Ingmar Bergman to Martin Scorsese. When von Sydow asked the director for some insight into the character, Riead gave him a simple but telling answer. “I said, the whole world looked up to Mother Teresa,” he recalls. “And Mother Teresa looked up to Father van Exem. He just looked at me for a long moment, and he said, ‘got it.’ And that was it. He showed up and knew exactly what to do.”

To portray the sisters and students of the Loreto Convent, the Bishop of Calcutta, Mother Teresa’s benefactors, and the residents of the slums, Riead cast professional actors from India’s Bollywood film industry.

=== Filming ===
The film was shot primarily in India, with interiors shot in Goa and second unit filming taking place in Calcutta, Delhi, and Mumbai. The scenes featuring Max von Sydow and Rutger Hauer (as van Exem’s confidant, Father Benjamin Praagh), were shot in a 15th-century London monastery.

=== Music ===
At its peak, The Sony Classical release of Ciaran Hope's original soundtrack album for "The Letters" was receiving over 100,000 streams per month, with the track "Mother Teresa" reaching a total of over 2 million streams on Spotify. The album also features the hit single "Run" from the international award-winning artist, Leona Lewis. Recorded with the Macedonian Radio Symphonic Orchestra in Mother Teresa's hometown of Skopje Macedonia and the New Dublin Voices Choir in her spiritual birthplace of Dublin Ireland, the score is a powerful addition to the contemplative music canon.

Hope collaborated with writer-director William Riead for over a decade as they brought the film to fruition. The final score was written over the course of a year with the director and composer finessing the score to capture the reverence they felt when watching actress Juliet Stevenson's portrayal of the Saint of the Gutters.

In 2016 the score's Agnus Dei was performed live in Rome's imposing Pantheon Basilica by the voices of the PfizerPfonics, a Cork-based choir, as part of the 5th Rome Music Festival. Journalist Catherine Foley captured the mood in her article, Preaching to the choir – An Irishwoman’s Diary on PfizerPfonics and Rome’s Pantheon, when she wrote "The music rose, floating like a whisper over our heads where we sat in the pews of the Pantheon in Rome, one of the eternal city’s most ancient temples."

== Release ==
The Letters premiered at the Sedona Film Festival in February 2014. It was released theatrically on December 4, 2015.

=== Reception ===
On the review aggregator website Rotten Tomatoes, 29% of 38 critics' reviews are positive, with an average rating of 4.4/10. The website's consensus reads: "The Letters tries to honor Mother Teresa with an unstintingly positive portrayal of her life and works, but ends up smothering a fascinating real-life story under a bland hagiography." Metacritic, which uses a weighted average, assigned the film a score of 25 out of 100, based on 11 critics, indicating "generally unfavorable" reviews.

According to Variety, "Though much mention is made of Teresa’s feeling that she had been abandoned by God, there’s no actual sign of that distress in The Letters, thereby leaving its portrait feeling flimsy and half-formed. Opting for dutiful, reverent beatification over flesh-and-blood characterizations (or insights), the film is merely a clunky primer on how poor storytelling can make even the grandest of figures seem small — a fact that’s true with regard to Teresa as well as von Sydow, in a monotonous, creaky performance best left off his resume."

According to The Hollywood Reporter, "A movie exploring the conflict between Teresa’s outward confidence and private “darkness” could be psychologically fascinating. But simply having Von Sydow tell us over and over that she felt “a terrible emptiness” is no substitute for showing that torment in action. Not a trace of doubt or existential despair comes across in scenes of the nun’s life, and the script doesn’t even dip into those letters (a collection of which was published years ago) to let us hear of it in her own words."
