= Patrick Mason (theatre director) =

British theatre director (born 1951)

Patrick Mason (born 1951 in London) is a British theatre director.

== Background ==
Mason was educated at Downside School and trained at the Central School of Speech and Drama in London. He was appointed fellow in drama at the University of Manchester in 1974 and then lecturer in performance studies. He joined the Abbey Theatre in Dublin as a resident director in 1977 but later left to become a freelance theatre director. In 1992 he won a Tony Award and a Drama Desk Award as director of Dancing at Lughnasa on Broadway. He returned to the Abbey Theatre as artistic director from 1993 to 1999.

Mason has been in a relationship with his partner Sean McCarthy (a former schoolteacher at a secondary school in Rathmines) for around 4 decades. The couple met through the Abbey Theatre and live in Ranelagh, County Dublin. Mason is 9 years younger than his partner.
