= Deposit-refund system =

Surcharge refunded when part of a product is returned

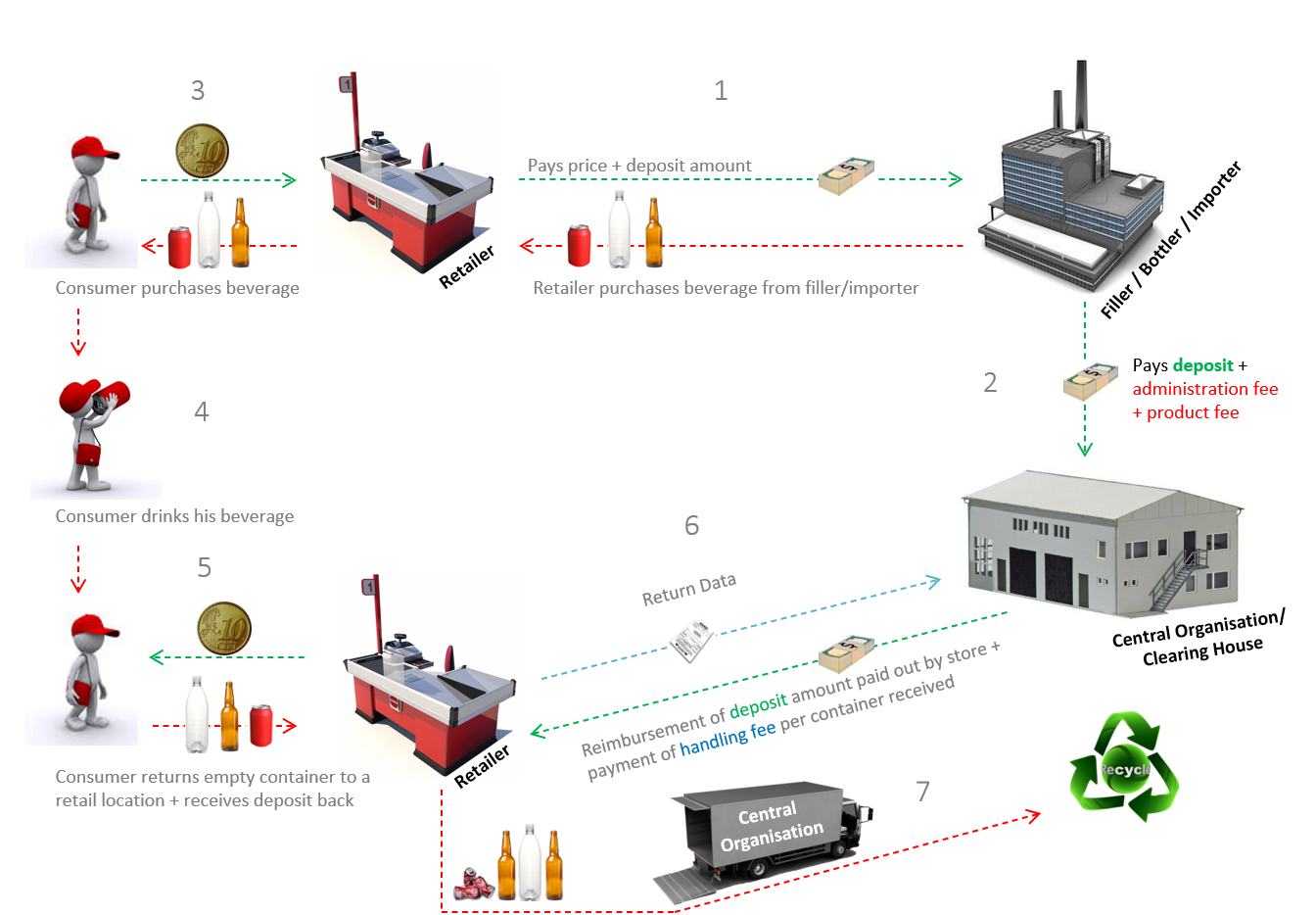
A Schematic Representation of Deposit Return Scheme in Scandinavian Countries

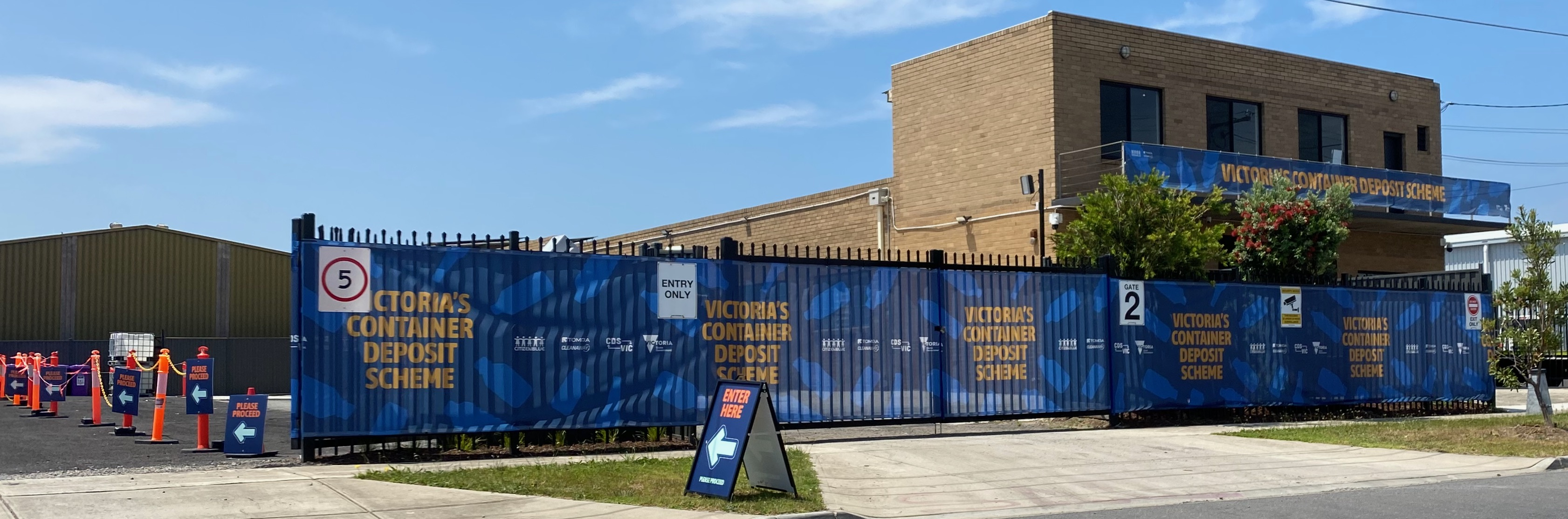
A container deposit refund facility in Melbourne Australia

A deposit-refund system (DRS), also known as deposit-return system, advance deposit fee or deposit-return scheme, are systems that add a surcharge on a product when purchased and a rebate when its packaging is returned. A well-known example is when container deposit legislation mandates that a refund is given when reusable packaging is returned. A DRS is a market-based instrument to address externalities, similar to a pigovian tax, with the key difference that a DRS refunds the fee after the product is returned. This provides an incentive to consumers to properly dispose of a product.

While most commonly used with beverage containers, DRS can be used on other materials including liquid and gaseous wastes. A DRS is used on products such as batteries, tyres, automotive oil, consumer electronics and shipping pallets.

There are three potential advantages of a DRS: it reduces illegal dumping by giving a financial incentive, it makes monitoring and enforcement easier, and evading the costs is difficult.

A potential disadvantage is, that DRS can focus on the collection of single-use beverage packaging and replace systems for multi-use packaging return systems (for example in Germany).

DRS is said to be based on the principles of Extended Producer Responsibility.

In February 2025 the European Union introduced the Packaging and Packaging Waste Regulation (PPWR), this regulation will come into effect on 12 August 2026 and is likely to significantly increase the volume of DRS schemes implemented to achieve the objectives of the PPWR.

The UK will introduce a Deposit Return Scheme in October 2027 under the trading name of "Exchange for Change".

DRS can be either voluntary or mandated by legislation.

== See also ==
- Container-deposit legislation
- Circular economy
- Environmental economics
- Oregon Bottle Bill
- Product stewardship
- Reverse vending machine
- Waste management
