= Shimon Shteynberg =

Ukrainian composer

Shimon Shteynberg (Ukrainian: Семен Наумович Штейнберґ; Yiddish: שמעון שטיינבערג; alternative Latinized spelling: Simon Steinberg; 21 June 1887, Odessa – 20 July 1955, Chernivtsi) was a Ukrainian composer and a music director of the Ukrainian State Jewish Theatre.

== Biography ==
Shteynberg was born in Odessa into a Jewish family of modest means. He started playing violin at an early age being first taught by his stepfather, a renowned local wedding toast-master and fiddler, and later by M. Chait in Karl Lagler's Music School. After working in city's theatre orchestras for several years, he was accepted into a newly founded Odessa Conservatoire where he studied composition under Witold Maliszewski. Upon graduation in 1919 Shteynberg continued composing, contributing to various theatres in Ukraine. He became music director and a major composer of the Ukrainian Jewish Theater since its inception in Kharkiv in 1925, working through its existence in Kiev (there theatre was popularly known as Kiev GOSET), and later in Chernivtsi, until its liquidation in 1949, at the height of Stalin's anti-Semitic campaign. In his latter years he taught in Chernivtsi Music College.

== Compositions ==
Shteynberg composed music to more than 150 plays, including “Tevye the Milkman”, “Wandering Stars”, ”Stempenyu” by Shalom Aleichem,”Favourful people” after Mendele Mocher Sforim, ”Uprising in Ghetto” by Peretz Markish, ”In fire” by M.Daniel, ”Russian People” by Konstantin Simonov, ”The Merchant of Venice”, “The Taming of the Shrew ” by William Shakespeare etc. Along with Lev Pulver and Lev Yampolsky, he was one of the major contributors to the bulk of incidental music for Jewish theatres of the former USSR. Shteynberg was also a prolific writer of symphonic and chamber music, songs, and arrangements of ethnic tunes by peoples of Jewish, Ukrainian, Kazakh, Uzbek and other origins. His music, rooted into a late-romantic tradition of the turn of the 20th century as well as Jewish cantorial and klezmer heritage, was recognized for its beauty, expressivity, compositional depth and sophistication. However, it fell into obscurity due to decades-long attitude of Soviet authorities toward everything Jewish. In December 1987 the Music College of Chernivtsi commemorated his 100th anniversary with an evening of his music, which was warmly received by the public. There are no known audio recordings of his music available.
