= 200000 (disambiguation) =

200,000, 200000, 20,0000, 2,00000, 2E5, 20^{5}, two hundred thousand, thenty myriad may refer to:

- the decimal number "200,000" and values associated with that range and magnitude
- Korail Class 200000
- 200 000 Taler
- 200000, 1923 Soviet staging of Dos groyse gevins
