= Yehupetz =

Fictional town in Jewish literature

Yehupetz (Yiddish: יעהופיץ, Hebrew: יהופיץ, Ukrainian: Єгупець, romanized: Yehupets) is a semifictional city in the Russian Empire, a portrayal of Kyiv (Ukraine) in Sholem Aleichem stories. It can be viewed as a transitional place between the classical shtetl and a modern city.

== Name ==
The name derives from Ukrainian: Єгипет, romanized: Yehypet for "Egypt". It is suggested the reason for the selection of the name lies in the experiences of the writer, in reference to the Jewish slavery in Egypt. Victoria Khiterer draws another parallel: "Just as the Hebrews had suffered in Egypt under the pharaohs, so Kyiv Jews suffered under their local "pharaohs", as policemen were called in Russian slang". While Kyiv was geographically within the Pale of settlement, tsar Nicholas I expelled the Jews from Kyiv end excluded the city from the Pale in 1835. Therefore, living in Kyiv was illegal for Jews, but they were drawn to the city due to the poverty in the Pale, and "pharaohs" worked hard to catch and expel the illegals. Officials and residents responded to Jewish immigration to the city with antisemitism, and pogroms followed.

The nickname "Yehupetz" was widely used by the Jewish population of Kyiv. There is a literary almanac called Yehupetz) that has been published in Kyiv since 1995.

The actual name "Kiev" was used only in one of Sholem Aleichem's works: his 1916 autobiographical novel פונעם יאריד (Funem yarid, translated as From the Fair).

== Portrayal ==
Yehupetz is featured in many of Sholem Aleichem's works, including those about Tevye the Dairyman and Menahem-Mendl and about the shtetl of Kasrilevka.

Tevye lived outside of a fictional Anatevka, a village near a settlement named called Boiberik (based on real-life Boiarka, a suburb of Yehupetz). Most of his customers lived in Yehupetz. In Tevye's encounters with them, he describes them as rich, saying "rich folks from Yehupetz", "rich man from Yehupetz", etc.

Every summer all the rich folks from Yehupetz go to their dachas in Boiberik. And these Yehupetz folks are all very refined people who are used to having everything served up to them—wood for the fire, meat and eggs, chickens and onions, peppers and radishes. Why shouldn’t someone make it his business to bring to their doorstep every morning milk, cheese, butter, and sour cream? And as the Yehupetzers like to eat well and don’t give a fig about money, you can charge high prices. (From The Great Windfall)

From the story "The Roof Falls In" (also translated as "Tevye Blows A Small Fortune" or "The Bubble Bursts") we learn that Tevye and Menahem-Mendl first meet in Yehupetz, where Menahem-Mendl had already been living illegally for a year and a half, and they chat about Menahem-Mendl's financial dealings, "how one day he's rich and the next a pauper" (which are detailed in Chapter II: "Papers: The Yehupetz stock exchange" of The Adventures of Mehahem-Mendl). Menahem-Mendl tries to convince Tevye to join his speculations, arguing that Yehupetz is a city of opportunities: "There are in Yehupetz those who were not too long ago going around without shoes, were nobodies, servants, porters. Today they have their own houses made of stone surrounded by high walls. Their wives complain about their indigestion and go abroad for a cure, while they ride around Yehupetz on rubber wheels and pretend not to know anyone!"

In the 1907 story "Sprintze" we learn that a great misfortune had befallen the Jews of Yehupetz and that all the wealthy ones had rushed out: "God wanted to do something for His Jews, and so a misfortune befell us, a disaster, a constitutzia! Ay, a constitutzia! Suddenly our rich people panicked and stampeded out of Yehupetz, heading abroad, supposedly to the spas to take the waters, to the mineral baths to calm their nerves—pure nonsense." Here "constitutzia" refers to tsar's October Manifesto in which the first Russian Constitution was promised, and which was followed by the 1905 Kyiv pogrom (and other pogroms all over the Russian Empire).

Antoni Bortnowski remarks that Yehupetz was not the only portrayal of Kyiv by Sholem Aleichem. A very unpleasant image of an unnamed town was given in the novel The Bloody Hoax, but numerous hints, such as "a large glorious city where a Jew needs a residence permit", point at Kyiv.

== See also ==
- Kasrilevka, another fictional city (shtetl) in Sholem Aleichem's stories
