= Ben Zion Goldberg =

Belarusian-born Jewish-American journalist (1895–1972)

Benjamin Waife (January 9, 1895 – December 29, 1972), better known by his pen name Ben Zion Goldberg, was a Belarusian-born Jewish-American journalist.

== Life ==
Goldberg was born on January 9, 1895, in Halshany, Russia, the son of Moses Waife and Hanna Margolis. His father was a rabbi, and his mother was a descendent of Abraham Hirsch Eisenstadt and Shabbatai HaKohen.

Goldberg attended the Lida Yeshiva, followed by the Volozhin Yeshiva. He also lived and studied with his grandfather in Dvinsk. His father left for America when he was ten, and in 1907 he went to America with his family and settled in New York City, New York. He lived in Michigan and Iowa from 1908 to 1914, attending elementary and middle schools there and spending a year at the University of Iowa. He returned to New York City in 1914. He then studied psychology at Columbia University, receiving a B.S. from there in 1918 and a M.A. in 1919. He joined the staff of Der Tog in 1922, becoming its associate editor in 1924 and managing editor in 1935. He covered the 1927 Henry Ford-Aaron Sapiro trial. He conducted a column called The World Today for the Brooklyn Daily Eagle from 1932 to 1933. He also contributed to publications like local papers in Traverse City, Michigan, Current History, and The Outlook. He was a member of the Jewish National Workers Alliance, the Press Club, and the Jewish Writers Club. He was also a director of the Jewish Peoples University and an instructor of the Jewish Workers University and the Jewish Teachers Seminary.

Goldberg served as managing editor of Der Tog until 1940 and wrote articles on psychology and foreign policy. A daily columnist for over forty years, he proved influential and controversial, especially with his pro-Soviet stance that ended with the purge of Soviet Jewish leaders. He was an organizer of the American branch of YIVO. He wrote some books in English, including Sacred Fire: The Story of Sex in Religion in 1930 and The Jewish Problem in the Soviet Union in 1961. He also wrote Soviet-farband: faynt oder fraynt? in 1947. He wrote a weekly column for Al HaMishmar, served as editor of Eynikeit from 1943 to 1946 and of Jewish Digest in 1943, and was a correspondent of the St. Louis Post-Dispatch, the Toronto Daily Star, and The New Republic. He was president of the Committee of Jewish Writers, Artists, and Scientists from 1943 to 1945.

Three days after Yiddish humorist Sholem Aleichem came to America, Goldberg went to his hotel and invited him to lecture to Yiddish-speaking students at Columbia University. Sholem Aleichem asked him to instead find an apartment for him with his daughter. Goldberg found an apartment and later married the daughter, Marie Waife. Their children were Dr. Sholom O. Waife of Indianapolis, Indiana and Jewish Home and Hospital for the Aged executive director Mitchell M. Waife of New York. In 1964, he helped found Beit Sholom Aleichem in Israel, which by 1972 housed over 300 manuscripts and memorabilia from Sholem Aleichem.

Goldberg died from a heart attack in a hospital in Tel Aviv, Israel, where he was visiting to write a series of articles and engage in research, on December 29, 1972. He was buried in the writers' section of Kiryat Shaul Cemetery. Histadrut General-Secretary Yitzhak Ben-Aharon spoke at the funeral parlor, and the cortege stopped at Beth Sholom-Aleichem, where its director Avraham Liss spoke about Goldberg. At the graveside, Histadrut treasurer Yehoshua Levi and Al HaMishmar editor Yaakov Amit also delivered eulogies.
