= The Bloody Hoax =

1913 Yiddish novel

The Bloody Hoax (Yiddish: דער בלוטיקער שפאס : א אויסערגעווענלעכער ראמאן, romanized: Der blutiker shpas: a oysergevenlekher roman) is a novel by Sholem Aleichem written in Yiddish. It was first published serialized in a Warsaw daily Haynt in 1912.

The idea was same as in The Prince and the Pauper: two school friends, a Russian, Grigory "Grisha" Popov, and a Jew, Hershel "Hershke" Rabinovich, (Note: The surnames are a pun: Popov comes from the Russian word поп, 'priest', and Rabinovich comes from 'rabbi', and the first names "Grishka" and "Hershke" sound similarly.) decide to swap identities and to live each other's life for a year. The title refers to the twist of the plot: the Russian (Christian) young man fell victim of a blood libel, being accused of killing a Christian child. It was hastily written during the times of the Beilis Affair, and a vast majority of contemporary and later critics considered it to be a failure. Probably for this reason it was not republished nor translated for quite a long time. It later times it started to be considered of historical/ethnographical interest.

== Publications and adaptations ==
In book form it was published in Warsaw in 1915, in volumes 16-18 of "Yubileum-oysgabe" ("Jubilee Edition").

English translation by Aliza Shevrin, 1991.

Hebrew: מהתלת הדם, romanized: Mahatalat ha-dam, 1985, translated by Aryeh Aharoni.

The complete novel (with omissions of some parts which Sholem Aleichem thought will be of no interest for Russian readers) was translated into Russian by Sarra Ravich, published in 1914 by publisher "Универсальное книгоиздательствo" Лазаря Столяра. An abridged version Russian: Кровавая шутка, romanized: Krovavaya shutka was translated in the Soviet times by David Glikman in 1928 (w:ru:Кровавая шутка (Шолом-Алейхем)). During the collapse of the Soviet Union the translation was republished several times with the misleading advertisements saying that the novel was banned in the Soviet Union.

1918 Russian lost film: Russian: Кровавая шутка, based on the novel, directed by Alexander Arkatov, screenwriter Vladimir Voildo, cinematographer Grigory Drobin (Григорий Дробин).
