= Olha Andriiko =

Ukrainian legal scholar

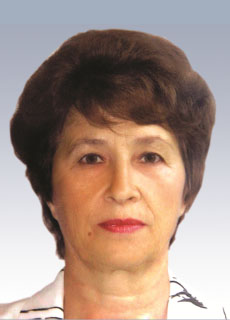
Andriyko Olga Fedorivna take on 18 February 2011

Olha Fedorivna Andriiko (Ukrainian: Ольга Федорівна Андрійко; born January 28, 1945, Voronkiv, Kyiv Oblast) is a Doctor of Law, Professor, Head of the Department of Constitutional, Administrative and Financial Law of the Kyiv University of Law of the National Academy of Sciences of Ukraine, and Deputy Head of the Department of State and Legal Problems of Management of the V. M. Koretsky Institute of State and Law of the National Academy of Sciences of Ukraine.

== Biography ==
She was born on 28 January 1945 in the village of Voronkiv, Boryspil Raion, Kyiv Oblast to a family of peasants.

== Education ==
In 1967–1972, she studied at the Law Faculty of Taras Shevchenko National University of Kyiv.

Since 1972, she has been a postgraduate student at the Institute of State and Law.

In 1976 she defended her dissertation for the degree of Candidate of Law.

Since 1976 she has been working at the V.M. Koretsky Institute of State and Law: first as a junior researcher, since 1986 as a senior researcher, and since 2000 as a leading researcher.

Since 1996, she has been the Head of the Department of Administrative and Financial Law at the Kyiv University of Law of the National Academy of Sciences of Ukraine.

In 1999, O. Andriyko defended her doctoral dissertation "Organizational and Legal Problems of State Control in the Executive Branch", and in 2004, by the decision of the Higher Attestation Commission of Ukraine, O. Andriyko was awarded the academic title of Professor.

== Areas of scientific work ==
In her research, O. F. Andriyko focuses on the problems of public administration and administrative law. She is a leading expert in Ukraine on the problems of public administration and, in particular, the problems of organizational and legal support of state control.

During the period of her scientific activity, O.F. Andriyko has prepared more than 100 scientific works, including several individual monographs, chapters in collective monographs and textbooks, in particular, "Legal Issues of Automation of Management of Production Association" (1979), "Control in a Democratic State: Problems and Trends" (1994), "Public Administration: Theory and Practice" (1998), "State Control in the Sphere of Executive Power" (1999), "Executive Power and Administrative Law" (2002), "Public Administration: Problems of Administrative and Legal Theory and Practice" (2003). "Administrative Law of Ukraine, Academic Course (in two volumes) Volume 1" (2004). An important event in the scientific life was the publication in 2004 of an individual monograph by O. F. Andriyko "State Control in Ukraine: Organizational and Legal Principles" (K., Naukova Dumka, 2004).

О. F. Andriyko actively cooperates with government agencies, provides scientific and advisory assistance to the Committees of the Verkhovna Rada of Ukraine, and is constantly involved in scientific and expert work by the Main Directorate of the State Service of Ukraine.

O. F. Andriyko's scientific developments were in demand during the preparation of the Concept of Administrative Reform in Ukraine. She is actively involved in legislative work, in particular, as a member of the teams developing the drafts of the Concept of Administrative Law Reform, the Code of Civil Servant Conduct, the Administrative Procedure Code of Ukraine, the Concept of the System of Legislation of Ukraine on Civil Service, and is the author of the scientific Concept of the draft law on state control in the field of executive power.

== Awards and honors ==
Andriyko's was awarded the Yaroslav the Wise Prize for a series of monographic works on administrative law as part of a group of authors. She was also awarded the Order of Princess Olga, III degree.
