= Moishe Goldblatt =

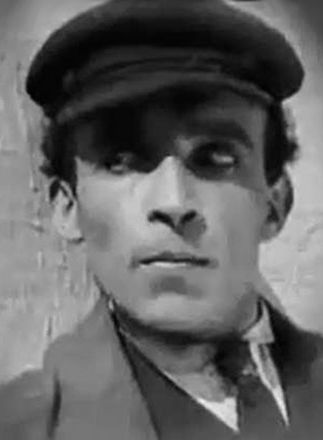
- Native name: משה גאָלדבלאַט
- Born: December 16, 1896 Herța, Romania (now Hertsa, Ukraine)
- Died: 1974 Haifa, Israel
- Language: Yiddish
- Period: 1925–1969
- Genre: Yiddish theatre
- Literary movement: Yiddishism

Moishe Goldblatt (Yiddish: משה גאָלדבלאַט, romanized: Moyshe Goldblat; Russian: Моисей Исаакович Гольдблат; Romanian: Moisei Goldblat; 16 December 1896, Herța, Dorohoi County, Romania – 1974, Haifa, Israel) was a Jewish actor and director in a Yiddish theatre, as well as in Russian and Romani theatre. He was the founder and first artistic director of the Moscow Romani Theatre Romen (1931–1937).

== Early years and the Moscow GOSET ==
Zalmen Zylbercweig's Leksikon fun yidishn teater says that he was born in the northern Moldavian town of Herța in Romania (now in Chernivtsi Oblast, Ukraine). He studied in a cheder and then two years in a Romanian primary school, later one year in a "modernized cheder" (cheder metukan).

As a teenager he joined a travelling Jewish troupe from Galați. He served in the Royal Romanian Army during the First World War, but, after the Russian Revolution of 1917, in September, he fled to Soviet Russia. From 1918 to 1921 he performed in a mobile Jewish theatre touring various towns of Ukraine. In 1924 he graduated from the theatre studio of the Moscow State Jewish Theatre (GOSET) under Alexei Granovsky; he had already been part of the main acting troupe since 1923. In 1925 he played one of the leading roles in Granovsky's film Jewish Luck, based on the works of Sholem Aleichem.

Until 1937 he worked at the Moscow GOSET and taught acting at the Moscow State Jewish Theatre School (MGETU). He was one of the leading actors of the troupe during its golden age in the late 1920s and early 1930s under the direction of Solomon Mikhoels.

== The Romani Theatre ==
In line with Soviet policies of supporting minority cultures, in 1929 Goldblatt took charge of an amateur troupe of young Romani performers. With the support of Commissar of Education Anatoly Lunacharsky, on 24 January 1931 he founded and headed the theatre-studio Indo-Romen under the Chief Directorate of Arts of the RSFSR. On 16 December that year, the studio gained professional status (later becoming the Romen Theatre). The stage designer was Alexander Tyshler, the musical director S. M. Bugachevsky, the literary director Ivan Rom-Lebedev, and the administrator the veteran Jewish actor I. D. Fail.

Goldblatt was artistic director and chief stage director of the Indo-Romen theatre-studio until 1936. Productions of these years were staged in the Romani language, beginning with the revue Atasya i dadyves ("Yesterday and Today") on 30 April 1931. He went on to direct Life on Wheels (1931), The Pharaoh’s Tribe (1933), Between the Fires (1934), an adaptation of Prosper Mérimée’s Carmen, and several works by Ivan Rom-Lebedev including A Camp in the Steppe (1934), Daughter of the Steppes (1935) and A Wedding in the Camp (1935). His final work for the Indo-Romen theatre was a 1936 production of Pushkin’s poem The Gypsies, with music by Alexander Krein and designs by Tyshler.

In 1935, Goldblatt co-directed with Yevgeny Shneider the film The Last Camp, produced at the Gorky Film Studio and featuring Nikolai Mordvinov, Mikhail Yanshin, and actors of Indo-Romen, including the famous singer Lyalya Chyornaya. After his departure, the troupe was led by M. M. Yanshin and its productions were shifted to the Russian language.

Goldblatt also translated plays from Russian and Romanian to Yiddish.

== Birobidzhan and Kiev GOSET ==
From 1937 to 1939 Goldblatt served as artistic director of the newly founded Birobidzhan State Jewish Theatre (BirGOSET), where he returned to serious dramatic material. He staged Moishe Kulbak’s plays Boitre-Gazlen (Boitre the Robber) and Binyomen the Maggid (both 1937), until the theatre was forced to halt them following Kulbak's arrest. In 1938–1939 he staged Tevye der milkhiker (Tevye the Dairyman), Mentshn (People), and Karl Gutzkow’s Uriel Acosta. The productions featured designs by Moscow artists N. A. Shifrin and I. B. Rabichev, and music by composer L. M. Pulver and choreographer Ya. D. Itskhoki.

Later in 1939 Goldblatt became head of the Kiev State Jewish Theatre (GOSET), located at 29 Khreshchatyk Street. His first production there was Shmuel Halkin’s historical tragedy Bar-Kokhba, based on Avrom Goldfaden’s play (designed by Nathan Altman). In Der Farkishefter Shnayder ("The Enchanted Tailor", 1940), based on Sholem Aleichem, Goldblatt served both as director and actor in the leading role of Shimen-Ele. He also staged The Ten Commandments, Afm Boydem a Yared ("A Fair in the Attic"), Peretz Markish’s Kol-Nidre, A. Huberman’s It Is Worth Living in This World, and others. Goldblatt himself wrote music and lyrics for several of these productions.

With the outbreak of World War II the theatre was evacuated to Dzhambul (later to Kokand and Fergana). During this time Goldblatt was also appointed artistic director of the Kazakh State Academic Drama Theatre (1941–1944) in Alma-Ata. In 1942 he appeared in Boris Barnet’s short film The Priceless Head (Combat Film Collection No. 10). After the liberation of Ukraine, the Kiev GOSET was transferred to Chernivtsi, where Goldblatt remained its artistic director until the theatre, along with all Jewish theatres in the USSR, was closed on 15 February 1950 during the campaign against "rootless cosmopolitans".

On 10 March 1945 the first season in Chernivtsi opened with Moishe Pinchevsky’s play Ikh leb… ("I Live…"), featuring Goldblatt as the Holocaust survivor Tsale Shafir. The play was soon criticised for nationalist tendencies and ideological shortcomings. Goldblatt had first staged it during the wartime evacuation in Kazakhstan. Other successful productions included Sholem Aleichem's Tevye the Dairyman (with Goldblatt as Tevye) and The Wandering Stars (Di Blondezhende Shtern) with Solomon Bider. In its final year (1949) the theatre presented thirteen premieres.

== Later years ==
In the late 1940s Goldblatt was investigated in connection with the Jewish Anti-Fascist Committee case but was not arrested. From 1951 to 1959 he served as artistic director of the Kazakh State Academic Drama Theatre (now named after Mukhtar Auezov) and simultaneously as stage director at the State Russian Academic Drama Theatre named after Lermontov in Alma-Ata. He later worked as an actor at the Kharkiv Russian Drama Theatre until 1969.

Goldblatt authored memoirs on Les Kurbas and Solomon Mikhoels (1969), as well as later unpublished reminiscences about Mikhoels and Benjamin Zuskin (1974). In Yiddish he wrote a survey of Soviet Jewish theatre history, Der ufkum un umkum fun der idisher teater-kultur in Sovetn-farband ("The Rise and Fall of Jewish Theatrical Culture in the Soviet Union"), preserved in his archive at the Goldstein-Goren Diaspora Research Center, Tel Aviv University, Israel. From 1972 he lived in Haifa, Israel.

== Family ==
Wife: Eva Isaakovna Shapiro, actress. Grandson: Avigdor Freydlis, artistic director of the Kyiv Jewish Musical-Drama Theatre (EMDT).

== Honours and awards ==
- Order of the Red Banner of Labour (3 January 1959)
- Merited Art Worker of the Ukrainian SSR (1945)
- People's Artist of the Kazakh SSR (1943)
- Order of the Badge of Honour (31 March 1939)
- Medal "For Distinguished Labour" (31 March 1939)
- Honored Artist of the RSFSR (5 March 1935)

== Filmography ==
=== As actor ===
- 1925 — Jewish Luck, dir. Alexei Granovsky.
- 1942 — The Priceless Head («Бесценная голова»), in Combat Film Collection No. 10, dir. Boris Barnet, Yefim Aron.

=== As director ===
- 1935 — The Last Gypsy Camp («Последний табор»; co-directed with Yevgeny Shneider).
