= Menahem-Mendl =

Epistolary novel by Sholem Aleichem

Menahem-Mendl (Yiddish: מנחם מענדל) is a series of stories in Yiddish by Sholem Aleichem about hilarious exploits of an optimistic shlemiel Menahem-Mendl, who dreams of getting rich. They are presented as an exchange of letters between him and his ever-scolding wife Sheyne-Shendl, and later published as epistolary novels.

== Character ==
From the story The Roof Falls In, in which Tevye the Milkman meets Menahem-Mendl we learn that his full name is Menachem-Mendl Boruch-Hersh Leah-Dvossi's and he is a distant relative of Tevye, hailing from Kasrilevka (as also hinted in Sholem Aleichem's story "Eighteen from Pereshchepena").

However in the Menahem-Mendl stories we meet him mainly in Yehupetz (a portrayal of Kiev in Sholem Aleichem stories) before he goes to America.

Menahem-Mendl is "arguably the most famous representation of the Luftmentsh, "man of the air", a Yiddish economic metaphor for Jewish poverty: petty traders, peddlers, various paupers, i.e., people with no definite occupation. He is a naive person, constantly scolded by his down-to-the earth wife, who stays at home and despises the enterprises of her husband. In early 20th century Menahem-Mendl became an archetype petty entrepreneur and his name was used metaphorically. In his quest to fortune Menahem-Mendl fails in all his endeavors: as a currency and stock speculator, as a shadkhn (marriage broker), as writer, and as an insurance agent.

Hillel Halkin in the preface of his translation of Menahem-Mendl notices that unlike Tevye, Mehahem-Mendl does not have a real-life prototype, despite Sholem Aleichem in his own preface to the 1910 edition wrote that Menahem-Mendl is a real person, with whom "the author was personally and intimately acquainted, having lived through a great deal with him for nearly 20 years". Halkin suggests that this statement is a tongue-in-cheek reference to the writer himself, who indeed was engaged in stock speculations, among other occupations, and traveled a lot, although the stories are in no way autobiographical.

== Publication history ==
The stories were written during 1892-1913 in various publications. In 1909 the first book was printed under the title מנחם מענדל, reprinted in 1910 in a significantly abridged form. In 1913, 45 more letters were printed in the Yiddish daily Haynt, and from which the second volume was published.

The first book was first translated in English as The Adventures of Mehahem-Mendl in 1969 by Tamara Kahana, the second one was first translated as The Further Adventures of Menachem-Mendl: (New York―Warsaw―Vienna―Yehupetz) in 2001.

The (translation of the) 1910 edition the stories are grouped in six chapters:

- I: London: (Note: "Londons" refer to perishable goods, as Menakmen-Mendl explains to his wife: "...Londons, you should know, are highly perishable. You buy and sell them on a pledge without seeing them...") The stock exchange in Odessa (לאנדאן (אדעסער בערזע))
- II: Papers: The Yehupetz stock exchange (פאפירלעך (יעהופעצער בערזע))
- III: Millions: Merchants, brokers, and speculators (מיליאָנען (סוחרים, מעקלערס און "שפּעגעלאַנטען))
- IV: A respectable occupation: Menahem-Mendl, writer (א בכבוד'ע פרנסה (מנחם-מענדל - א שרייבער))
- V: No luck!: Menahem-Mendl, marriage broker (עס פידלט נישט (מנחם-מענדל - א שדכן))
- VI: Terrible luck!: Menahem-Mendl, agent. (שלים-שלים-מזל (מנחם-מענדל - אן אגענט))

It also has a vitriolic postscript commentary from his shviger (mother-in-law).

In 2002 the translation of the second edition of the first book by Hillel Halkin was published as The Letters of Mehaknem-Mendl and Shayne-Sheyndl by Yale University.

- Londons: The Odessa Exchange
- Stocks & Bonds: The Yehupetz Exchange
- Millions: Traders, Agents, and Speculators
- An Honorable Profession: Menakhem-Mendl Becomes a Writer
- It’s No Go: Menakhem-Mendl the Matchmaker
- Always a Loser: Menakhem-Mendl the Insurance Agent

Manachem-Mendl is among the characters of the unpublished play יקנ”ז (Yaknez; 1894), a satire on brokers and speculators from Yehupetz.

== Other media ==
=== Jewish Luck ===
Jewish Luck

In 1925, a silent film Jewish Luck (Russian: Еврейское счастье) was released in the Soviet Union directed by Alexey Granovsky, starring Solomon Mikhoels as Mehahem-Mendl. The Russian intertitles were written by Isaac Babel. The film was one of the first Soviet Yiddish films released in the United States.

The initial setting is in Berdichev (Note: Berdichev was described as "the most Jewish" town of the Russian Empire and early Soviet Union. According to the 1897 Russian Census, 80% of its 54,000 population were Jews (s:1911 Encyclopædia Britannica/Berdichev)) rather than Kasrilevka.

In 1991 the restored version was released produced by the National Center for Jewish Film, with new English intertitles by Robert Szulkin.

The Menahem-Mendl adventures were dramatized by the Moscow State Yiddish Theater as the last Soviet stage production by Granovsky, Luftmentshn (see wikt:luftmensch) in 1928.

=== Tevye and His Seven Daughters ===
In the 1968 Israeli film Tevye and His Seven Daughters Mehahem-Mendl (Illy Gorlitsky) acting as a shadkhn (marriage broker) borrows from Tevye 33 rubles of dowry money to play on stock exchange promising hefty return, a promise never kept.
