= Jewish Luck =

1925 film

- Russian: Еврейское счастье
- Directed by: Aleksey Granovsky
- Written by: Sholom Aleichem; Isaak Babel; Grigori Gritscher; Boris Leonidov; Isaak Teneromo
- Starring: Solomon Mikhoels; Moisey Goldblat; Tamara Adelgeym; Alexander Epstein; Ilya Rogaler
- Cinematography: Vasili Khvatov; Nicolai Strukov; Eduard Tisse
- Music by: Lev Pulver
- Release date: 1925
- Country: Soviet Union

Jewish Luck (Russian: Еврейское счастье) is a 1925 Soviet black and white silent film directed by Aleksey Granovsky.

== Plot ==
Menahem-Mendl, with the goal of making money, opens an insurance company, and he involved in the street haberdashery trade, but all is unsuccessful. Suddenly he learns the names of rich brides and designs to become a shadkhn (matchmaker).

== Cast ==
- Solomon Mikhoels as Menahem-Mendl
- Moisei Goldblat as Zalman
- Tamara Adelgeym as Belya Kimbach
- A. Epstein as Iosele, son of Mehahem-Mendl
- I. Rogaler as Usher, shadlhn
