= Dos groyse gevins =

Two works by Sholem Aleichem

Dos groyse gevins (Yiddish: דאָס גרויסע געווינס, lit. 'The Big Win') is the title of two works by Sholem Aleichem with essentially different content. The first one is a 1903 short story, written in 1894 and first published in 1895 under the title "Tevye der milkhiker". The second one is a 1915 play.

== Dos groyse gevins (1903) ==
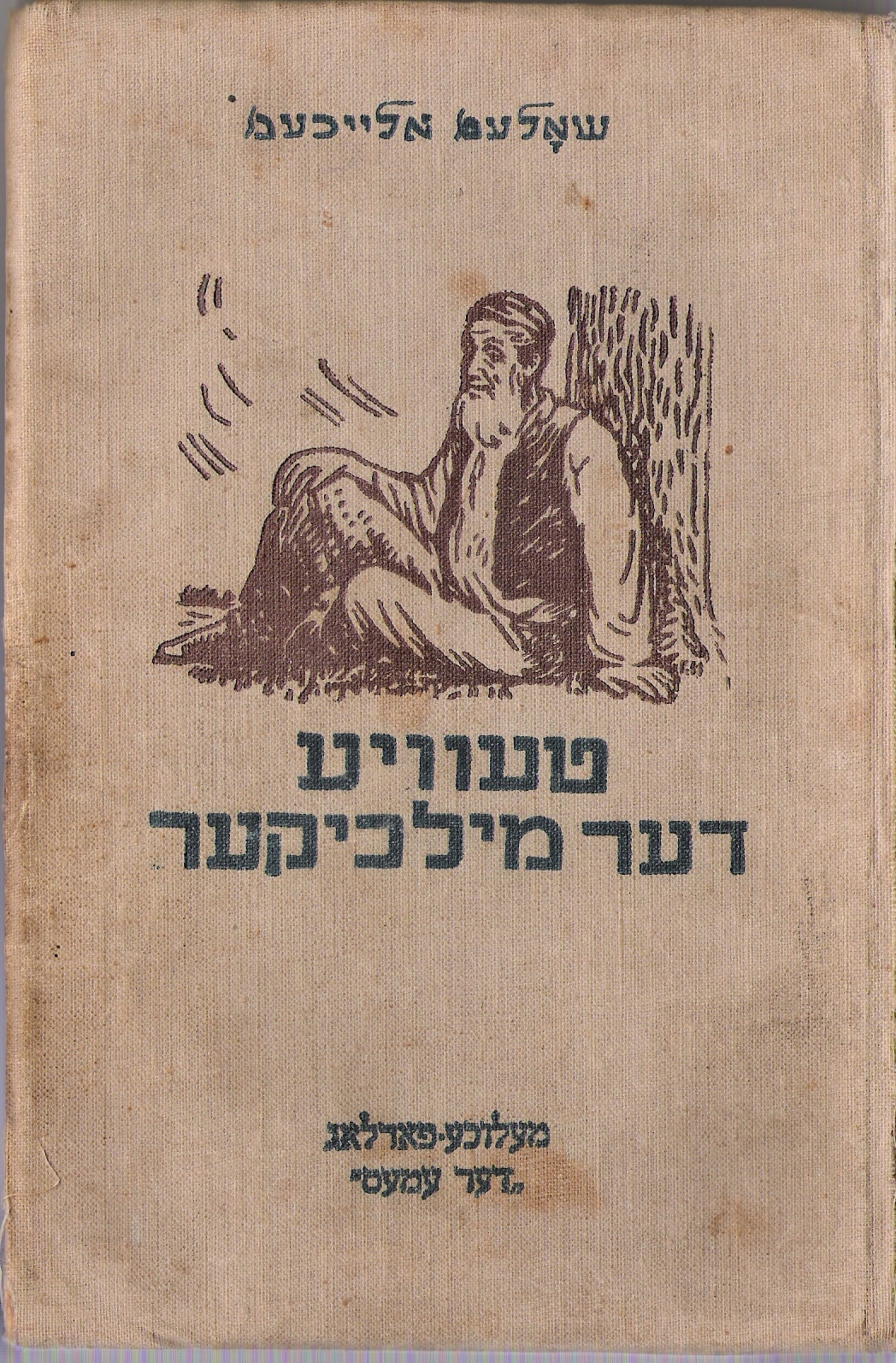
Cover of the 1930 Soviet edition of Tevye der milkhiker

The short story "Dos groyse gevins" published in 1903 was a rework of the short story "Tevye der milkhiker" written in 1894 and first published in 1895, in the historical-literary collection Der hoyz-fraynd ["House Friend"], vol.4, 1895, Mikhail Spektor publishing house, Warsaw. It was later included into the book Tevye the Milkman as its first short story. It was variously translated into English as "From Drayman to Dairyman", "The Grand Prize", "Tevye Strikes it Rich", "Tevye Wins a Fortune", or "The Great Windfall".

=== Plot sketch ===
The story is framed as Tevye's monologue.

Returning from dairy deliveries in Boiberik to his home village of Kasrilevke, Tevye meets two wealthy Jewish women who lost her way and reluctantly agrees to drive them home, back to Boiberik, where they have their summer dacha. The women and their relatives gave Tevye a generous tip and a wagonload of food.

== Dos groyse gevins (1915) ==
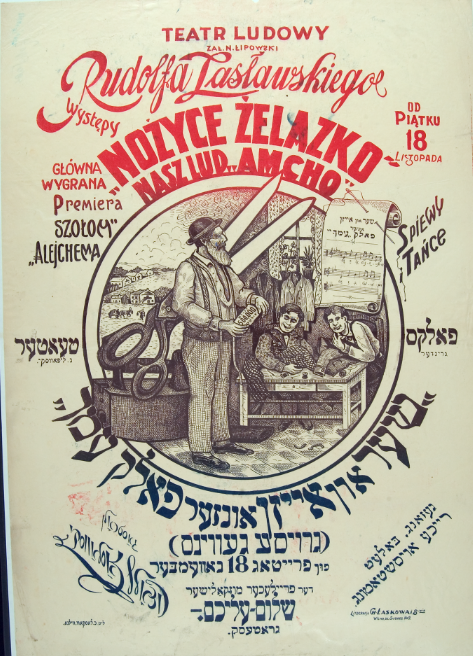
Polish/Yiddish poster for the play under the title Shears and Iron Our People "Amcho" (Note: The title of the Vilna production of the play comes from the last Shimele's cry "Amcho, sher un ayzn undzer folk!" ("Amcho, shears and iron our people!") Here "sher un ayzn" is a reference to common hard-working people)

The play was written in New York, in 1915. It was staged by a number of Yiddish troupes. The best known staging was probably by Aleksey Granovsky at the Moscow State Jewish Theatre in 1923, titled 200000 (1923).

In 1969 a German opera 200 000 Taler premiered, based on the play.

=== Plot sketch ===
A poor Jewish tailor Shimele Soroker from a small town in Russian Empire wins a 200,000 rubles jackpot.

=== 200000 ===
The role of Soroker was played by Solomon Mikhoels.
