= Haynt =

Historical Yiddish daily newspaper

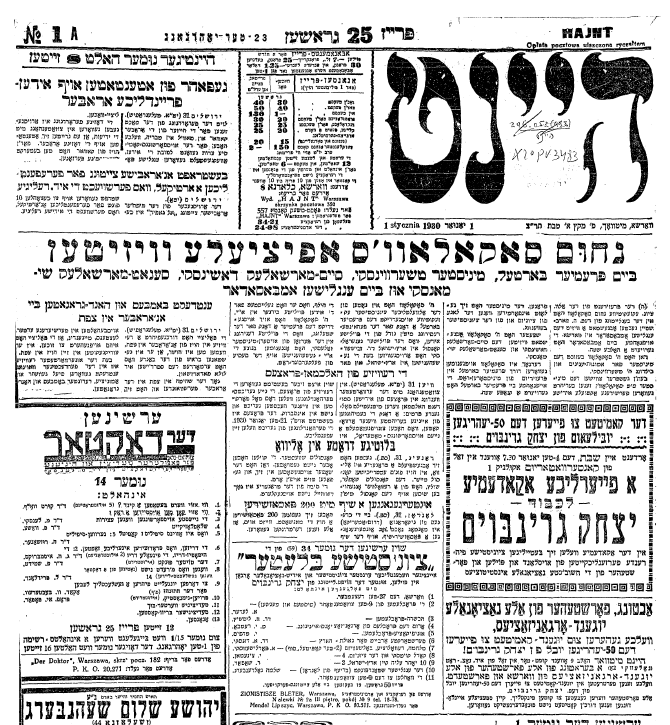
- Title page of Haynt, January 17, 1915
- Type: Daily newspaper
- Founder: Shmuel Yankev Yatskan
- Founded: 1906
- Ceased publication: 1939
- Language: Yiddish
- Country: Poland

Haynt (Yiddish: הײַנט - "Today"; Yidishes tageblat 1906-08) was a Yiddish daily newspaper, published in Warsaw from 1906 until 1939.

== History ==
The newspaper Yidishes tageblat (Yiddish: יידישעס טאגעבלאט) was founded in 1906 by Zionist Samuel Jackan, a former contributor to the Hebrew-language paper Ha-Tsefirah.

In 1908 Yidishes tageblat changed its name to Haynt and quickly established itself as the premier Yiddish newspaper in the Congress Poland.

== Circulation ==
The practice of reprinting Yiddish fiction in serialized form helped Haynt set new circulation records for Yiddish journalism. By 1913 the newspaper reached a circulation of more than 150,000 copies.

From 1908 till 1932 Haynt was a private company. In 1932 a cooperative called Alt-Nay was formed by the staff, who administered the newspaper ever since.

== Contributors ==
- Esriel Carlebach (Yiddish: עזריאל קארלעבאך), also under pseudonym Levi Gotthelf (Yiddish: לוי גאָטהעלף).
- Boris Smolar
- Moshe Sneh
- Sholem Aleichem, in particular, the second series of the exploits of Menahem-Mendl
