= Boris Smolar =

American author and journalist (1897–1986)

Boris "Ber" Smolar (May 27, 1897 – January 31, 1986) was a Ukrainian-born Jewish-American journalist and newspaper editor from New York.

== Life ==
Smolar was born on May 27, 1897, in Rovno, Volhynia Governorate, Russian Empire, the son of Leivia Smolar and Miriam Shearer.

Smolar received a secular-Hebrew education and learned Russian from his father, a Hebrew teacher. He graduated from a commercial course when he was thirteen and later worked as a bookkeeper in a manufacturer's office. His career in journalism began with correspondence pieces for the Warsaw paper Haynt. In 1915, he became a correspondent for the Moscow Russian-language journal Voina i Evrei. He travelled around the Eastern Front during World War I, and from 1916 to 1917 he published a series of articles called "Yudishe helder” (Jewish heroes) in the Odessa paper Unzer Leben to demonstrate Jewish soldiers' efforts in the war. He moved to Kazan following the 1917 Revolution, and he sat on the local council of worker and peasant deputies as a representative of the Bund. He also wrote for the local Russian papers. In 1918, he returned to Rivne and edited the Russian dailies Prigorinskii Krai and Naordnaia Slovo as well as the weekly Zarya. He was plenipotentiary of OZE (Society for the Protection of the Health of the Jewish Population) and director of its 24 children’s homes and schools in Volhynia. When Poland took over Rivne, he wrote a series of short stories called "Fun Ukrainishn Thom” (From the Ukrainian Abyss) for the Warsaw Moment.

Smolar immigrated to America in 1919. He attended the Medill School of Journalism in Northwestern University from 1920 to 1923 and Columbia University from 1925 to 1926. He worked on the editorial staff of Chicago dailies from 1921 to 1924 and The Forward from 1922 to 1924. He was manager of the Chicago Workmen's Circle and, together with Y. B. Beylin, Kalman Marmor, and Jacob Levin, published the monthly periodical Der Nayer Veg for the Workmen's Circle educational committee in 1921. He was also in charge of the Chicago weekly Der Idisher Rekord and contributed to the New York daily Di Tsayt. He moved to New York City in 1924. He then worked as a European correspondent for the Jewish Telegraphic Agency (JTA) from 1924 to 1928 and was a roving reporter for the New York World. He was editor-in-chief of the JTA from 1928 to 1967.

In 1928, Smolar received permission from the Soviet Union to establish a JTA office in Moscow. He was its first correspondent there, at a time when only six American correspondents were permitted in the Soviet Union, and provided a pipeline of information on the lifestyles and problems of Soviet Jews. His coverage provided insight into areas closed to foreigners like Siberia and Turkestan as well as Jewish agricultural colonies in Crimea that were supported by the Agro-Joint. In 1928, he intervened with Soviet authorities to release Saadieh Mazeh, son of the former Chief Rabbi of Moscow Yaakov Mazeh, from jail and to let him leave the country with his wife and children. In 1930, he intervened to release fourteen rabbis that were arrested in Minsk. Following a personal meeting with Commissar for Religious Affairs Pyotr Smidovich, it was decided by the Yevsektsiya, the Jewish section of the Communist Party, that Jewish agricultural workers would be allowed to do their one day of free collective service on a day other than Yom Kippur, the scheduled day for 1930. His dispatches on Russia's "declassed" Jews, who were deprived of their rights following a decree from Stalin, led to the intervention of American officials, a reversal of the policy, and the dissolution of the Yevsektsiya. He never interviewed Stalin directly, but Stalin responded to written questions with a strong condemnation of anti-Semitism that was published worldwide in 1931, although the Soviet press didn't publish it until 1936.

Smolar covered Romanian pogroms in 1930, which resulted in the resignation of the notorious anti-Semitic Interior Minister Alexandru Vaida-Voevod. He was assigned to Berlin in 1932, just before the Nazis came to power. He was among the first to predict Hitler's ascension and to warn of the grave menace German Jews faced under the new regime. He remained at his post at great personal risk, with the Gestapo harassing him while reporting on news that affected the country's Jewish community. In 1937, the Nazis expelled him from Germany for "endangering the interests of the Reich" with his comprehensive reporting of what was happening to Jews in Germany. He reported from Romania in 1937, when extreme anti-Semites Octavian Goga and A. C. Cuza took over the government and caused a panic in the Jewish community. He spent years covering the Mandatory Palestine, reporting on the 1929 riots and knowing various major Zionist leaders like Chaim Weizmann and Ze'ev Jabotinsky. In 1940, he provided an affidavit to allow Jabotinsky's son Eri Jabotinsky to leave Nazi-occupied France with his fiancee. He was in the United Nations when they voted on the 1947 United Nations Partition Plan for Palestine, which he later described as "one of the most sacred moments of my life." He retired as editor-in-chief of the JTA in 1967 and was named editor-in-chief emeritus, although he continued to write a weekly column for the JTA called "Between You and Me" until a month before his death and wrote a column for The Forward.

Smolar wrote a number of books in Yiddish and Hebrew as well as In the Service of My People and Soviet Jewry Today and Tomorrow in English. He received numerous citations and awards, including the Bronze Peace Medal and Silver Shekel Medal from Israel and the Amoris Alumna Pax Medal from Pope Paul VI. The Council of Jewish Federations and Welfare Funds established the Smolar Award for Excellence in Jewish Journalism.

Smolar died in Roosevelt Hospital from a long illness on January 31, 1986. His wife Genia died 15 hours beforehand in the same hospital.
