= Marie Waife =

American writer (1892–1985)

- Born: Marusi Solomonovna Rabinovich (also tr. Rabinowitz); October 29, 1892; Odessa, Russian Empire
- Died: November 30, 1985 (aged 93); White Plains, New York
- Other name: Marie Waife-Goldberg
- Known for: Writing
- Spouse: Benjamin Waife (m. 1917; died 1972)
- Father: Sholem Aleichem

Marie Waife (née Marusi Solomonovna Rabinovich; 29 October 1892 – 30 November 1985) was an American writer best known for writing the 1968 biography, My Father, Sholem Aleichem, about the brilliant Yiddish author and playwright.

== Biography ==
Marie Waife was born in Odessa, Russian Empire (now Ukraine), in 1892, as the fifth child of Sholem Aleichem and his wife Olga (née Loyeva). She lived in various locations throughout Europe including Switzerland, Germany, and Italy due to financial insecurity until 1914, when she and her family migrated to the United States, residing on the Lower East Side of New York City.

She married the writer and journalist Benjamin Waife (known by his pen name Ben Zion Goldberg) in 1917 and had two sons: Sholom and Mitchell. In 1968, Waife published a biography of her father titled My Father, Sholem Aleichem, the first complete biography of the famous writer. She was known for holding meetings at her New York residence on the anniversary of Aleichem's death to read his works. Waife died in 1985 and was survived by her sons.
