= Yosele Solovey =

1889 novel by Sholem Aleichem

Yosele Solovey (Yiddish: יאָסעלע סאָלאָוויי) (Note: "Yosele" is a diminutive of Yosef (Joseph)) is an 1886 Yiddish novel by Sholem Aleichem, the bildungsroman of a young boy with a beautiful voice, which earned him the nickname "solovey", meaning "nightingale" in Russian. It was translated into English for the first time by Aliza Shevrin in 1985, under the title The Nightingale (full title: "The Nightingale, or The Saga of Yosele Solovey the Cantor"

In the dedication, Sholem Aleichem writes that the novel was written in 1886 and that it was his second novel. It is one of Sholem Aleichem's three novels about musicians, the other two being Stempenyu (Note: Accidentally or not, the real name of the real Stempenyu was Iosif (Yosele) Druker.) and Wandering Stars.

Yosele lives in a fictional Ukrainian shtetl of Mazepevke/Mazepovka. (Note: Mazepevke (not the Russian Mazepovka) is a fictional shtetl found in some other author's works, such as Stempenyu, Moshkeleh the Thief, or The Clock, first appearing in the 1893 feuilleton "Stantsye Mazepevke" [Mazepevke Station].) Aliza Shevrin, the translator of the novel, characterises Yosele as follows:

"...an artist in whom rages the conflict between the demands of religion and the temptations of secular life. He is an innocent enough young man, just a touch curious, just a bit greedy, just a little irresponsible. This Yosele is pure Sholom Aleichem, a lovable, if all too human, being"

Superficially the novel looks like a melodrama. The hero is in love with an idealized shtetl woman, his childhood friend Esther, but eventually falls in the hands of a rich and practical woman, madame Perele, and marries her (Stempenyu had a similar predicament). In the end, when Yosele learns about the marriage of Esther, he becomes a madman. However the three novels have a significant focus on the society, rather than on the heroes and includes significant critique of the society.
