= Catriel (given name) =

Catriel is a masculine given name. Notable people with the name include:

- Catriel, a Native American, the namesake of the city of Catriel, Argentina
- Catriel Cabellos, Argentina-born professional footballer
- Catriel Guerreiro, Argentinian musician from the Ca7riel & Paco Amoroso duo
- Catriel Soto (born 1987), Argentine cyclist
- Catriel Sánchez (born 1998), Argentine footballer
- Catriel Orcellet (born 1978), Argentine footballer

== See also ==
- Katriel
