= Katriel =

Katriel, Kasriel, or Casriel is a personal name. It may be Hebrew-language given name and surname כתריאל, meaning "God is my crown" or "God surrounds and supports me". The name of the fictional shtetl of Kasrilevka ultimately originated from it. "Katriel" may also be an alternate spelling of the name Catriel of Argentine origin. Notable people with the name include:

== Given name ==
- Kasriel Broydo (1907–1945), Lithuanian songwriter, singer, and coupletist
- Casriel Dovid Kaplin (1931–2006), rabbi and a dayan in the London Beth Din
- Katriel Hidalgo (born 1995), Bolivian actor, director, and playwright
- Kasriel Hirsch Sarasohn (1835–1905), American journalist who published several newspapers in New York
- Katriel Katz (1908–1988), Israeli diplomat
- Katriel Schory (born 1947), Israeli film producer, director of the Israeli Film Foundation (1999-2019)

== Surname ==
- Daniel Harold Casriel (1924–1983), American psychiatrist, psychoanalyst and writer
- Tamar Katriel (born 1947), Israeli communications and cultural researcher
