= Rechytsa =

Town in Gomel Region, Belarus

Rechytsa Рэчыца (Belarusian) Речица (Russian)
- Town
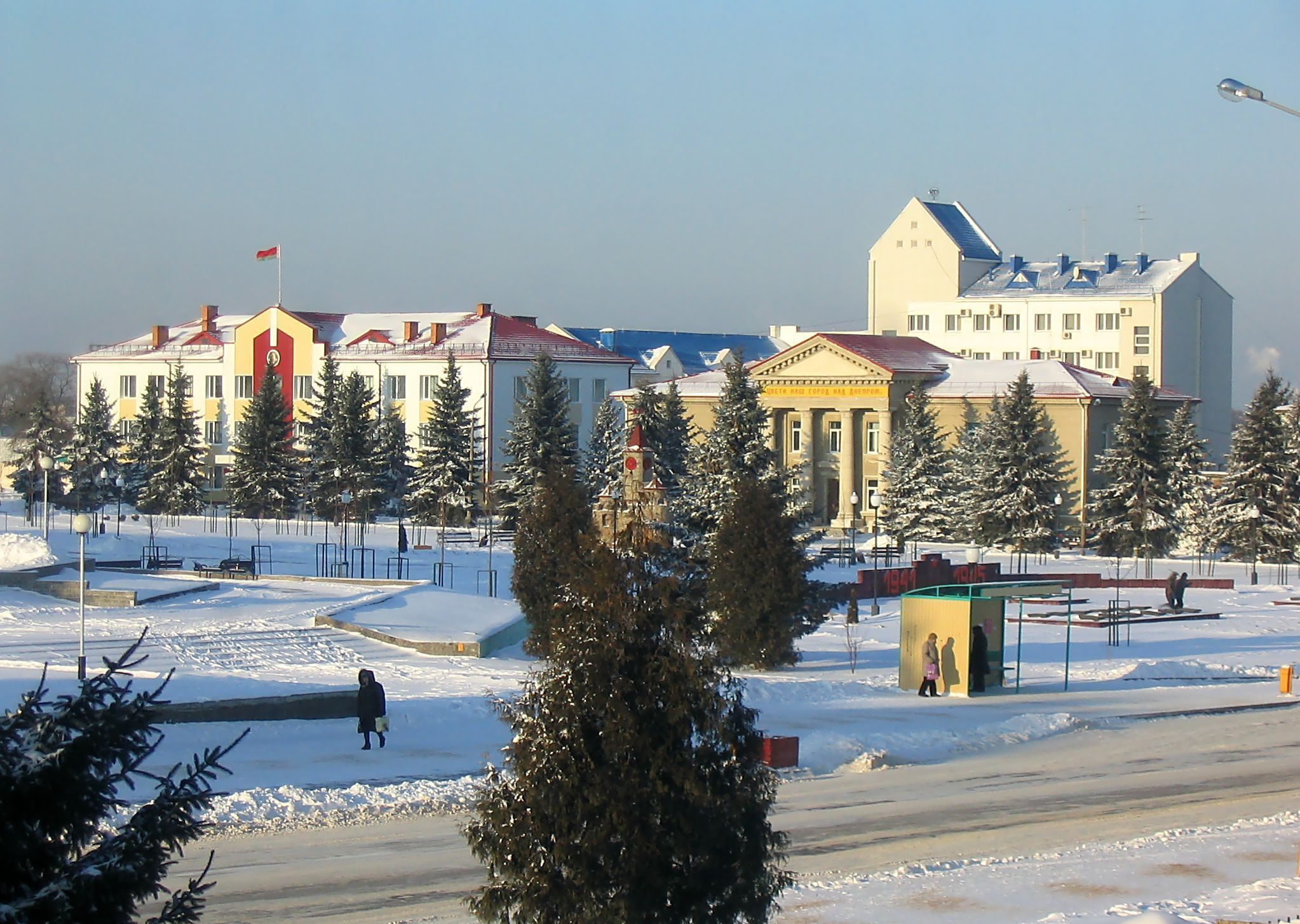
- Rechytsa town centre, Kastrychnitskaya (October) Square

- Flag Coat of arms
- Interactive map of Rechytsa
- Location within Belarus
- Coordinates: 52°22′00″N 30°24′00″E
- Country: Belarus
- Region: Gomel Region
- District: Rechytsa District
- Founded: 1213

Area
  - Total: 29.4 km^{2} (11.4 sq mi)
- Elevation: 128 m (420 ft)

Population (2025)
  - Total: 64,733
  - Density: 2,200/km^{2} (5,700/sq mi)
- Time zone: UTC+3 (MSK)
- Postal code: 247500
- Area code: +375 2340
- License plate: 3
- Website: rechitsa.gov.by (in Russian)

Rechytsa or Rechitsa (Belarusian: Рэчыца, romanized: Rechyca, IPA: [ˈrɛtʂɨtsa]; Russian: Речица; Polish: Rzeczyca) is a town in Gomel Region, Belarus. It serves as the administrative center of Rechytsa District. The town is located on the Rechytsa River, which flows into the Dnieper. In 2020, its population was 66,400. As of 2025, it has a population of 64,733.

== History ==
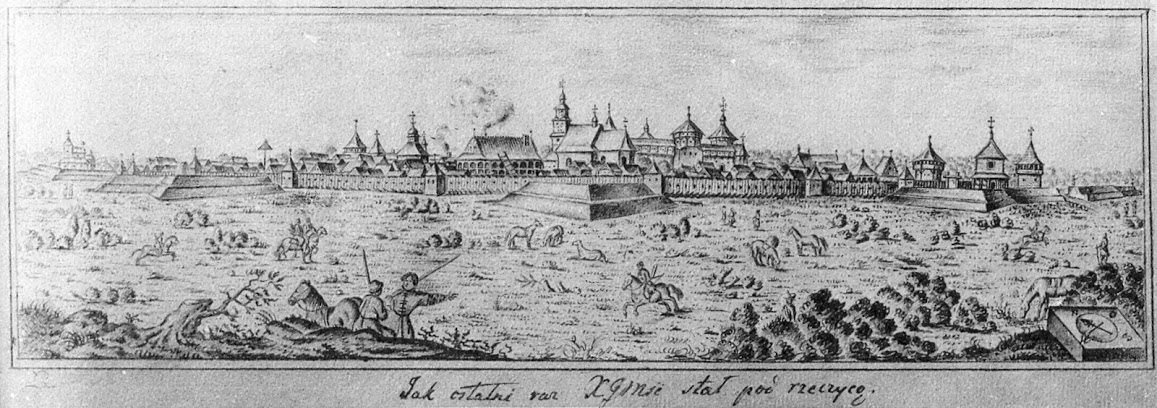
Rechitsa. An engraving of Abraham van Westerveld, mid-17th century.

Rechytsa is one of the oldest towns in Belarus. First settlements in this region are dated back to the epoch of mesolite (9 – 5th centuries B.C.). Later, this area was inhabited by the Dregovichi tribe. The town was first mentioned in the Novgorod chronicle in 1213 as a town of the Principality of Chernigov. Rechytsa was also ruled by Kiev and Turov Grand Dukes. At the time of Gediminas reign (1311–1341) the town was annexed to the Grand Duchy of Lithuania, from 1385 forming part of the Polish–Lithuanian union. Rečyca as well as Orsha, Shklow, Mogilev, Stary Bychaw and Rahachow formed a well-developed frontier defense system at the River Dniepr.

1392–1430 – the reign of Grand Duke Vytautas. He constructed a fortified castle with five towers in the area of the detinets (old Belarusian for the downtown) on the bank of the Dniepr. At that time the town had three fortification lines in the form of water trenches and ramparts with bastions. In the area between the fortress and the second fortification line there was a territory for rich mansions, Church of the Order of Friars Preachers and a trade square. The town inhabitants settled lived between the second and third fortification lines. The construction of the town had clear right-angled forms.

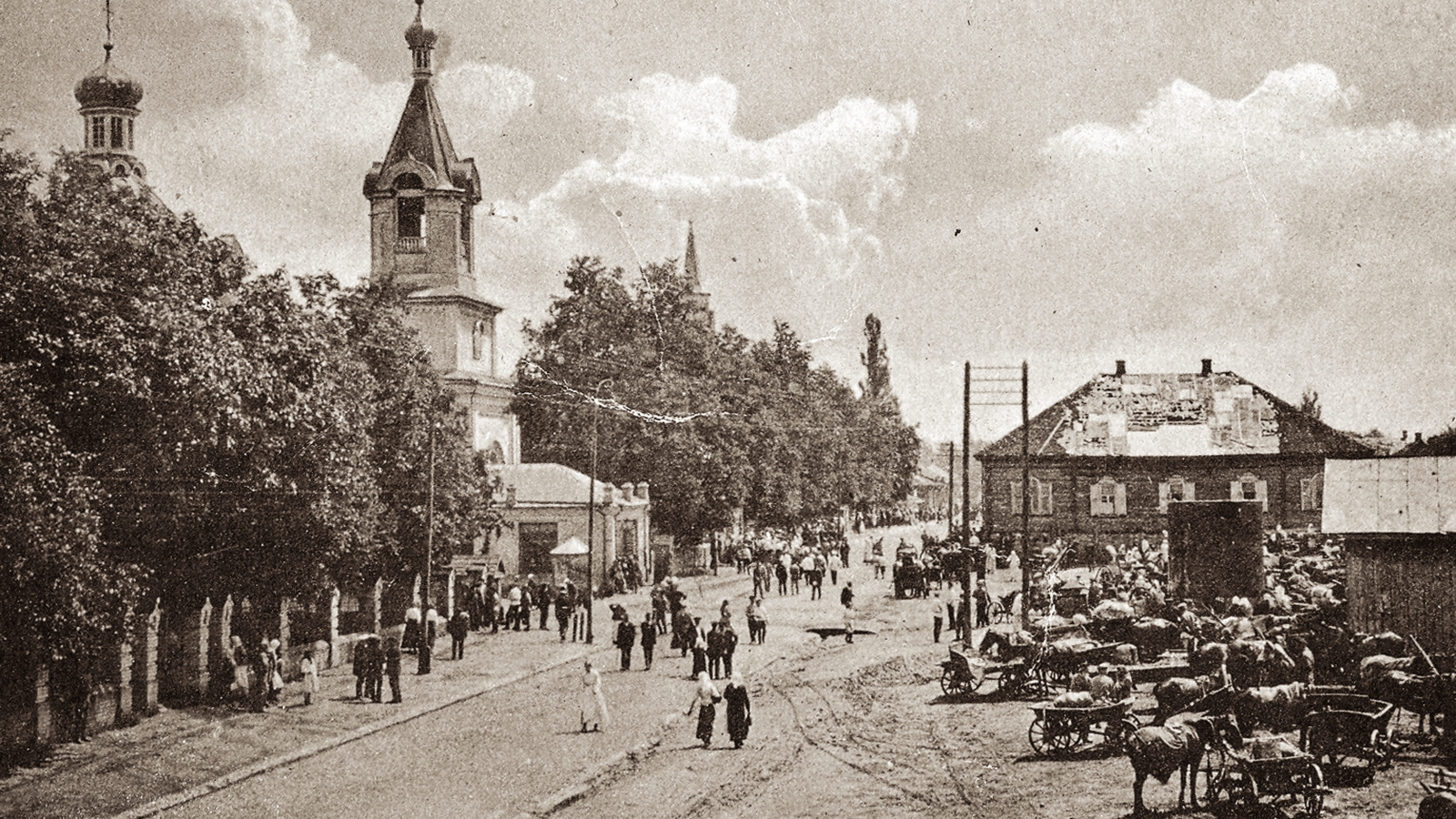
A local market in 1910

In 1561 the town was partially granted Magdeburg rights by Sigismund II Augustus. Within the Polish–Lithuanian Commonwealth, it was a county seat in the Minsk Voivodeship. The town was practically destroyed during the Cossack war of 1648–1651. After the Truce of Andrusovo it was restored to the Polish–Lithuanian Commonwealth. It was annexed by Russia in the Second Partition of Poland in 1793. It then became an uyezd seat in the newly formed Minsk Governorate.

The first permanent town plan of Rechytsa was approved in 1800. During the Napoleonic Wars in 1812 the town was a temporary residence of the Minsk governor. The town was occupied by Napoleon's Army in some of 1812, fought over by Whites and Reds during the Russian Civil War of 1917–1922, occupied by Central Powers in 1917–1918, and temporarily controlled by Poland in 1920 during the Polish–Soviet War. From 1922 it formed part of the Soviet Union. It was under German occupation during World War II in 1941–1943/4. The Germans operated a Nazi prison in the town.

=== Jewish community ===
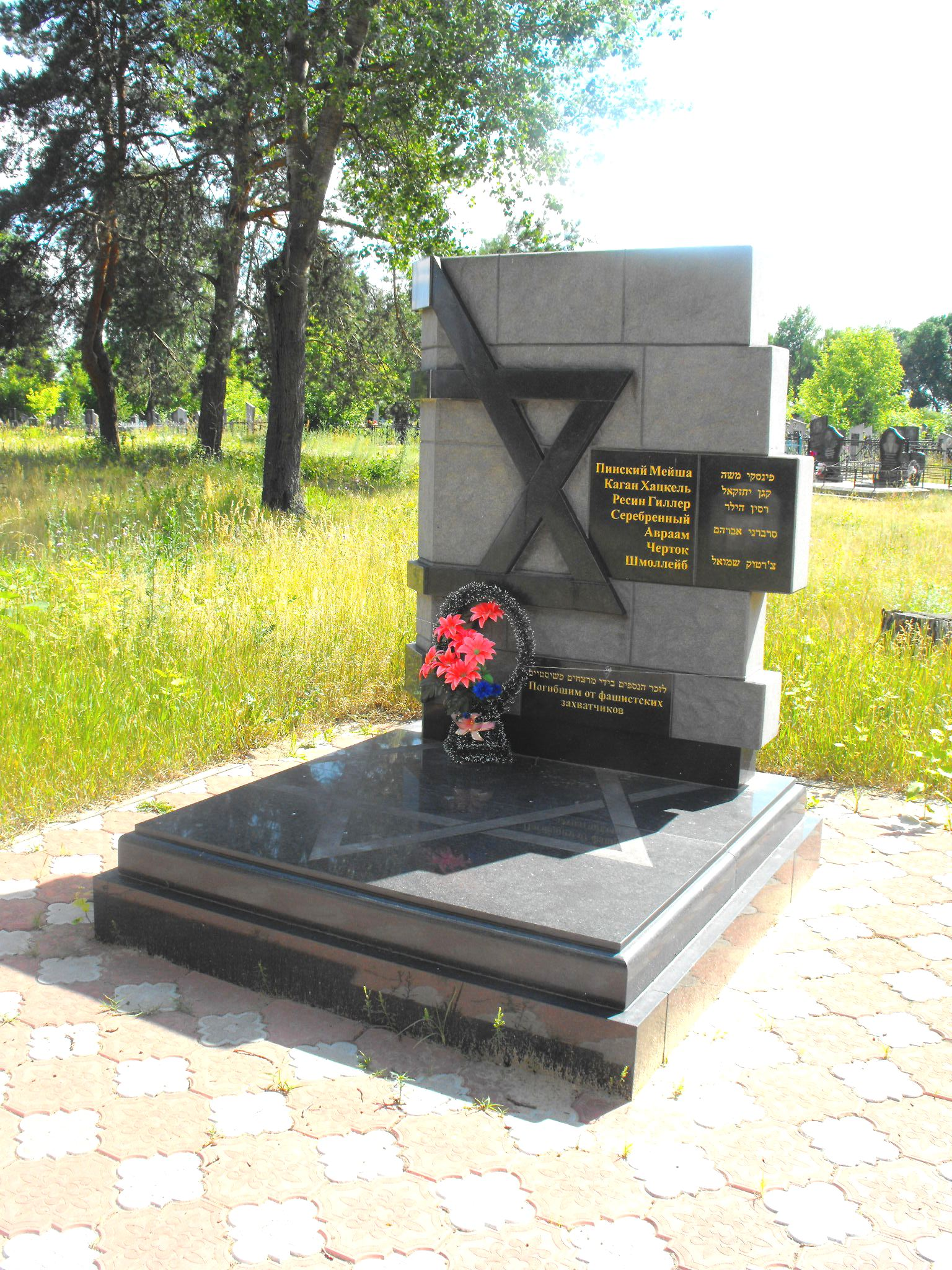
Memorial to local Jews murdered in the Holocaust

Rechytsa had one of the oldest Jewish communities in Belarus, and later the town was a center for Chabad Hasidic Jews. In 1648, Cossacks murdered many of its Jews. The town's Jewish population in 1766 numbered 133, increasing to 1,268 in 1800 (two-thirds of the total population), and 2,080 in 1847. By 1897 the town's Jewish population grew to 5,334, which constituted 57 percent of the general population. On the eve of World War I the Jewish population is thought to have numbered some 7,500.

Rabbi Shalom Dovber Schneersohn of Rechitsa (d. 1908) led the Kapust branch of the Chabad movement until his death in 1908.

==== World War II ====
During World War II, the Germans occupied the town on 23 August 1941, and in November, all 3,000 remaining Jews were gathered in a ghetto. On 25 November, the ghetto was liquidated by the Nazis. Following the war, a part of the surviving community returned to Rechytsa. Despite not having a synagogue, in 1970 the Jewish population was estimated at 1,000. In the 1990s, most of the town's Jews emigrated to Israel and the West.

=== Recent history ===
During the Russian invasion of Ukraine, Rechytsa became an important base for Russian troops. Before the invasion, a buildup of troops near Rechytsa was recorded on video and circulated on social media. Local residents said the Russian military had been unloading weapons on train platforms there and had commandeered at least two abandoned factories.

== Demographics ==
=== Population ===
- early 1900s? – 1,770
- 2005 – 65,500
- 2006 – 65,400
- 2007 – 65,300
- 2010 – 64,700
- 2023 – 65,423
- 2024 – 65,213

== Nature and ecology ==
Rechitsa is located on the territory affected by the accident at the Chernobyl Nuclear Power Plant.

== Economics ==
Rechytsa products are well known in the CIS member-states as well as in other countries. Rechytsa produces watercraft, furniture, and beer, which are exported to England, Germany, the Netherlands, Sweden and several African countries. "Rechitsaneft" is oil and gas production department of "Belarusneft". Was established in 1965. Main activities: oil and natural gas production, development of oil and gas field.

== Sights ==
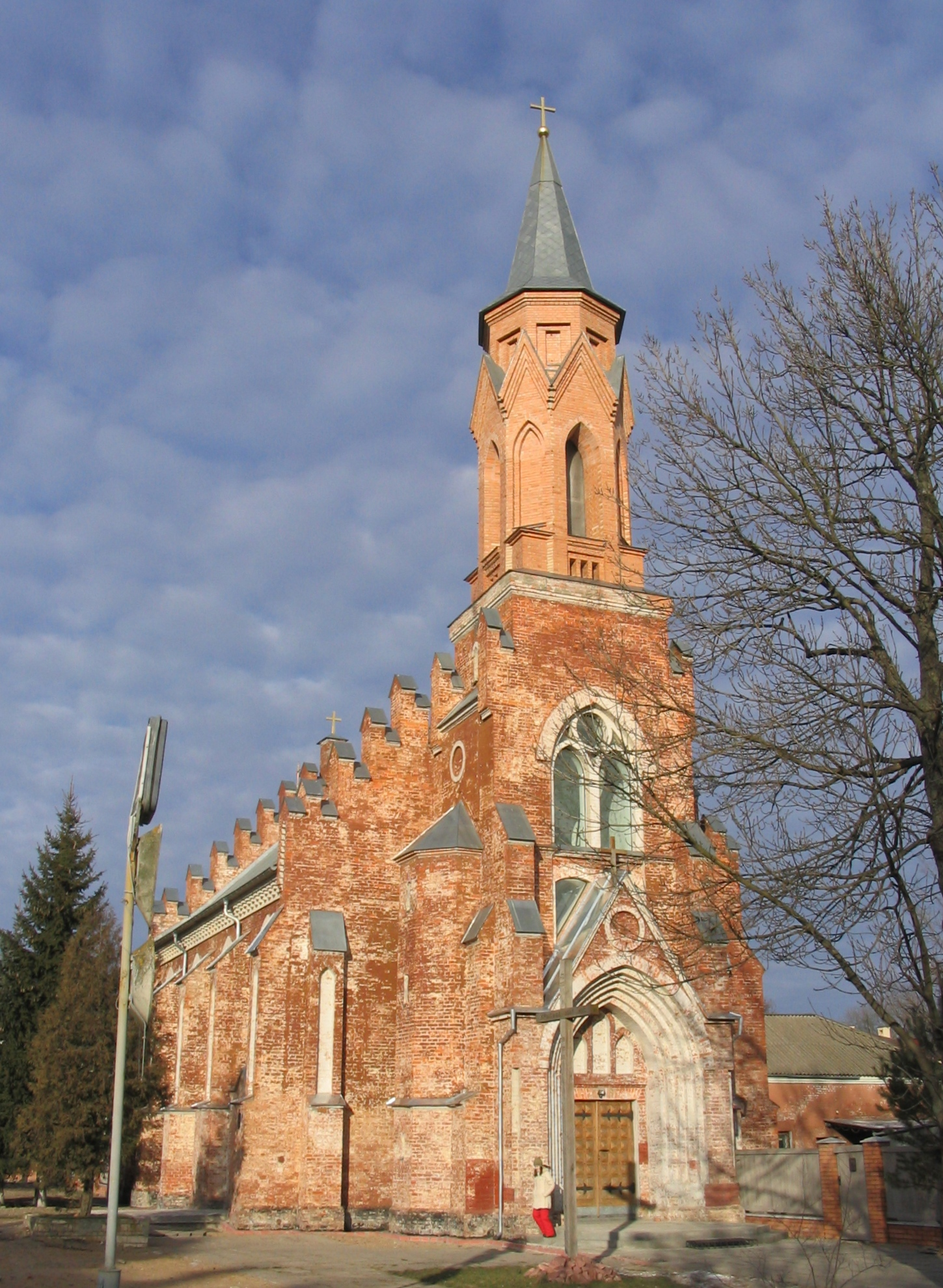
Holy Trinity Catholic church

Settlement

It is located in the Children's Park, on the right bank of the Dnieper, and is marked with a commemorative sign with a memorial plate, which reads: "Monument of archeology. Settlement".
This is a rectangular platform measuring 75 × 45 m, reinforced from the western, eastern and southern sides by two-meter-high ramparts. The settlement is washed by the river from the north. From its western and eastern sides there are deep ditches, which in ancient times were filled with water.

Holy Trinity Church
This temple, erected at the beginning of the 20th century, is one of the most plastically expressive monuments of neo-Gothic architecture in Belarus. Its side facades are rhythmically divided by buttresses and lancet window openings. On the main facade there is a stepped portal. The motif of decoration with teeth is widely used. The main accent of the building is the belfry of the Church, which rises above the rest, and its multifaceted spire, crowned with a cross, seems to crash into the sky. Lancet arches and ribbed vaults inside the building made the interior high, light and airy.

Holy Dormition Cathedral

The shrine has a long and complicated history. This church was preceded by the wooden Church of the Resurrection built in 1079, which was considered a cathedral from 1794 until 1872, and in 1876 it was dismantled and moved to the cemetery.

Chapel of St. Euphrosyne of Polotsk
The chapel was erected on the high bank of the Dnieper in a historical place - where in 1910 the procession stopped, following with the relics of St. Euphrosyne from Kiev to Polotsk. 85 years later, the consecration of the chapel took place here with the Holy Fire from the Holy Sepulcher, delivered to Rechitsa by the scientific and creative expedition "The Road to Shrines", which went through the return of the holy relics of the heavenly patroness of White Russia from the Holy Land to their homeland.

Monument to M. V. Dovnar-Zapolsky
In 2003, thanks to the help of the Rechitsa City Executive Committee, the publishing house "Belarus" in Minsk published Mitrofan Viktorovich Dovnar-Zapolsky's fundamental work "History of Belarus" with comments by modern experts. And even earlier, on July 2, 1997, on the 130th anniversary of the birth of their famous countryman, the inhabitants of the city erected a monument to him (sculptor V. Yanushkevich, author of the project E. Agunovich).

Monument "Rechytsy sons who died far away hell Radzima"
The monument was erected in 2003 in honor of seven fellow countrymen who died in military conflicts outside their homeland. The basis of the composition of the monument (sculptor V. Slobodchikov, author of the project E. Agunovich) is seven storks falling down. Having stretched out their necks and folded their wings, they doomedly fly one after another into a crevice between granite blocks, symbolizing Islamic fundamentalism.

== Notable people ==
- Alexander Arkatov (1890–1961), Russian Jewish film director and playwright
- Mitrofan Dovnar-Zapolsky (1867–1934), historian, ethnographer, diplomat, supporter of the Belarusian Democratic Republic
- Michel Kikoine (1892–1968), painter
- Vasil Kiryienka (born 1981), former racing cyclist
- Yefim Kopelyan (1912–1975), actor
- Vladimir Matyushenko (born 1971), mixed martial artist
