= It's Hard to be a Jew =

Yiddish comedic play by Sholom Aleichem

It's Hard to be a Jew (Yiddish: Shver tsu zayn a yid) is a Yiddish-language comedy play by Sholom Aleichem about the difficulty of Jewish-Gentile relationships in the Russian Empire. Written in 1914, it was premiered at The Yiddish Art Theatre, Second Avenue, New York on 1 October 1920, and revived in 1949. The play was adapted at the Eden Theater in 1973 with new melodies by Sholom Secunda.
