= 200 000 Taler =

1969 opera by Boris Blacher

200 000 Taler is an opera by Boris Blacher after Sholem Aleichem's 1915 play Dos groyse gevins (The big win) about tailor Schimele Soroker and his family after he comes to great fortune by winning the lottery. The opera was premiered at the Deutsche Oper Berlin on 25 September 1969.

== Roles ==
- Schimele Soroker, a tailor (baritone)
- Ettie-Mennie, his wife (mezzo-soprano)
- Bailke, his daughter (soprano)
- Motel, assistant (tenor)
- Kopel, assistant (baritone)
- Perl, neighbor (soprano)
- Solomon, landlord (bass)
- Koltun, businessman (baritone)
- Solovejchik, matchmaker (tenor)
- Himmelfarb, bank clerk (tenor)
- Mendel, domestic worker (bass)
- Reb Ascher Fein, a rich man (mime artist)
- Golda, his wife (pantomime)

== Recordings ==
- 1970 Martha Mödl, Günter Reich, Dorothea Weiß. Orchester der Deutschen Oper Berlin conducted by Heinrich Hollreiser, director Rudolf Sellner. Arthaus DVD. Recording of the premiere production
