= Voronkiv, Kyiv Oblast =

Coordinates: 50°13′21″N 30°54′00″E

Voronkiv (Ukrainian: Вороньків; Yiddish: װאָראָנקאָ, Voronko) is a rural settlement in northern Ukraine, located in Boryspil Raion of Kyiv Oblast. It serves as the centre of Voronkiv rural hromada.

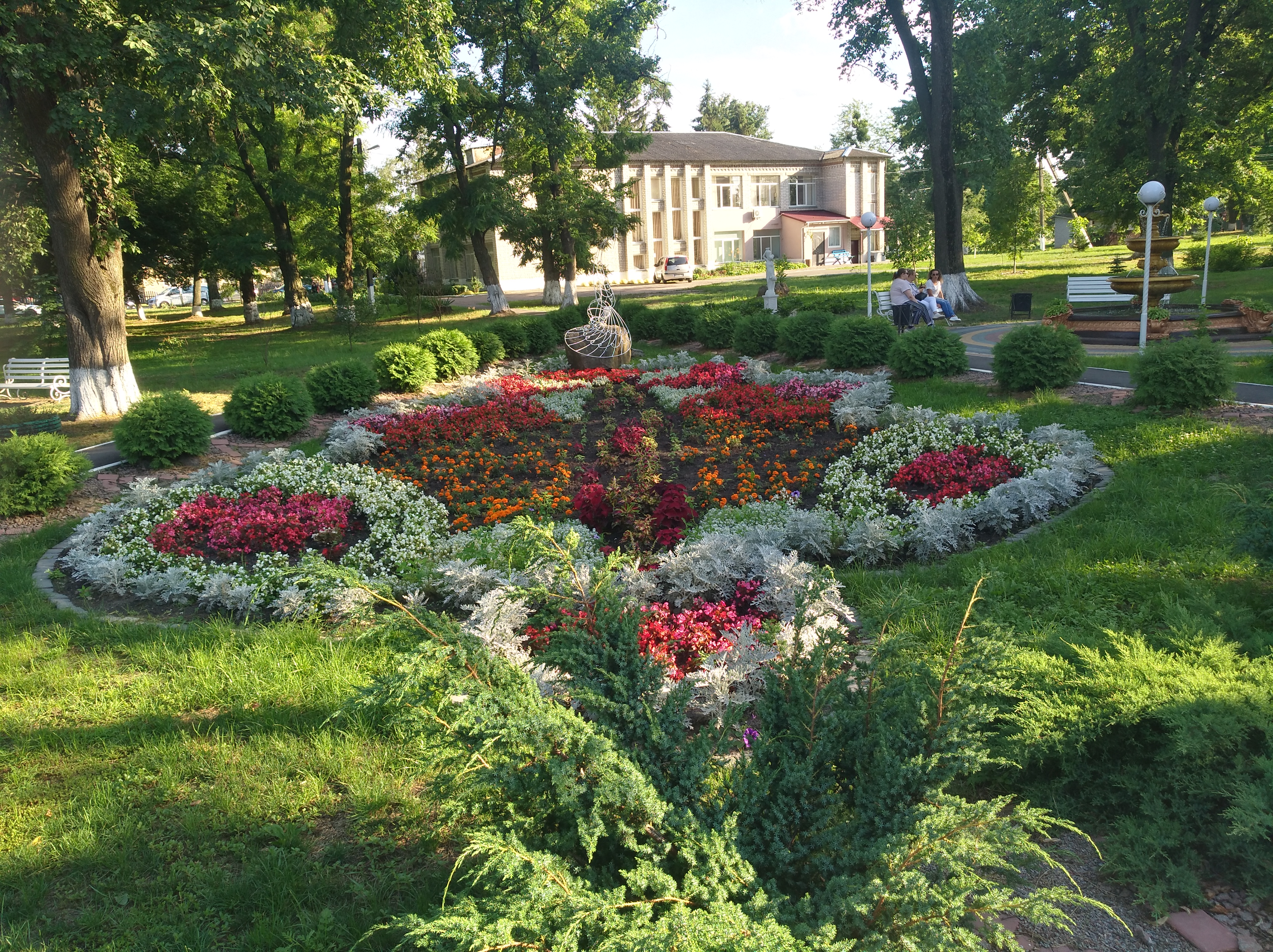
Voronkiv central square, July 2023

== History ==
The Olizar family inherited this village and the surrounding lands, then later leased it to Sophia Teofila Danylovychivna, leading to many legal court proceedings surrounding the ownership of the village.

During the Holodomor, this village, like many others throughout Ukraine, experienced widespread hunger, leading to numerous deaths from starvation.

Famed Yiddish writer Sholem Aleichem (1859–1916), who was born in the nearby Pereiaslav, grew up in Voronkiv. Voronkiv served as the inspiration for Aleicham's fictional shtetl of Kasrilevka.
