= Stempenyu: A Jewish Novel =

1888 novel by Sholem Aleichem

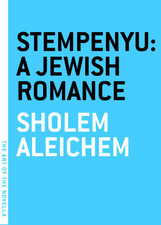
- The 2008 translation book cover
- Author: Sholem Aleichem
- Published: 1888
- Media type: Print

Stempenyu: A Jewish Novel (Yiddish: סטעמפּעניו, romanized: Stempenyu, A Yidisher Roman) is an 1888 Yiddish language novel by Sholem Aleichem based loosely on the life of klezmer violinist Stempenyu. It his first novel and remained one of his most popular; it was reprinted multiple times and adapted into various stage and film versions, including a play with music composed by Joseph Achron and one adapted by Sholem Aleichem himself for Boris Thomashefsky's theatre.

The novel says that name of the title character comes from nickname of his father, Stempener, after the village of Stempeni "not far from Mazepevke", from which his father Berl hailed.

The novel is dedicated to Mendele Mocher Sforim to whom the author wrote a letter with the dedication, addressing to Mendele "dear grandfather".

The novel was adapted in 1905 as the play Jewish Daughters (Yidishe Tekhter). Although the play had been performed in England before, its first-ever English-language production (as opposed to Yiddish) didn't take place until March 2025, which was a student production in the ADC theatre in the University of Cambridge.

It is one of the three Sholem Aleichem's novels about artists, the other two being Yosele Solovey and Wandering Stars.

== Plot ==
Stempenyu is an exceptionally talented itinerant klezmer violinist who seduces a woman in every town he visits. In one town, while playing at a wedding, he is attracted to one of the guests, Rachel, a talented singer. She, discontented with her marriage to the boring Moyshe-Mendl, finds herself drawn in by Stempenyu's music, who likewise finds his love for her an escape from his jealous and miserly wife Freydl. Stempenyu sends Rachel an almost illiterate love letter; she agrees to meet him, ostensibly to chide him for writing it but also because she is fascinated by him. However, a vision of her friend Chaya-Etel, who had been married against her will and then died, appears and she flees. She and her husband move to a different town, where they have a child and he becomes a successful businessman; Stempenyu and Freydl remain unhappily married and childless, though she also becomes a successful shopkeeper.
