= Kasrilevka =

Fictional shtetl

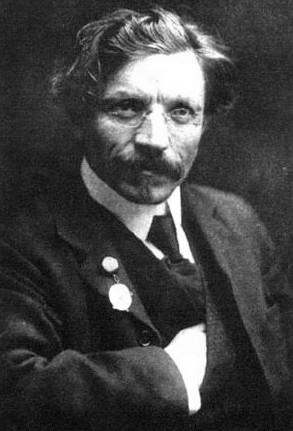
Sholem Aleichem

Kasrilevka (Yiddish: כתרילעווקע, romanized: Kasrilevke) is a fictional shtetl introduced by Yiddish author Sholem Aleichem. Located "exactly in the middle of that blessed Pale", it is an idealized town of "little Jews" (kleyne mentshelekh), who met their misfortunes with humor and the ultimate belief in justice. It has become an archetype shtetl. Other famous imaginary places of Sholem Aleichem are Yehupetz (for Kyiv) and Boiberik (for Boiarka). The latter gave the name to Camp Boiberik.

== Description ==
The name of the shtetl is derived from the Yiddish word kasril / kasrilik, an optimistic pauper, as Sholem Aleichem wrote: "However, there is still another name – kasril, or kasrilik. That name is spoken in a different tone altogether, almost a bragging tone. For instance, 'Oh, am I ever a kasrilik!' A kasrilik is not just an ordinary pauper, a failure in life. On the contrary, he is a man who has not allowed poverty to degrade him. He laughs at it. He is poor, but cheerful." Dan Miron remarks that this term is based on the Hebrew name Kasril (Modern Hebrew: כתריאל, Katriel, "God is my crown" or "God surrounds and supports me").

The prototype of Kasrilevka was the Ukrainian town of Voronkov of the Russian Empire (now the village Voronkiv, Ukraine), where Sholem Aleichem grew up.

Kasrilevka continues the tradition of humorous Jewish towns, such as the fictional Chelm of the "Wise Men of Chelm" popularized by Isaac Bashevis Singer and Kabtzansk (Note: "Kabtzansk" is loosely meaning "Pauperville", from Yiddish: קבצנ, "pauper", "beggar") of Mendele Mocher Sforim.

A detailed glimpse at Voronkov, the prototype of Kasrilevka, may be found in Funem Yarid: lebns-bashraybungen (Yiddish: פונעם יאריד, Back from the Fair: Descriptions of Life, 1915), Sholem Aleichem's unfinished autobiographical novel. Still, Funem Yarid describes not a real Voronkov, but something resembling Kasrilevka. Dan Miron makes a comparison of the real Voronkov from the memoir My Brother Sholom Aleichem of writer's brother Wolf Rabinovich, with its fictionalized image.

== Stories involving Kasrilevka ==
Early Sholem Aleichem's feuilletons published in Dos Yidishe Folksblat in 1886-1887 anticipated Kasrilevke.

Kasrilevke is the place for numerous author's novellas, short stories, sketches and plays and its description, rich in detail, was a considerable part of his work.

- Dreyfus in Kasrilevke (1902)
- A Yom Kippur Scandal
- Motl, Peysi the Cantor's Son
- The Town of the Little People
- Kasrilevka was the title of the 1935 collection of Sholem Aleichem's stories printed in Yiddish in Moscow
- "Der Zeyger" (1900; "The Clock That Struck Thirteen," 1900)
- "Kasrilevker Tramvay," "Kasrilevker Hoteln," "Kasrilevker Restoranen," "Kasrilevker Vayn un Kasrilevker Shikirim," "Kasrilevker Teater," "Kasrilevker Sreyfes," and "Kasrilevker Banditn" ("Tram," "Hotels," "Restaurants," "Wine and Drunkards," "Theater," "Fires," "Bandits,") collected in English as A Guide to Kasrilevke, 1973)
- "Ven Ikh Bin Roytshild" (1902; "If I Were Rothschild", 1979)
- "Oysgetreyselt" (1902; "A Yom Kippur Scandal," 1979)
- Inside Kasrilevke translated by Isidore Goldstick (1948) includes:
  - Dos Naye Kasrilevke (New Kasrilevka)
  - Kasrilevke Nisrofim (Kasrilevke Fire Victims)
  - Kasrilevke Moshav Z'kenim (Home for the Aged in Kasreilevke)
- Relatives of Tevye the Dairyman, including his wife Golde and their distant relative Menachem-Mendl hail from Kasrilevka, as hinted in the story "Eighteen from Pereshchepena".
- The Further Adventures of Menachem-Mendl: (New York—Warsaw—Vienna—Yehupetz)
