= Wandering Stars (Aleichem novel) =

Serialized novel from 1901 to 1911 by Sholem Aleichem

- Author: Sholem Aleichem
- Original title: Blondzhende stern
- Language: Yiddish
- Genre: Theatre-fiction
- Publication date: 1909-1911

Wandering Stars (Yiddish: Blonzhende Stern or Blundzhende Shtern) is a novel by Sholem Aleichem, serialized in Warsaw newspapers from 1909 to 1911. In it, Leibel, the son of a wealthy family from a small shtetl, falls in love with a cantor's daughter Reizel, and both fall for a traveling Yiddish theatre group. Their ways part; both become successful performers in the West, under the names of Leo Rafalesco and Rosa Spivak. They eventually find each other again in America, but part again.

It is one of Sholem Aleichem's three novels about artists, the other two being Stempenyu and Yosele Solovey.

Two English translations of the novel exist: a 1952 abridged version by Frances Butwin (Wandering Star), and a 2009 unabridged version by Aliza Shevrin (with a foreword by Tony Kushner).

Yiddishpiel, a Yiddish theatre in Israel, adapted a stage production based on the novel, with book by Aya Kaplan and Joshua Sobol and direction by Aya Kaplan. The production opened in January 2016 at the Tzavta Theater in Tel Aviv and closed by March 2016.

In 1991, a two-part film Wandering Stars was released in the Soviet Union.
