= Amcho =

Jewish shibboleth used during World War II

Amcho or amcha, also transliterated as amkho or amkha (Hebrew: עמכו, romanized: ʾamkho, lit. 'one's people', plural: עמכות ʾamkhot; Yiddish: אמכא, romanized: amkha, lit. 'common people'), is an idiomatic term that refers to the common people, especially Jews, as opposed to the elite. It was commonly used among Jews in Europe, especially during the Holocaust, as a means of identification.

During World War II, when Jewish refugees were seeking family and friends during genocide, the term amcho served as a shibboleth to identify fellow Jews. In modern times, various survivors recall using it to determine if strangers were Jewish and potentially find allies or assistance.

The term originates from Hebrew עמך (amkhá) meaning "one's nation" or "people", through Yiddish עמך (ámkho) meaning "common people," essentially "Jews".

== Personal anecdotes ==
Polish Holocaust survivor Jacob Szapszewicz recounted an incident during the war where he used the term amcho to identify a fellow Jew. While searching for a friend named Moshe, Szapszewicz encountered him crossing a valley. He shouted in Hebrew.

… I saw [a shadow] — because he was a night man too — and he could walk quietly. [When I saw him,] I said, "That must be Moshe," and I started yelling … I was scared to yell Yiddish or Polish. I yelled, "Amcho!" Amcho in Hebrew [was like saying] "Jew." We used to communicate in this way, and nobody could know what amcho [meant]. I yelled, "Amcho, amcho!" He didn’t stop. So, I ran after him and he ran too and I felt he was scared of me, sure. He didn’t know who [I was]. I felt that I'm not going to catch him and I started yelling, "Moshe, Moshe!" and he stopped.

In 1944, Shayke Avni, a Jewish soldier in the Red Army during World War II, recalled using the term to identify a fellow Jewish officer. By asking, he confirmed the officer's Jewish identity and facilitated a warm encounter.

… An officer with the rank of lieutenant, accompanied by about twenty privates, approached my tank. The men were muddy, wet, dirty, and frozen. I don't know how this occurred to me, but I believed that I was seeing a Jewish officer. In those days, I knew already the code accepted among Jews, my word was: Amkho?, and the reply was "Kmokho – amkho." I resorted to this code and, thus, I learned that the officer was indeed Jewish, and that he had been drafted into the Red Army in 1940... Kaplan, that Jewish officer who rode on my tank in 1944, [later] also moved to Israel and, in the late 1960s, we met when both of us were officers of the Israeli Defense Forces. …

== See also ==
- Shibboleth
- Jewish greetings
- Rescue of Jews during the Holocaust
