= Alexander Arkatov =

Russian-Jewish silent film director (1890–1961)

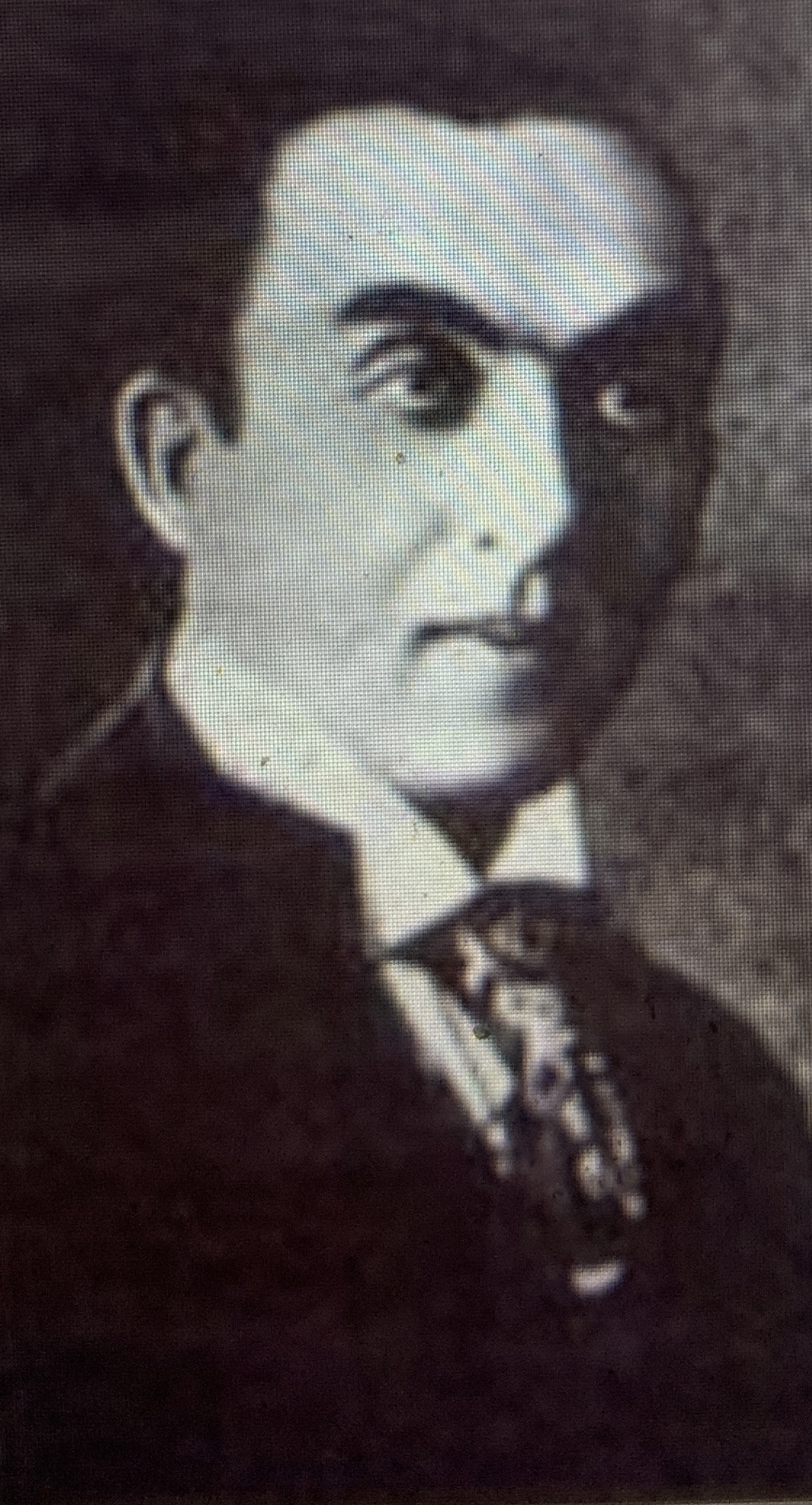
- Born: November 11, 1890; Rechytsa, Russian Empire
- Died: February 6, 1961 (aged 70); Los Angeles, California, US
- Occupations: Silent film director; playwright; journalist; collector

Alexander Arkadyevich Arkatov (Russian: Александр Аркадьевич Аркатов; November 11, 1890 – February 6, 1961) was a Russian-Jewish film director and playwright, known for works such as "L'Chaim" (Л’Хаим, 1910, as a playwright) and "Sorrows of Sarah" (Горе Сарры, 1913, as a director), both of which deal with lives in Jewish settlements in Russia.

== Career ==
Originally a journalist and a film critic, Arkatov started his career in cinema with the 1910 silent film "L'Chaim", based on a well known song from Jewish folklore, on which he worked as a playwright along with the French directors Maurice Maître and Kai Hansen. The film is regarded as the first ever Jewish narrative film created and was deemed a success across the Russian Empire.

He then went on to write and direct tens of other films while traveling all over the world doing so.

Arkatov's first work as a director were the 1912 films "God of Vengeance" ("Бог мести") and "Rachel" (Рахиль).

One highlight in Arkatov's career has to be his 1913 film "Sorrows of Sarah" (Горе Сарры) he directed which is regarded as one of the pinnacles of Jewish cinema. The film depicts a love triangle and the general day to day life in a small Jewish town.

Between the years 1917 and 1918, after the October Bolshevik Revolution, Arkatov worked on four films regarding lives of Jewish people while located at Odessa in a partnership with the Russian film company "Mizrakh" who are known for making the film "Jewish Life in Palestine". The films were censored due to having dealt with the oppression suffered by the Jewish people within the Pale of Settlement under the Tsar's reign.

1918 marks the last year of Arkatov's Jewish centered filmmaking with his film "I Want to Be a Rothschild" (Хочу быть Ротшильдом) he directed. The film is based on a famous monologue by Sholem Aleichem by the same name. Many of Arkatov's works were inspired by Sholom Aleichem's works.

At the time, Arkatov also worked as the head of the State School of Cinema of the RSFSR People's Commissariant of Education.

In the year 1923 Arkatov moved to England and worked as a journalist until he moved to the United States to direct films in Hollywood.

While in New York, Arkatov formed the company "Carter-Arkatov Productions" along with American producer and Playwright Oscar Carter.

While working together, Arkatov and Carter made the Comedy play "Money Business" which played at the National Theater in 1926. The play was based on lives of Jewish immigrants living in the east side of New York in Broadway.

From 1940 to 1945, Arkatov started directing educational films for the US army. After working for the military, Arkatov went back to direct films on his own and also started teaching religious studies, according to his death certificate, as a professor in the University of California

== Personal life ==
Born November 11, 1890, in Rechytsa, The Russian Empire, Alexander Arkatov (originally named Alexander Mogilevsky) lived to 70 when he died on February 6, 1961, in Los Angeles, California.

Arkatov studied history and philology in the Imperial Novorossiya University in Odessa at the same time he studied art at the Odessa College of Arts.

Due to political unreliability, Arkatov was unable to the state examination at the university and as a result – could not live outside the Pale of Settlement, the main Jewish area in Russian territories back then. hence, Arkatov lived in Moscow while breaking the law doing so, there he started his career in cinema.

Arkatov lived throughout Europe and America having lived in The Russian Empire, in Austria, Germany, New York and California.

Arkatov married Tatiana Lee Arkatov (born Whittles) and together they had one son and two daughters.

== Filmography ==
1. 1910 – "L'Chaim" (Лехаим) – screenwriter
2. 1911 – "Violin" (Скрипка) – screenwriter
3. 1912 – "God of Vengeance" (Бог мести), director and screenwriter
4. 1912 – "The Cup of Life and Death" (Кубок жизни и смерти)
5. 1912 – "Rachel" (Рахиль), director and screenwriter
6. 1912 – "War of the twentieth century" (Война ХХ века)
7. 1913 – "Sorrows of Sarah" (Горе Сарры) – director
8. 1915 – "The Scalped Corpse" (Скальпированный труп) – director
9. 1915 – "Volgari" (Волгари) – director
10. 1916 – "Oh, why this night was so good" (Ах, зачем эта ночь так была хороша) – screenwriter, director
11. 1916 – "Katerina the gas chamber" (Катерина-душегубка) – the film was shot for the "Rus" cinema
12. 1917 – "Daughter of Anna Karenina" (Дочь Анны Карениной) – screenwriter, director
13. 1917 – "The Cantonists" (Кантонисты), historical drama '- director and screenwriter
14. 1917 – "Judge, People" (Судите, люди) – director and screenwriter
15. 1918 – "Bloody Joke" (Кровавая шутка), based on the works of Sholem Aleichem – director and screenwriter
16. 1918 – "I Want to Be a Rothschild" (Хочу быть Ротшильдом) – director
17. 1918 – "The Tale of the priest Pankrat" (Сказка о попе Панкрате) – director, screenwriter
18. 1918 – "Signal" (Сигнал) – director
19. 1919 – "Two Worlds" (Два мира) – directed by V. Chernobler
20. 1919 – "Between Two Flags" (Между двух флагов) – director
21. 1919 – "Spiders and Flies" (Пауки и мухи) – actor
22. 1919 – "Parasite" (Паразит) – directed by E. Pukhalsky
23. 1919 – "Reconciled with Conscience" (Примиренные с совестью) – directed by V. Starevich
24. 1919 – "Four Months at Denikin's" (Четыре месяца у Деникина) – directed by E. Pukhalsky
25. 1919 – "Pages of humor edited by A. Arkatov" (Странички юмора под редакцией А. Аркатова) – director, screenwriter
26. 1920 – "May first" (Первое мая) – director, screenwriter
27. 1920 – "The Tale of the Seven Hanged" (Рассказ о семи повешенных) – screenwriter
28. 1921 – "Jean Torot" (Жан Торот) – (Austria) – director
29. 1921 – "Give the Dead Peace" (Дайте мертвым покой) – (Austria) – director
30. 1927 – "Patriot" (Патриот) – (Germany) – assistant director
