= Sholem Aleichem =

Yiddish author and playwright (1859–1916)

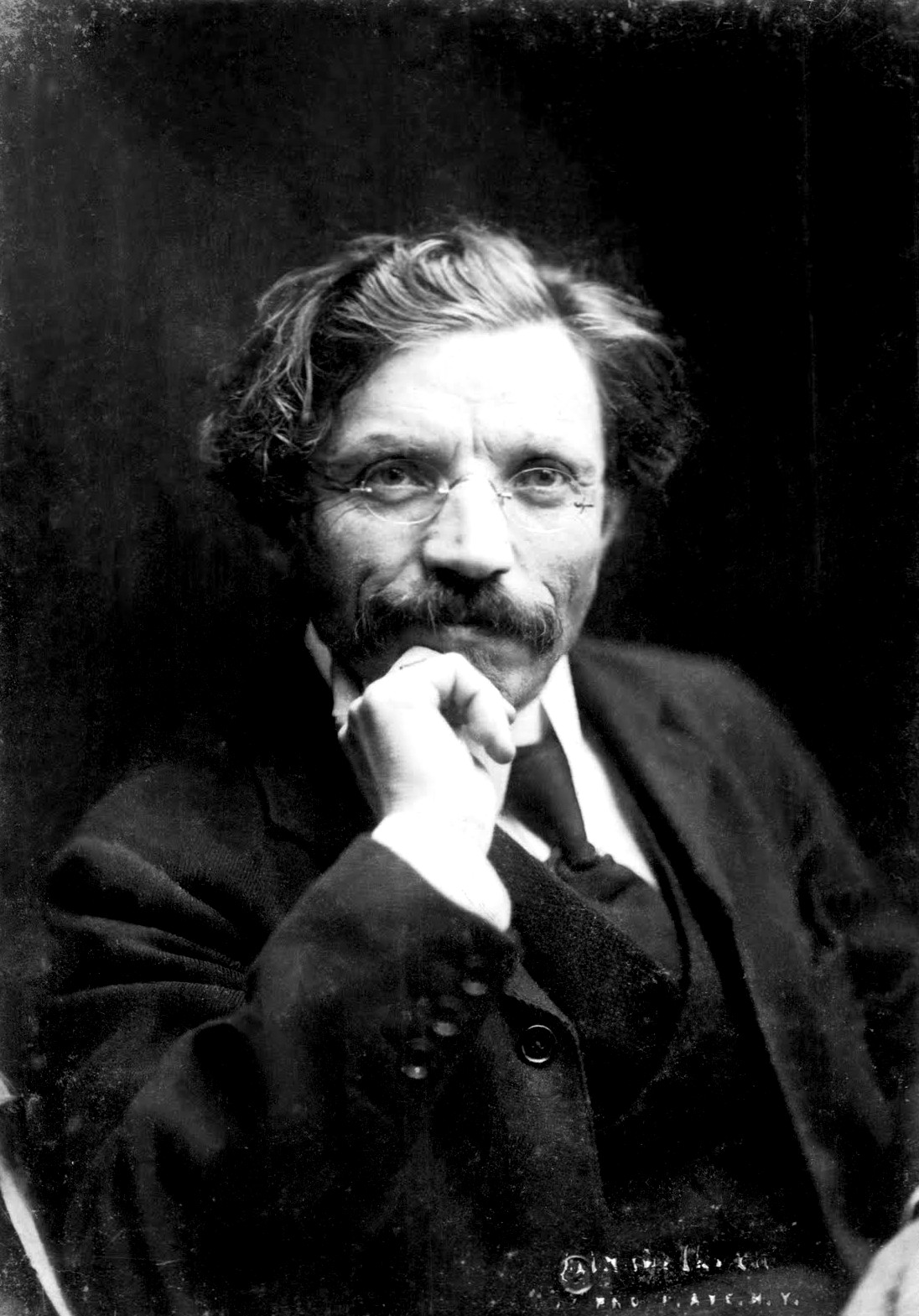
- Sholem Aleichem in 1907
- Born: Shalom Rabinovich; 2 March [O.S. 18 February] 1859; Pereiaslav, Poltava Governorate, Russian Empire
- Died: May 13, 1916 (aged 57); New York City, United States
- Occupation: Writer
- Writing career
- Pen name: Sholem Aleichem (Yiddish: שלום עליכם)
- Language: Yiddish; Hebrew; Russian
- Genres: Novels; short stories; plays
- Movement: Yiddish revival

Solomon Naumovich Rabinovich (Note: Russian: Соломо́н Нау́мович Рабино́вич) or Solomon Naumovych Rabinovych (Note: Ukrainian: Соломо́н Нау́мович Рабіно́вич) (2 March [O.S. 18 February] 1859 – May 13, 1916), better known under his pen name Sholem Aleichem, (Note: Yiddish and Hebrew: שלום עליכם, also spelled שאָלעם־אלייכעם in Soviet Yiddish, [ˈʃɔləm aˈlɛjxəm]; Russian and Ukrainian: Шо́лом-Але́йхем) was a Ukrainian Jewish author and playwright who wrote in Yiddish and lived in the Russian Empire and later the United States. The 1964 musical Fiddler on the Roof, based on Aleichem's stories about Tevye the Dairyman, was the first commercially successful English-language stage production about Jewish life in Eastern Europe.

The Hebrew phrase שלום עליכם (shalom aleichem) literally means "[May] peace [be] upon you!", and is a greeting in traditional Hebrew and Yiddish.

== Biography ==
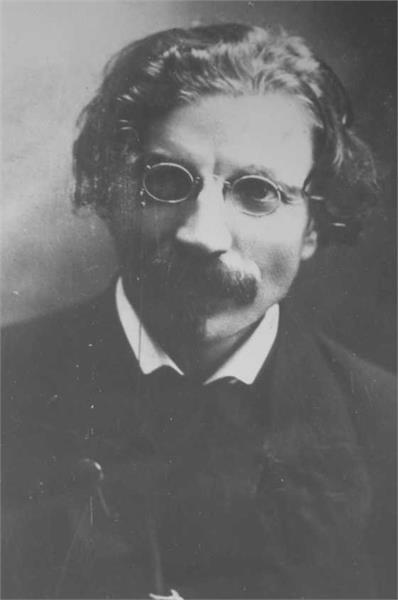
Sholem Aleichem in 1910

Solomon Naumovich (Sholom Nohumovich) Rabinovich (Russian: Соломо́н Нау́мович (Шо́лом Но́хумович) Рабино́вич) was born in 1859 in Pereiaslav and grew up in the nearby shtetl of Voronkiv, in the Poltava Governorate of the Russian Empire (present-day Ukraine). (Voronkiv has become the prototype of Aleichem's Kasrilevka.) His father, Nokhem Rabinovich (Nokhim Volko's Rabinovich; Нохимъ Вольковъ Рабиновичъ), was a rich merchant at that time. However, a failed business affair plunged the family into poverty and Solomon Rabinovich grew up in reduced circumstances. When he was 13 years old, the family moved back to Pereiaslav, where his mother, Chaye-Esther, died in a cholera epidemic.

Sholem Aleichem's first venture into writing was an alphabetic glossary of the epithets used by his stepmother. At the age of fifteen, he composed a Jewish version of the novel Robinson Crusoe. He adopted the pseudonym Sholem Aleichem, the Yiddish greeting meaning "peace be with you", like the Hebrew shalom aleichem.

In 1876, after graduating from school in Pereiaslav, he began to work as a teacher. During 1877–1880 in Sofijka village, Bohuslav region, he spent three years tutoring a wealthy landowner's daughter, Olga (Hodel) Loev (1865–1942). From 1880 to 1883 he served as crown rabbi in Lubny. On May 12, 1883, he and Olga married, against the wishes of her father, whose estate they inherited a few years later. Their first child, a daughter named Ernestina (Tissa), was born in 1884. In 1890, Sholem Aleichem lost their entire fortune in stock speculation and fled from his creditors. His second daughter Lyalya (Lili) was born in 1887; as Lyalya Kaufman, she became a Hebrew writer. A third daughter, Emma, was born in 1888. In 1889, Olga gave birth to a son. They named him Elimelech, after Olga's father, but at home they called him Misha. Daughter Marusi (who would one day publish "My Father, Sholom Aleichem" under her married name Marie Waife-Goldberg) was born in 1892. A final child, a son named Nochum (Numa) after Solomon's father was born in 1901 (under the name Norman Raeben he became a painter and an influential art teacher).

After witnessing the pogroms that swept through southern Russian Empire in 1905, including Kiev, Sholem Aleichem left Kiev (which was fictionalized as Yehupetz) and he embarked on a tour in Galicia, Bukovina, Romania, France, England and Switzerland. He then traveled to New York City in late 1906. He then emigrated to New York City, where he arrived in 1906. His family set up house in Geneva, Switzerland, but when he saw he could not afford to maintain two households, he joined them in Geneva in 1908. Despite his great popularity, he was forced to take up an exhausting schedule of lecturing to make ends meet. In July 1908, during a reading tour in Russia, Sholem Aleichem collapsed on a train going through Baranowicze. He was diagnosed with a relapse of acute hemorrhagic tuberculosis and spent two months convalescing in the town's hospital. He later described the incident as "meeting his majesty, the Angel of Death, face to face", and claimed it as the catalyst for writing his autobiography, Funem yarid [From the Fair]. He thus missed the first Conference for the Yiddish Language, held in 1908 in Czernovitz; his colleague and fellow Yiddish activist Nathan Birnbaum went in his place.

Sholem Aleichem spent the next four years living as a semi-invalid. During this period the family was largely supported by donations from friends and admirers (among his friends and acquaintances were fellow Yiddish authors I. L. Peretz, Jacob Dinezon, Mordecai Spector, and Noach Pryłucki). In 1909, in celebration of his 25th Jubilee as a writer, his friend and colleague Jacob Dinezon spearheaded a committee with Dr. Gershon Levine, Abraham Podlishevsky, and Noach Pryłucki to buy back the publishing rights to Sholem Aleichem's works from various publishers for his sole use in order to provide him with a steady income. At a time when Sholem Aleichem was ill and struggling financially, this proved to be an invaluable gift, and Sholem Aleichem expressed his gratitude in a thank you letter in which he wrote,

“If I tried to tell you a hundredth part of the way I feel about you, I know that that would be sheer profanation. If I am fated to live a few years longer than I have been expecting, I shall doubtless be able to say that it’s your fault, yours and that of all the other friends who have done so much to carry out your idea of ‘the redemption of the imprisoned.’”

— Sholem Aleichem

Sholem Aleichem moved to New York City again with his family in 1914. The family lived at first in Harlem at 110 Lenox Avenue (at 116th Street) and later moved to 968 Kelly Street in the Bronx. His son, Misha, ill with tuberculosis, was not permitted entry under United States immigration laws and remained in Switzerland with his sister Emma.

Sholem Aleichem died at his Bronx apartment in 1916. He is buried in the main (old) section of Mount Carmel Cemetery in Queens, New York City.

== Literary career ==
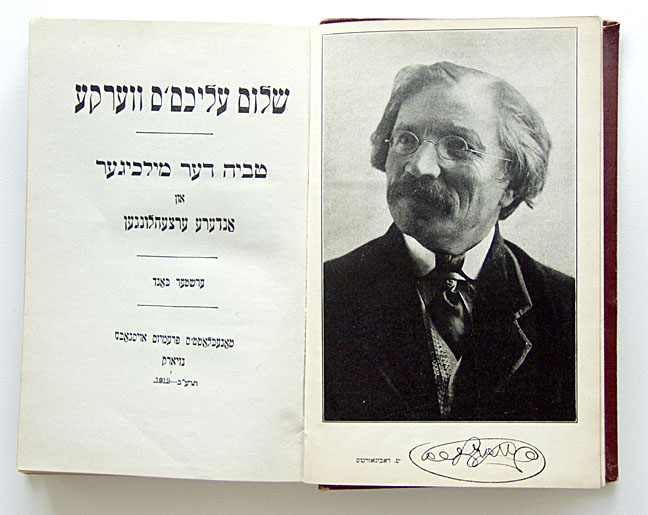
A volume of Sholem Aleichem stories in Yiddish, with the author's portrait and signature

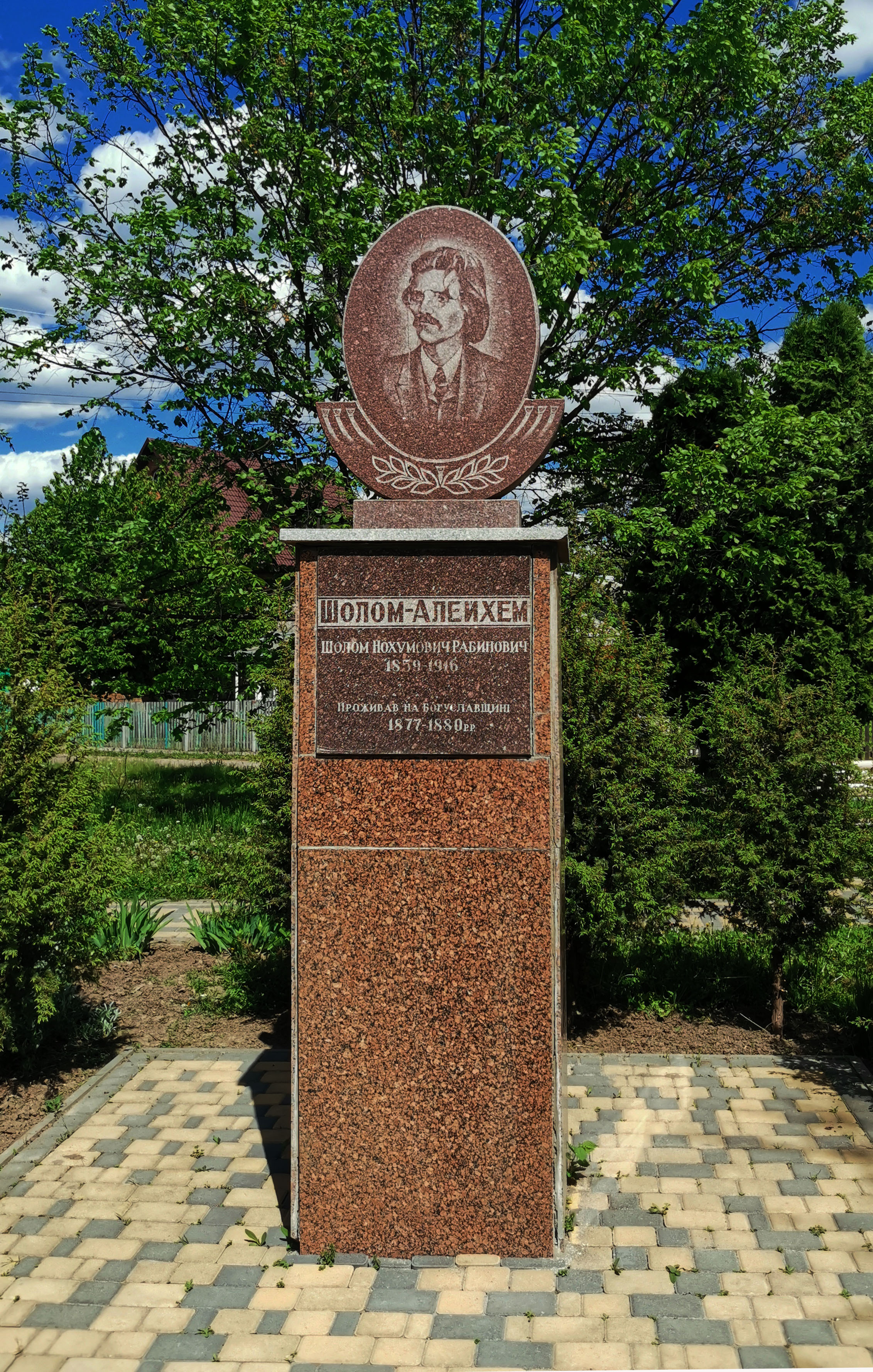
Monument to Sholem Aleichem in Bohuslav, Ukraine

Like his contemporaries Mendele Mocher Sforim, I. L. Peretz, and Jacob Dinezon, Sholem Rabinovitch started writing in Hebrew, as well as in Russian. In 1883, when he was 24 years old, he published his first Yiddish story Yiddish: צוויי שטיינער, romanized: Tsvey Shteyner, using the pseudonym Sholem Aleichem for the first time.

By 1890, he was a central figure in Yiddish literature, the vernacular language of nearly all Eastern European Jews, and had produced over forty volumes in Yiddish. It was often derisively called 'jargon', but Sholem Aleichem used this term in an entirely non-pejorative sense.

Apart from his own literary output, Sholem Aleichem used his personal fortune to encourage other Yiddish writers. In 1888–89, he put out two issues of an almanac (Yiddish: די ייִדישע פאָלקסביבליאָטעק, romanized: Di Yidishe Folksbibliotek, lit. '"The Yiddish Public Library"') which gave important exposure to young Yiddish writers.

In 1890, after he lost his entire fortune, he could not afford to print the almanac's third issue, which had been edited but was subsequently never printed.

Tevye the Dairyman (Yiddish: טבֿיה דער מילכיקער, romanized: Tevye der Milchiker) was first published in 1894.

Over the next few years, while continuing to write in Yiddish, he also wrote in Russian for an Odessa newspaper and for Voskhod, the leading Russian Jewish publication of the time, as well as in Hebrew for Ha-Melitz, and for an anthology edited by Yehoshua Hana Rawnitzki. It was during this period that Sholem Aleichem contracted tuberculosis.

In August 1904, Sholem Aleichem edited "Help: An Anthology for Literature and Art" (Yiddish: הילף : א זאַמלבוך פיר ליטעראטור אונ קונסט, romanized: Hilf: a Zaml-Bukh fir Literatur un Kunst; Warsaw, 1904) and himself translated three stories submitted by Leo Tolstoy ("Esarhaddon, King of Assyria"; "Work, Death, and Sickness"; "The Three Questions") as well as contributions by other prominent Russian writers, including Anton Chekhov, in aid of the victims of the Kishinev pogrom.

== Critical reception ==
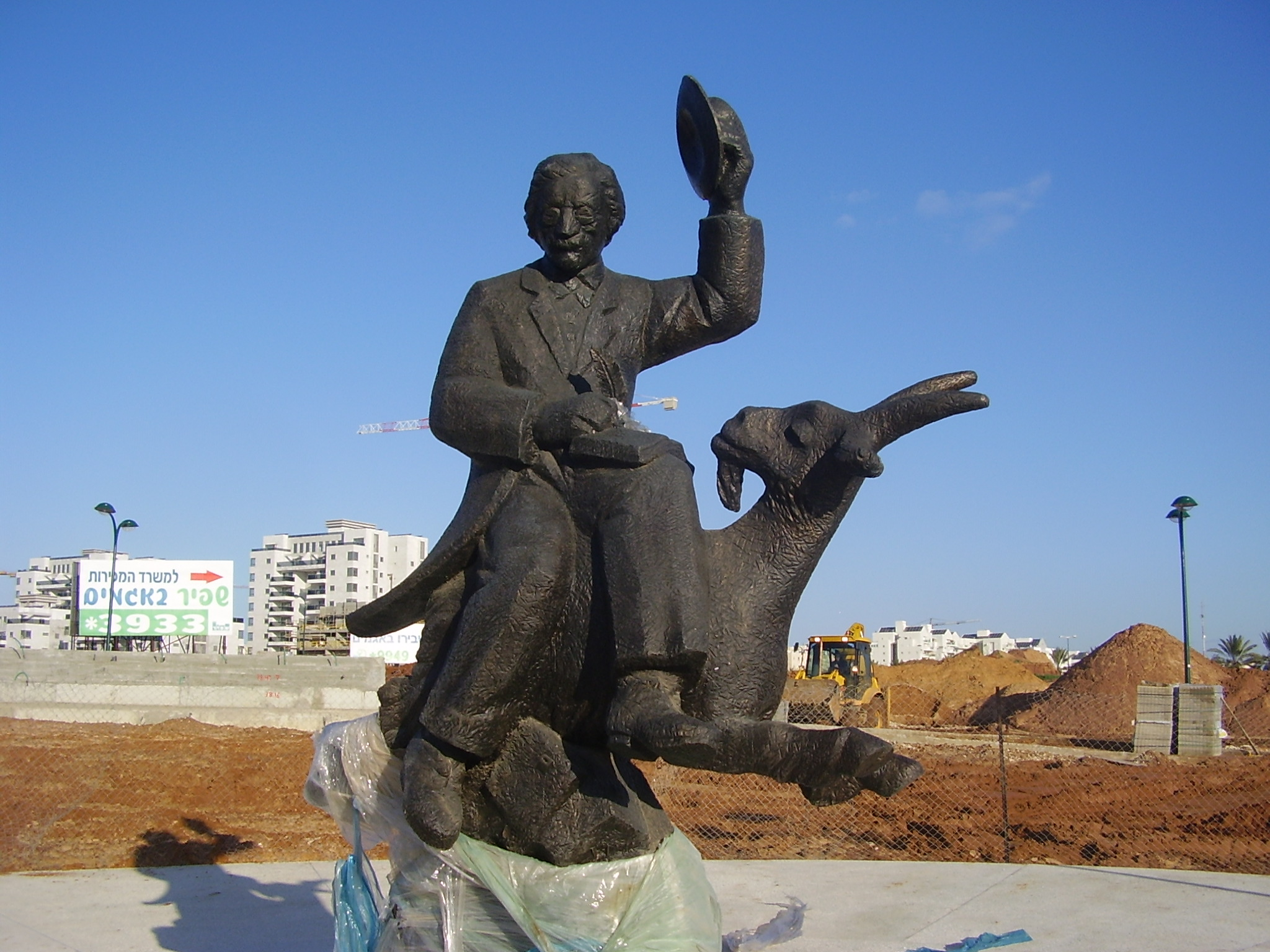
Sholem Aleichem statue in Netanya, Israel

Sholem Aleichem's narratives were notable for the naturalness of his characters' speech and the accuracy of his descriptions of shtetl life. Early critics focused on the cheerfulness of the characters, interpreted as a way of coping with adversity. Later critics saw a tragic side in his writing. He was often referred to as the "Jewish Mark Twain" because of the two authors' similar writing styles and use of pen names. Both authors wrote for adults and children and lectured extensively in Europe and the United States. When Twain heard of the writer called "the Jewish Mark Twain," he replied, "Please tell him that I am the American Sholem Aleichem."

== Beliefs and activism ==
Sholem Aleichem was an impassioned advocate of Yiddish as a national Jewish language, which he felt should be accorded the same status and respect as other modern European languages. He did not stop with what came to be called "Yiddishism", but devoted himself to the cause of Zionism as well. Many of his writings present the Zionist case. In 1888, he became a member of Lovers of Zion. In 1907, he served as an American delegate to the Eighth Zionist Congress held in The Hague.

Sholem Aleichem had a fear of the number 13. His manuscripts never had a page 13; he numbered the thirteenth pages of his manuscripts as 12a. Though it has been written that even his gravestone carries the date of his death as "May 12a, 1916", his headstone reads the dates of his birth and death in Hebrew, Adar 26 and Iyar 10, respectively.

== Death ==
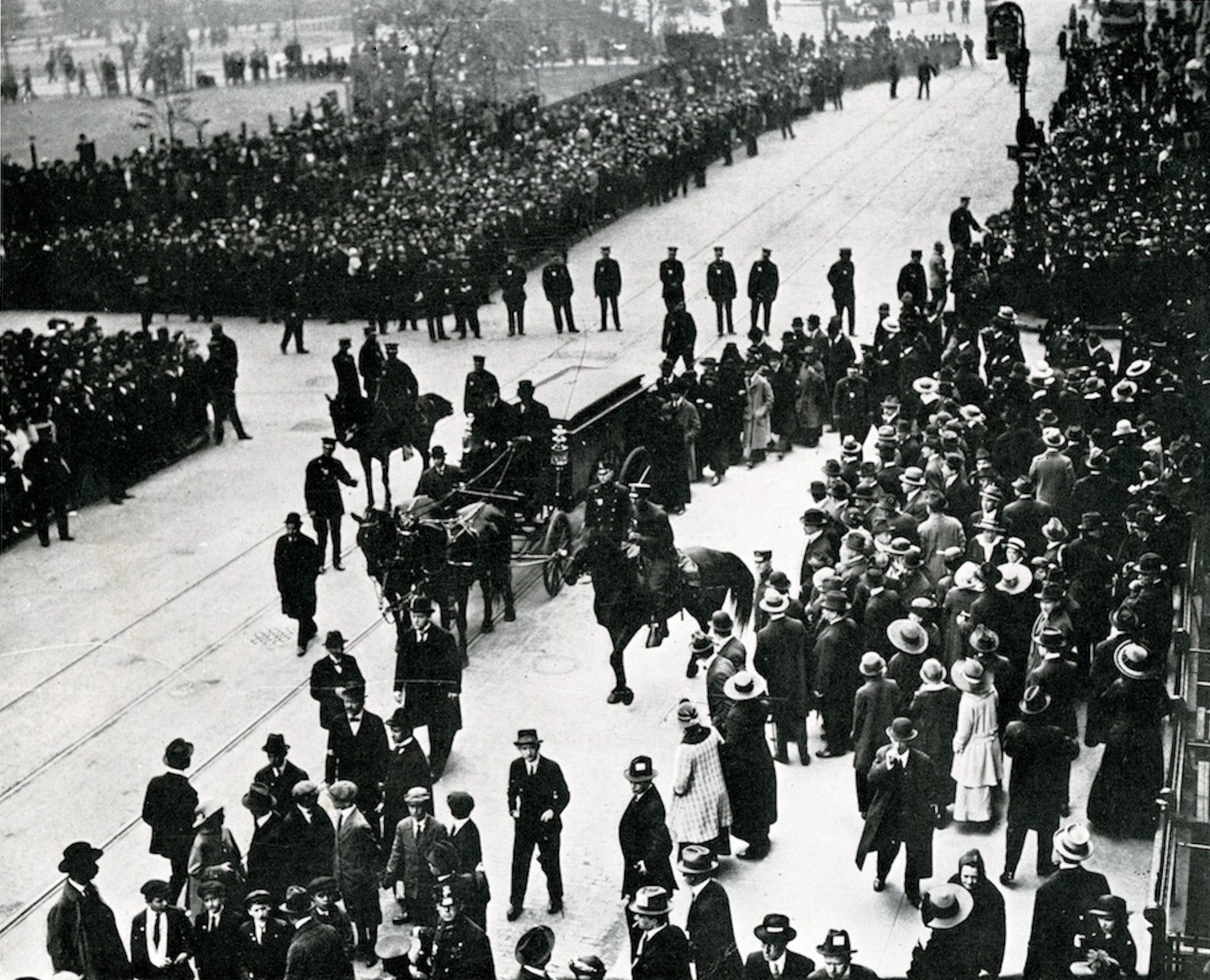
Sholem Aleichem's funeral on May 15, 1916

Sholem Aleichem died in New York on May 13, 1916, from tuberculosis and diabetes, aged 57, while working on his last novel, Motl, Peysi the Cantor's Son, and was buried at Old Mount Carmel cemetery in Queens. At the time, his funeral was one of the largest in New York City history, with an estimated 100,000 mourners. The next day, his will was printed in the New York Times and was read into the Congressional Record of the United States.

== Commemoration and legacy ==
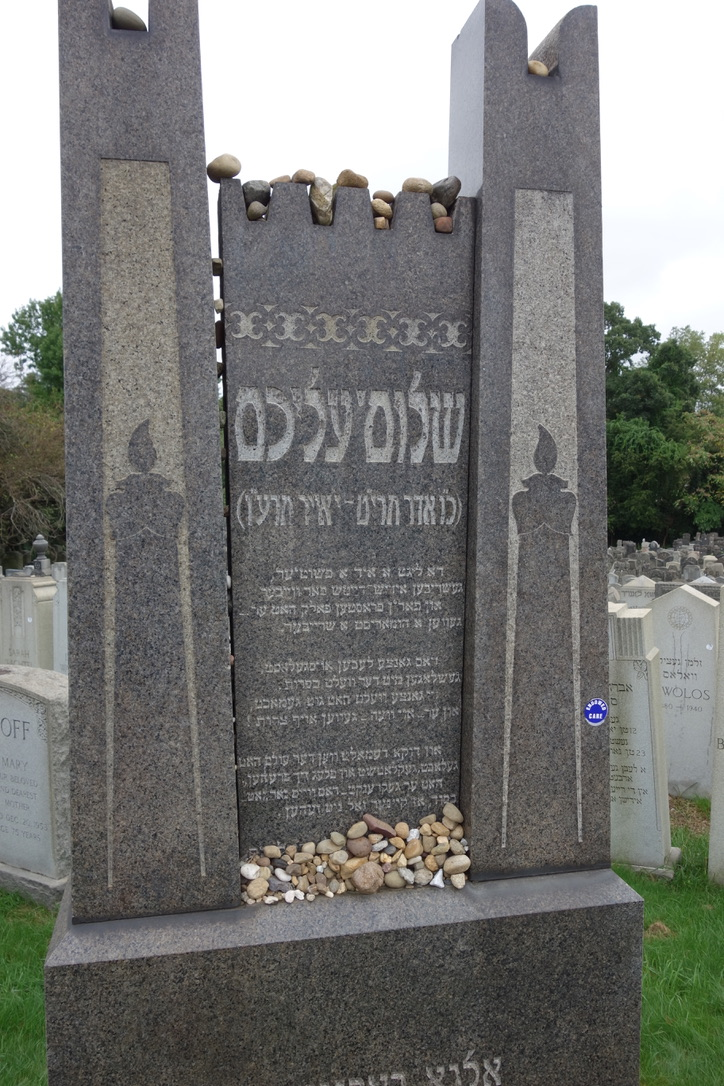
Gravestone of Sholem Aleichem covered by dozens of visitation stones in Mount Carmel Cemetery.

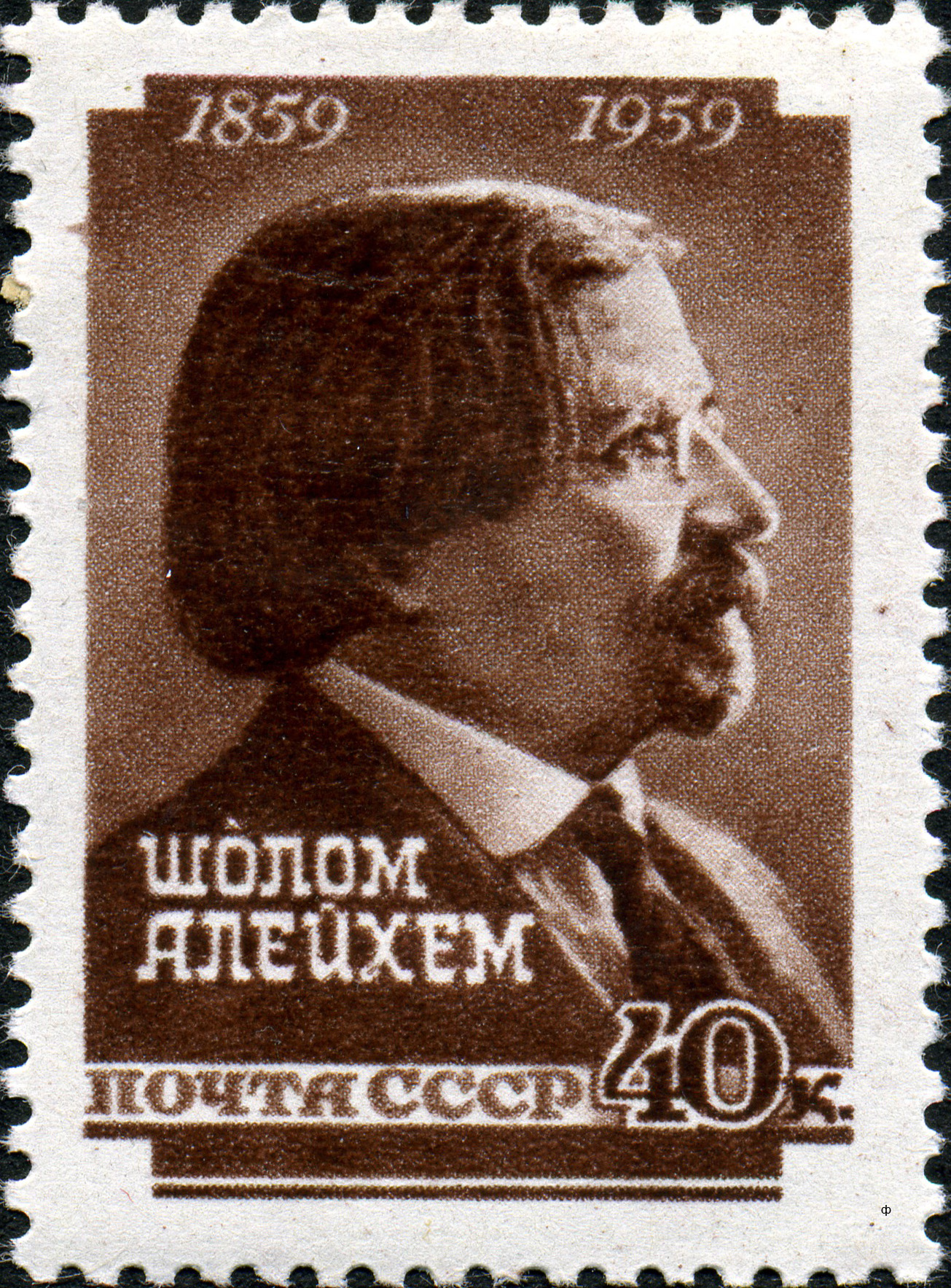
A 1959 Soviet Union postage stamp commemorating the centennial of Sholem Aleichem's birth

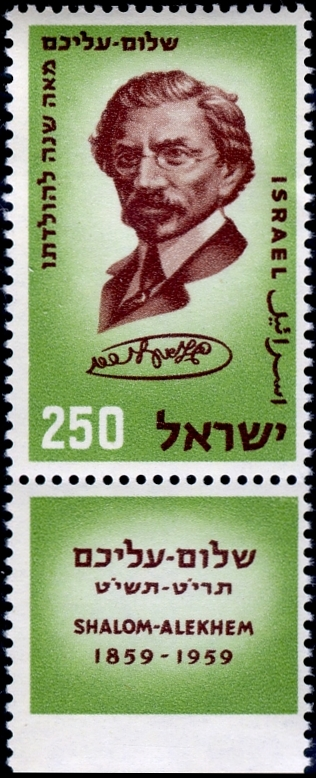
Israeli postal stamp, 1959

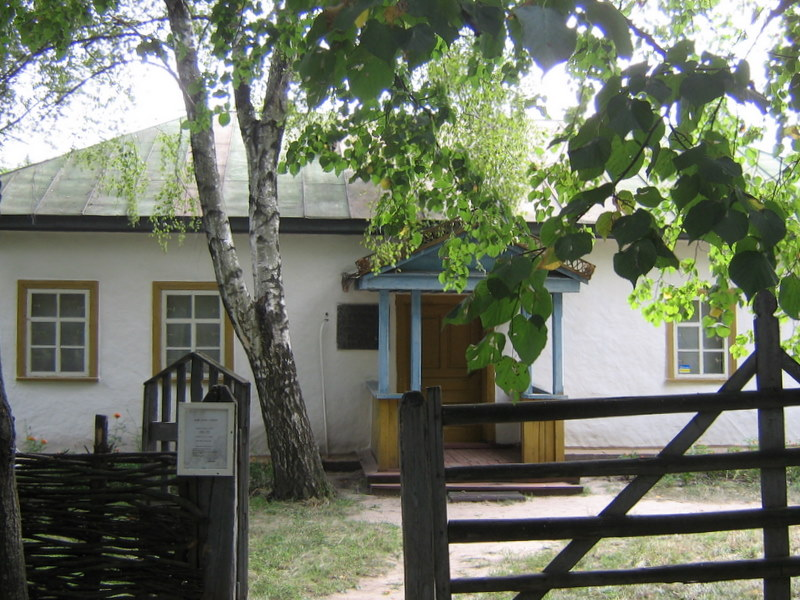
Museum of Sholem Aleichem in Pereiaslav

Sholem Aleichem's will contained detailed instructions to family and friends with regard to burial arrangements and marking his yahrtzeit.

He told his friends and family to gather, "read my will, and also select one of my stories, one of the very merry ones, and recite it in whatever language is most intelligible to you." "Let my name be recalled with laughter," he added, "or not at all." The celebrations continue to the present day, and, in recent years, have been held at the Brotherhood Synagogue on Gramercy Park South in New York City, where they are open to the public.

He composed the text to be engraved on his tombstone in Yiddish, given here in the original, in transliteration, and in translation:

Original Yiddish

דא ליגט א איד א פשוט׳ער,
געשריבען אידיש־דײטש פאר װײבער
און פאר׳ן פראסטען פאלק האט ער-
געװען אַ הומאריסט א שרײבער.

דאס גאנצע לעבן אױסגעלאכט,
געשלאגן מיט דער װעלט כפרות.
די גאנצע װעלט האט גוט געמאכט,
און ער — אױ װעה — געװען אױף צרות!

און דוקא דעמאלט װען דער עולם האט
געלאכט, געקלאטשט און פלעג זיך פרעהען,
האט ער געקרענקט — דאס װײס נאר גאט -
בסוד, אז קײנער זאל ניט זעהען.

Transliteration

Do ligt a yid a posheter,
geshribn yidish-daytsh far vayber
un far'n prosten folk hot er-
geven a humorist a shrayber.

Dos gantse lebn oysgelakht,
geshlogn mit der velt kapores.
Di gantse velt hot gut gemakht,
un er – oy vey – geven af tsores!

Un davke demolt ven der oylem hot
gelakht, geklatsht un fleg zikh freyen
hot er gekrenkt – dos veys nor got –
besod, az keyner zol nit zehen.

English Translation

Here lies a simple Jew,
He wrote Jewish-German for women
and for simple people,
was a humorist and writer.

Laughed at his whole life,
he used the world for kapores
The whole world did well,
and he – alas – had troubles.

And precisely when the crowd
laughed, clapped and rejoiced,
he grew ill – only God knows this –
in secret, so no one would see.

In 1997, a monument dedicated to Sholem Aleichem was erected in Kyiv; another was erected in 2001 in Moscow.

The main street of Birobidzhan is named after Sholem Aleichem; streets were named after him also in cities in Ukraine, including Kyiv, Odessa, Chernivtsi, Vinnytsia, Lviv, and Zhytomyr. In New York City in 1996, East 33rd Street between Park and Madison Avenue is additionally named "Sholem Aleichem Place". Many streets in Israel are named after him.

Postage stamps of Sholem Aleichem were issued by Israel (Scott #154, 1959); the Soviet Union (Scott #2164, 1959); Romania (Scott #1268, 1959); and Ukraine (Scott #758, 2009).

An impact crater on the planet Mercury also bears his name.

On March 2, 2009, 150 years after his birth, the National Bank of Ukraine issued an anniversary coin depicting and celebrating Aleichem.

Vilnius, Lithuania has a Jewish school named after him and in Melbourne, Australia a Yiddish school, Sholem Aleichem College is named after him. Several Jewish schools in Argentina were also named after him.

In Rio de Janeiro, Brazil a library named BIBSA – Biblioteca Sholem Aleichem was founded in 1915 as a Zionist institution by a local Jewish group. Next year, in 1916, the same group that created BIBSA founded a Jewish school named Escola Sholem Aleichem; it closed in 1997. BIBSA had a very active theatrical program in Yiddish for more than 50 years since its foundation and consistently performed Sholem Aleichem plays. In 1947 BIBSA became Associação Sholem Aleichem, under which name it continues to exist. Both the library and club became communist institutions due to a normal transition of power in the founding group, although non-communist members left to found their own school, Colégio Eliezer Steinbarg, in 1956. It is named after the first director of Escola Sholem Aleichem, a Jewish writer born in Romania who immigrated to Brazil.

In the Bronx, New York, a housing complex called The Shalom Aleichem Houses was built by Yiddish speaking immigrants in the 1920s, and was recently restored by new owners to its original grandeur. The Shalom Alecheim Houses are part of a proposed historic district in the area.

On May 13, 2016, a Sholem Aleichem website was launched to mark the 100th anniversary of Sholem Aleichem's death. The website is a partnership between Sholem Aleichem's family, his biographer Professor Jeremy Dauber, Citizen Film, Columbia University's Center for Israel and Jewish Studies, The Covenant Foundation, and The Yiddish Book Center. The website features interactive maps and timelines, recommended readings, as well as a list of centennial celebration events taking place worldwide. The website also features resources for educators.

Hertz Grosbard recited many of his works in so called "word concerts". A reading in Yiddish of his monologue If I Were a Rothschild and several others can be found on the Grosbard Project.

The writer's brother, Wolf Rabinovich, published the memoir "My Brother Sholom Aleichem" in Kyiv, Ukrainian SSR, in 1939.

Sholem Aleichem's granddaughter, Bel Kaufman, by his daughter Lala (Lyalya), was an American author, best known for her novel, Up the Down Staircase, published in 1964, which was adapted for the stage and made into a film in 1967.

== Works ==
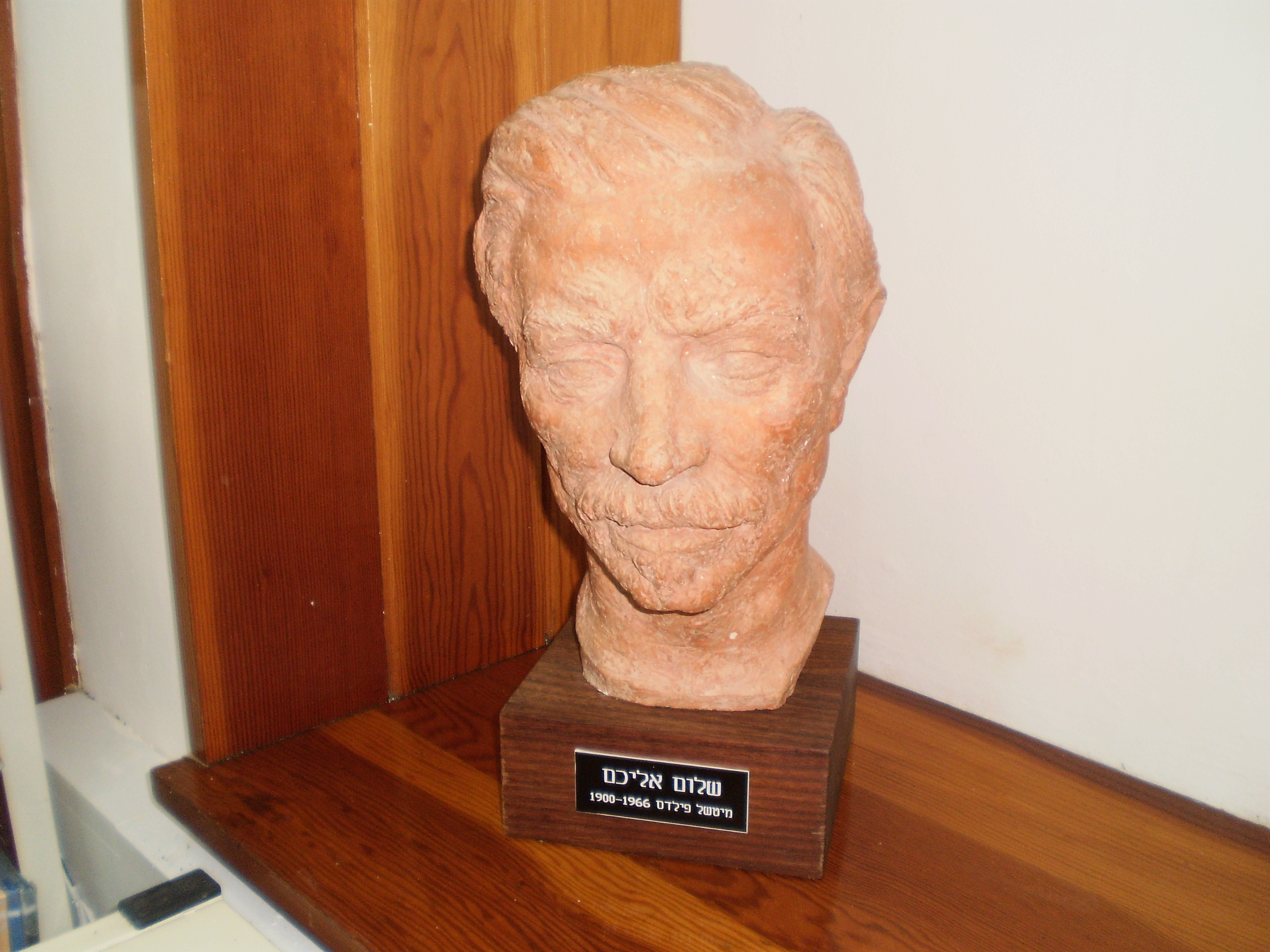
Portrait bust of Sholem Aleichem (1859–1916) sculpted by Mitchell Fields

=== English-language collections ===
- Tevye's Daughters: Collected Stories of Sholom Aleichem by Sholem Aleichem, transl Frances Butwin, illus Ben Shahn, NY: Crown, 1949. The stories which form the basis for Fiddler on the Roof.
- The Best of Sholom Aleichem, edited by R. Wisse, I. Howe (originally published 1979), Walker and Co., 1991, ISBN 0-8027-2645-3.
- Tevye the Dairyman and the Railroad Stories, translated by H. Halkin (originally published 1987), Schocken Books, 1996, ISBN 0-8052-1069-5.
- Nineteen to the Dozen: Monologues and Bits and Bobs of Other Things, translated by Ted Gorelick, Syracuse Univ Press, 1998, ISBN 0-8156-0477-7.
- A Treasury of Sholom Aleichem Children's Stories, translated by Aliza Shevrin, Jason Aronson, 1996, ISBN 1-56821-926-1.
- Inside Kasrilovka, Three Stories, translated by I. Goldstick, Schocken Books, 1948 (variously reprinted)
- The Old Country, translated by Julius & Frances Butwin, J B H of Peconic, 1999, ISBN 1-929068-21-2.
- Stories and Satires, translated by Curt Leviant, Sholom Aleichem Family Publications, 1999, ISBN 1-929068-20-4.
- Selected Works of Sholem-Aleykhem, edited by Marvin Zuckerman & Marion Herbst (Volume II of "The Three Great Classic Writers of Modern Yiddish Literature"), Joseph Simon Pangloss Press, 1994, ISBN 0-934710-24-4.
- Some Laughter, Some Tears, translated by Curt Leviant, Paperback Library, 1969, Library of Congress Catalog Card Number 68–25445.
- Tevye the Dairyman and Motl the Cantor's Son, translated by Aliza Shevrin, Penguin Books, 2009, ISBN 978-0-14-310560-2.

=== Autobiography ===
- פונעם יאריד Funem yarid, written 1914–1916, translated as The Great Fair by Tamara Kahana, Noonday Press, 1955; translated by Curt Leviant as From the Fair, Viking, 1986, ISBN 0-14-008830-X.

=== Novels ===
- Stempenyu: A Jewish Novel, originally published in his Folksbibliotek, adapted 1905 for the play Jewish Daughters.
- Yosele Solovey (1889, published in his Folksbibliotek, first English translation: The Nightingale (1985))
- Tevye's Daughters, translated by F. Butwin (originally published 1949), Crown, 1959, ISBN 0-517-50710-2.
- Mottel the Cantor's son
  Originally written in Yiddish in two parts: the first written in 1907-1908 and the second one, unfinished, written in 1915-1916. It was the last novel of the author. The first English translation: Henry Schuman, Inc. New York 1953, Translated by Tamara Kahana (6a), the author's grand daughter.
- In the Storm
  It was first published in 1907 and translated into English in 1984 by Aliza Shevrin. With Sholem Aleichem's dark humor, the novel is set among the vents preceding the 1905 pogroms in the Russian Empire. The main protagonists are three men from different strata of Jewish Kiev society, with their families: Itzikl Shostepol, "the politicking, complaining, ubiquitous bourgeois Jew", "the assimilated pharmacist" Solomon Safranovitch, and Nehemiah the shoemaker. Their lives are affected both by Tzarist oppression and the promises of salvation from socialists and Zionist.
- Wandering Stars
  2009: an unabridged translation by Aliza Shevrin
- Marienbad, translated by Aliza Shevrin (1982, G.P. Putnam Sons, New York) from original Yiddish manuscript copyrighted by Olga Rabinowitz in 1917
- The Bloody Hoax (Der blutiker shpas)
  English translation by Aliza Shevrin, 1991.
  The idea was same as in The Prince and the Pauper: two friend students, a Russian and a Jew, decide to swap identities and to live each other's life for a year. The title refers to the twist of the plot: the Russian (Christian) young man fell victim of a blood libel, being accused of killing a Christian child.
- Menahem-Mendl, translated as The Adventures of Menahem-Mendl by Tamara Kahana, Sholom Aleichem Family Publications, 1969, ISBN 1-929068-02-6.
- Moshkeleh Ganev (1903), translated as Moshkeleh the Thief by Curt Leviant, University of Nebraska Press, 2021, ISBN 978-0-8276-1515-1.
- The Bewitched Tailor (initially published as A mayse on an ek ("A story without end") in Warsaw in 1901

=== Plays ===
- The Doctor (1887), one-act comedy
- Der get (The Divorce, 1888), one-act comedy
- Di asife (The Assembly, 1889), one-act comedy
- Mazel Tov (1889), one-act play
- יקנ”ז (Yaknez; 1894), a satire on brokers and speculators from Yehupetz, unpublished
  The word is a mnemonics (Yayin (wine), Kiddush HaYom (blessing the day), Ner (candle), and Zman (time, i.e. shehechiyanu)) for the order of Havdalah blessings when the eighth day of Passover (outside of Israel) falls on Saturday night. However, in the play the word has a different meaning: It refers to a kind of security on a stock market everybody eagers to buy, but nobody really understands what it is. In the end it turns out to be a fraud. The characters of the play include Menahem-Mendl.
- Tsezeyt un tseshpreyt (Scattered Far and Wide, 1903), comedy
- Agentn (Agents, 1908), one-act comedy
- Yidishe tekhter (Jewish Daughters, 1905) drama, adaptation of his early novel Stempenyu
- Di goldgreber (The Golddiggers, 1907), comedy
- Shver tsu zayn a yid (It's Hard to be a Jew / If I Were You, 1914)
- Dos groyse gevins, Yiddish: דאָס גרויסע געווינס (The Big Lottery / The Jackpot, 1916)
- Tevye der milkhiker, (Tevye the Milkman, 1917, performed posthumously)

=== Miscellany ===
- Jewish Children, translated by Hannah Berman, William Morrow & Co, 1987, ISBN 0-688-84120-1.
- numerous stories in Russian, published in Voskhod (1891–1892)

== Adaptations ==
- A 1918 film, Bloody Joke (Кровавая шутка), by director and screenwriter Alexander Arkatov, was based on works by Sholem Aleichem.
- Broken Barriers (1919)
- Durkh trern (1928)
- In 1939, Maurice Schwartz wrote, directed, and starred as Aleichem's best-known character, in Tevya.
- One of the most successful Broadway musicals of all time, Fiddler on the Roof, music by Jerry Bock, lyrics by Sheldon Harnick, and book by Joseph Stein, is based on the Tevye stories; Fiddler has been revived many times since its premiere in 1964 and was made into a film with the same name in 1971.
- Jewish Luck (1925)
- Wandering Stars (1991)
