= Leningrad Experimental Graphics Laboratory =

Former arts collective in USSR

The Leningrad Experimental Graphics Laboratory (Russian: Ленинградская экспериментальная литографская мастерская) or LEGL was an artists' collective in Soviet Russia that lasted from the time of Khruschev's thaw to the dissolution of the USSR in 1992. Formally, the LEGL was the graphics section of the state-run Artists' Union of the USSR that was based in Leningrad (now St Petersburg). The group came to the notice of Western critics in 1962, when the London-based collector and art dealer Eric Estorick staged an exhibition of their work at the Grosvenor Gallery. Estorick had purchased over a hundred works by LEGL artists during a trip to the Soviet Union in 1960. A selection of their work was again exhibited in London at the Estorick Gallery in 2019.

In the 1970s a selection of the works were acquired by the Hebrew Home, an elderly care facility in Riverdale, New York City, where Eric Estorick's father was a resident. These works were included in a 2019 exhibition at the Derfner Judaica Museum, which is owned by Hebrew Home.

A selection of LEGL artworks was exhibited at the Anna Akhmatova Literary and Memorial Museum in St Petersburg in 2017.

== Key members ==
- Lev Britanishsky
- Valentin Yakovlevich Brodsky
- Boris Nikolaevich Ermolaev (1903–1982)
- Grigori Aleksandrovich Izrailevich
- Anatoli Lvovich Kaplan
- Minei Kuks
- August Vasilievich Lanin (1925-2006)
- Alexandra Natanovna Latash
- Irina Nikolaevich Maslennikova
- Vera Fedorovna Matyukh (1910-2003)
- Gerta Mikhailovna Nemenova
- Mikhail Nikolaevich Skulyari (1905-1985)
- Sergey Maksimilianovich Steinberg (1911-1960)
- Yuri Alexeyevich Vasnetsov
- Alexander Semyonovich Vedernikov (1898-1975)
- Alexandra Nikolayevna Yakobson
