= Mikhail Nikolaevich Skulyari =

Soviet artist (1905–1985)

Mikhail Nikolaevich Skulyari (Russian: Михаил Николаевич Скуляри; 26 June 1905 - 1985) was a Soviet artist. He was born in southern Russia. He was the grandson of Baron von Ek. Until 1917 he lived in Simferopol. He studied art in Irkutsk under I. Kopylov. Among his fellow students in Irkutsk were Minei Kuks and A.N. Yakobson. He then graduated from the Academy of Arts (1926–30), where he studied with Kuzma Petrov-Vodkin, Arkady Rylov, Pavel Shillingovsky and Dmitry Kiplik. He spent the Second World War in Dushanbe, Anzhero-Sudzhensk and Kolomna. He was associated with the artists' union RABIS and with the Red Army medical museum.

After 1946, he worked in the Leningrad Experimental Lithographic Workshop with a host of artists, among them Alexander Vedernikov, Georgy Vereisky, V.A. Vlasov, Yuri Vasnetsov, B.N. Ermolaev, Vera Matyukh, Valentin Kurdov, Anatoli Kaplan, Minei Kuks and A.N. Yakobson.

He died in 1985. His work was exhibited at the State Russian Museum in 2005 to mark the centenary of his birth. He was also shown in the Estorick Gallery in 2019 as part of an exhibition on the Leningrad lithographers.
