= Louise Braverman =

American architect

Louise Braverman is a New York City-based architect known for a design philosophy that aims to combine aesthetic design and social conscience. She is a Fellow of the American Institute of Architects (FAIA).

== Biography ==
Educated at the Yale School of Architecture, Braverman founded her own firm, Louise Braverman Architect, in New York City. Her firm has designed a number of notable buildings around the world, including the Village Health Works Staff Housing in Burundi and Centro de Artes Nadir Afonso in Portugal. Centro de Artes Nadir Afonso, an art museum, has been featured in the pivotal books, Destination Architecture: The Essential Guide to 1000 Contemporary Buildings and Breaking Ground: Architecture by Women, a visual survey of architecture designed by women from the early twentieth century to the present day. Braverman lectures frequently, discussing her work at such venues as Columbia GSAPP, The Plan Magazine Perspective USA, and at the Architectural League NY as an Emerging Voice. She described her architectural design approach in her keynote address at the 2017 AIA Iowa Convention and again in her 2020 in-depth interview with Julia Gamolina published on the noted website, MadameArchitect.org. and again in her 2023 lecture, Architecture of Art + Conscience at The National Arts Club. Braverman was invited to present the work of her firm at the 2023, 2021, 2018, 2016, 2014, and 2012 Venice Biennale of Architecture, at the Time Space Existence exhibitions as well as at OfficeUS Exhibit at the 2014 Venice Architecture Biennale United States Pavilion. She discussed her thoughts about how her six consecutive installations in Venice added insight to the evolution of her built architectural work in conversation with Martha Thorne at the AIA New York Chapter 2021 Cocktails and Conversation program. She also expressed how Venice is a source of her creative inspiration in her essay Dream of Venice Architecture.

== Notable works ==
Some of Braverman's notable works include award-winning sustainable housing center for health workers in a rural village in Burundi, Africa and the Centro de Artes Nadir Afonso Art Museum in Boticas, Portugal dedicated to the work of abstract artist Nadir Afonso. Centro de Artes Nadir Afonso was honored in 2025 by Interior Design Magazine as the “Best Museum “ built in the last twenty years.

Other projects that have gained attention from the media include CV Starr Hand Surgery Center in St. Luke's Roosevelt Hospital in New York City, Poets House, Derfner Judaica Museum, and Chelsea Court affordable housing. The Derfner Museum was noted as a significant cultural institution in 2025 by inclusion in both the Bloomberg Connects App as well as in NY2020: Architecture and Urbanism at the Beginning of a New Century Robert A. M. Stern’s critical book about transformative projects that shaped New York City.

== Selected projects ==
Architecture

- Pre-Fab Learning Landscape, 2016
- Centro de Artes Nadir Afonso Art Museum, 2013
- Village Health Works Staff Housing, 2013
- Derfner Judaica Museum, 2009
- Poets House Library + Learning Center, 2009
- Brooklyn Public Library, Highlawn Branch, 2006
- Pavel Zoubok Art Gallery, 2004
- Joe's Salon, 2003
- Chelsea Court Affordable Housing, 2003
- Maps + Movies at Grand Central Terminal, 1996-1997
- Poetic Light at Grand Central Terminal, 1996

Videos

- "Renovation=Renaissance", Time Space Existence Exhibit Venice Architecture Biennale, 2025
- "Layers", Time Space Existence Exhibit Venice Architecture Biennale, 2023
- "Hyperloop Suburb - Louise Braverman Architect", Time Space Existence Exhibit Venice Architecture Biennale, 2018
- "Active Voice", Venice Architecture Biennale Installation, 2016
- "Voices from Venice: Conversations at the 2014 Architecture Biennale with Women Who Practice Architecture", 2014
- "Kigutu in Formation", Venice Architecture Biennale Installation, 2012

== Awards ==
2023

- Rethinking the Future Third Award
- 2023 Best of Year Award Best in Class Interior Design Magazine
- The Plan Award Finalist

2022

- Architizer+ Best North American Firm Award Special Mention
- Chicago Athenaeum International Architecture Award Honorable Mention
- The Plan Award Finalist

2021

- Interior Design Best of Design Finalist
- Interior Design Best In Design Centro de Artes Nadir Afonso
- "Time Space Existence" Exhibitor at the 17th Venice Architecture Biennale

2020

- Interior Design Women in Design Award

2019

- Chicago Athenaeum International Architecture Award
- Chicago Athenaeum Green GOOD DESIGN Award

2018

- "Time Space Existence" Exhibitor at the 16th Venice Architecture Biennale
- Infinite Archive at New York Public Library Art Exhibition, 1 of 30 Selected Artists
- Frame Awards People's Choice Winner

2017

- NYCxDESIGN Award Honoree
- Architizer A+ Special Mention Award
- Chicago Athenaeum Green GOOD DESIGN Award

2016

- DAF 2016 Awards Second Award
- AIA Small Projects Awards
- Time Space Existence Exhibitor at the 15th Venice Architecture Biennale

2015

- Blueprint Awards Shortlist
- Architizer A+ Award Finalist
- ArchDaily Building of the Year Award Finalist
- AIA NY Chapter Design Award of Merit

2014

- Architect Magazine Annual Design Review Citation Award
- Architect Magazine Annual Design Review Honorable Mention Award
- The 14th Venice Architecture Biennale
- Re-Thinking the Future Sustainability Honorable Mention Award
- Chicago Athenaeum American Architecture Award
- AIANY State Award of Excellence
- AIANY State Award of Merit
- AIANY Chapter/Boston Society of Architects Housing Design Award
- Architizer A+ Special Mention Award

2013

- Chicago Athenaeum International Architecture Award
- Chicago Athenaeum GREEN GOOD DESIGN Award

2012

- The 13th Venice Architecture Biennale
- Chicago Athenaeum American Architecture Award

2010

- Chicago Athenaeum Green GOOD DESIGN Award

2009

- Chicago Athenaeum International Architecture Award

2008

- Elevated to Fellowship in the American Institute of Architects

2005

- Residential Architect Design Award of Merit

2004

- AIA NY Chapter/Boston Society of Architects Housing Design Award
- AIA National Housing Award

1997

- I.D. Annual Design Review Best of Category Award

1996

- The Architectural League Emerging Voices Award

1994

- AIA Long Island Chapter ARCHI Award
