= Mosaic (magazine) =

American online Jewish magazine

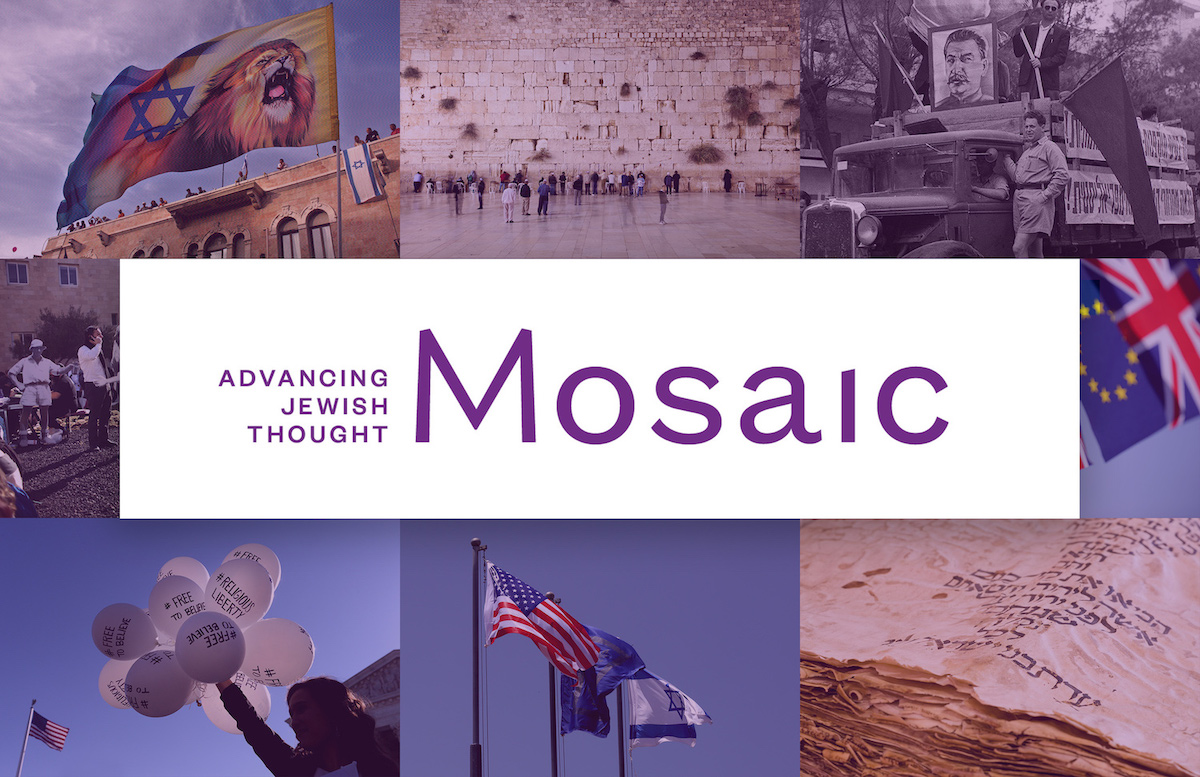
- Website type: Magazine
- Available in: English
- Owners: Bee.Ideas, LLC (The Tikvah Fund)
- Editor: Jonathan Silver
- Website: mosaicmagazine.com
- Commercial: Yes
- Launched: June 2013; 13 years ago

Mosaic is an online magazine of Jewish ideas, religion, politics, and culture which was established in June 2013.

An online subscription magazine, it offers full-length monthly essays "on an issue or theme of pressing significance for Jews, Judaism, or the Jewish state". Topics range from cultural or religious questions to social and philosophical issues, with in-depth responses to each essay appended throughout the month. In addition, Mosaic publishes a variety of briefer pieces offering comments on the news of the day, historical reflections, and more. Finally, a permanent fixture of Mosaic is its editors’ picks: a daily selection of the most urgent items, gathered from far-flung places around the web, and introduced in short summaries detailing their particular substance and import.

Authors who have published in Mosaic include: Leon Kass, Natan Sharansky, Meir Soloveichik, Ruth Wisse, Martin Kramer, Michael Doran, David Wolpe, Hillel Halkin, Matti Friedman, Elliott Abrams, Einat Wilf, John Bolton, Douglas Feith, Dore Gold, and Daniel Gordis. In addition, Mosaic carries the popular etymology column Philologos. Mosaic has also published articles by convicted Israeli spy Lawrence Franklin.

The editor is Jonathan Silver. Mosaic's founding editor, and now editor-at-large, is Neal Kozodoy.

It features right-wing writers such as Victor Davis Hanson advising Israel, over the Gaza genocide, that: "Militaries must return to the ancient confidence that it is better to kill more of the aggressors’ population than to have lost some of its own." A former spokesman for Benjamin Netanyahu, Ran Baratz, wrote that any distinction between Hamas and civilians in Gaza "is largely artificial," as they're all "barbarians" motivated by "jihadist, eliminationist anti-Semitism." Palestinians' longing, felt at the most senior levels, to recover their homes is never mentioned.
