= American Jewish World Service =

Nonprofit organization

- Abbreviation: AJWS
- Founded: May 1, 1985; 41 years ago
- Founders: Larry Phillips, Larry Simon
- Founded at: Boston, Massachusetts, U.S.
- Type: 501(c)(3)
- Tax ID no.: 22-2584370
- Legal status: Nonprofit organization
- Headquarters: New York, New York, U.S.
- Coordinates: 40.750656°N 73.985623°W
- President, Chief Executive Officer: Tawanda Mutasah
- Revenue: $44,917,779 (2024)
- Expenses: $42,880,101 (2024)
- Employees: 94 (2024)
- Volunteers: 29 (2024)
- Website: ajws.org

American Jewish World Service (AJWS) is a 501(c)(3) nonprofit international development and human rights organization that supports community-based organizations in Africa, Asia, Latin America, and the Caribbean. Inspired by the Jewish commitment to justice, AJWS works to realize human rights and end poverty.

Since its founding in 1985, AJWS has provided more than $500 million in grants to communities fighting for sexual health and rights, grappling with climate change, and building democratic movements. Unlike many peer organizations, AJWS recognizes the central role of local people devising their own solutions. It is the first and only Jewish organization dedicated solely to promoting human rights around the world. Its headquarters are in New York City. AJWS has received a Four-Star rating from Charity Navigator since 2002.

== Strategy ==
Supporting some 500 grassroots organizations every year, the organization’s grantmaking focuses on four issues: civil and political rights; land, water, and climate justice; sexual health and rights; and humanitarian response to disasters. AJWS deploys its three-part grants-multiplier model to strengthen and sustain human rights movements and advocate for government policies in the United States that will improve the lives of people around the world.

=== Grantmaking ===
AJWS grantmaking is guided by the belief that grassroots organizations are the best places to envision, articulate and implement solutions, and that community development cannot take place when human rights are denied. Often serving as an organization’s first funder, AJWS makes sustained investments over many years, offering flexible, long-term funding so its grantees can tackle complex challenges and pivot as on-the-ground conditions change.

=== Accompaniment ===
Everywhere AJWS works, its staff of human rights experts help grassroots organizations grow and strategize, bringing them together to collaborate and build massive social movements which mobilize the public to fight for their rights. These experts are normally drawn directly from the movements AJWS supports and partner with grantee organizations to identify other sources of funding, garner local support, and manage the practical needs of growing organizations with expertise in community relations, governance, and budgeting, among other areas.

=== Advocacy ===
AJWS works to promote awareness and influence U.S. international policies and funding in relation to human rights, global health and poverty, by rallying members of the community to advocate for policies that will improve the lives of millions of people in the developing world and build momentum for long-term change. Launched in 2025, the AJWS Action Network links supporters and advocates to both houses of Congress, issuing calls to elected representatives to support policies that encourage U.S. funding and action in defense of human rights.

AJWS maintains a presence in Washington, DC, working to stop, delay and mitigate new policies that undermine human rights abroad. Internationally, AJWS works to increase the quality and quantity of funds supporting grassroots groups so that said funds are flexible, longstanding and feminist in their approaches.

In 2026, AJWS's advocacy priorities include halting the expanded Global Gag Rule or Mexico City Policy, which extends legacy restrictions on U.S. support, blocking virtually all U.S. foreign assistance from reaching communities in need. AJWS also supports the Haitian Women and Girls Resolution, which would secure political participation of women and girls in Haiti, groups within Haiti that face the greatest adversity, and the Burma GAP Act, which supports the basic needs of Rohingya people exiled to refugee camps in Bangladesh.

== History ==
AJWS was established in Boston, Massachusetts, on May 1, 1985, when Larry Phillips and Larry Simon, together with a group of rabbis, Jewish communal leaders, activists, business people, scholars and others, came together to create the first American Jewish organization dedicated to alleviating poverty, hunger, and disease among people across the globe.

In her book, If I Am Not For Myself: The Liberal Betrayal of the Jews, Ruth Wisse argues that AJWS is one of a group of left-of-center Jewish organizations and publications founded in the 1980s without explaining why a new, specifically Jewish organization was needed to address causes already being addressed by well-established, American charities to which many Jewish were already contributors. Wisse argues that the actual motivation was a need felt by highly educated Jews to counter rising antisemitism on the left by performative acts of "public avowals of kindliness and liberalism. "

The organization's first key achievement was its response to a volcano disaster in Armaro, Colombia, in 1986. In 1990, after moving headquarters to New York City, AJWS launched five new international development projects in Mexico, Honduras, and Haiti, which provided training programs in sustainable agriculture. In 1991, then AJWS President Andrew Griffel was elected to the Executive Committee of InterAction, a consortium of over a hundred international humanitarian organizations.

Shortly after the September 11th attacks, AJWS responded by receiving donations and making grants to groups that provide support to families of low-income workers. In 2004, AJWS responded to the Indian Ocean tsunami, and co-founded the Save Darfur Coalition. In 2006, AJWS helped organize a rally in Washington, D.C., against genocide, and has since conducted a series of other rallies throughout the country. In 2010, AJWS responded to the earthquake in Haiti, raising nearly $6 million for Haitian-led recovery efforts, and in 2011 launched Reverse Hunger: Ending the Global Food Crisis, a campaign to reform U.S. food aid policy. In 2013, AJWS launched the “We Believe” campaign, a national advocacy campaign that called on the U.S. government to promote human rights in the developing world by ending violence against women and girls, stopping hate crimes against LGBT people, and ending child marriage. In recent years, AJWS has responded to the East Africa hunger crisis and the Rohingya refugee crisis by providing immediate humanitarian aid and long-term, sustainable support to affected populations.

== Leadership ==
AJWS's current president and chief executive officer is Tawanda Mutasah. A globally respected human rights leader and philanthropic strategist, Mutasah joined AJWS in 2026. Prior to AJWS, he served as Vice President of Global Partnerships & Impact at Oxfam America, responsible for strategic and operational leadership and as Senior Director for International Law and Policy at Amnesty International.

Mutasah maintains a strong commitment to teaching, thought-leadership, and board service. A graduate of Harvard Law School, New York University Law School, the Graduate School of Public & Development Management at the University of the Witwatersrand, and the University of Zimbabwe, Mutasah has taught international human rights law at the Paris School of International Affairs. He has served on governing and advisory boards, including the Center for Civilians in Conflict, Physicians for Human Rights, Crisis Action, Open Society Justice Initiative, and Rutgers University’s Center for Women’s Global Leadership, as well as African entities that include Trust Africa, and the Coalition for Dialogue on Africa.

In this role, Mutasah follows Robert Bank, who served as president and chief executive officer until 2026. A human rights attorney, activist and experienced organizational leader, Bank joined AJWS in 2009 as Executive Vice President, and was selected as president and CEO in 2016. Prior to joining AJWS, Bank served in New York’s municipal government and in the leadership of Gay Men’s Health Crisis—one of the world’s most highly regarded organizations engaged in combatting HIV/AIDS. In 2008, Bank played an instrumental role in the campaign to overturn bans on HIV-positive people entering the United States and on their becoming U.S. citizens.

Bank succeeded Ruth Messinger, who presided over the organization for 18 years. Messinger was formerly Manhattan Borough President and the Democratic nominee for Mayor of New York City in 1997. In late 2005, The Forward named Messinger in its annual "Forward 50" list of the most influential American Jews. Messinger returned to the Forward 50 in 2009, also the year she was invited to the White House to discuss the crisis in Darfur with President Barack Obama. Currently, she sits on the United States State Department's Religion and Foreign Policy Working Group and co-chairs the Sub-Working Group on Social Justice.

== Impact ==
AJWS provides $20 million annually to social justice organizations in 14 countries in Africa, Asia, Latin America, and the Caribbean, to address some of the gravest global problems, including early child marriage, violence against women and girls, the land and water rights of Indigenous people, and the sexual health and rights of LGBTQI+ people. Since its founding, AJWS has provided more than $500 million to support thousands of social justice organizations in the developing world that have taken on these challenges.
