= Simon Halkin =

Israeli writer (1899–1987)

- שמעון הלקין
- Born: 28 October 1898; Dovsk, Mogilev Governorate, Russian Empire
- Died: 19 November 1987 (aged 89); Jerusalem, Israel
- Citizenship: Israel
- Occupations: Writer and professor
- Relatives: Abraham Halkin (brother); Shmuel Halkin (cousin); Anna Schwartz (cousin)
- Writing career
- Language: English, Hebrew
- Notable awards: Bialik Prize (1967); Yakir Yerushalayim (1970); Israel Prize (1975)

Simon Halkin (Hebrew: שמעון הלקין) was a Jewish poet, novelist, teacher, and translator. He died in 1987.

== Biography ==
Simon Halkin, the brother of Abraham Halkin, was born in Dovsk near Rogachev (now in Belarus), then in the Russian Empire and emigrated to New York City with his family in 1914. He lived and studied in the United States from 1914 to 1932. He studied at the Hebrew Union College and Columbia University. In the US, he taught Hebrew Literature and Language.

In 1932, Halkin immigrated to the British Palestine. He worked as an English teacher in Tel Aviv from 1932 to 1939, but then returned to America, to become professor of Hebrew Literature at the Jewish Institute of Religion in New York. He made his final move to Israel in 1949, when he succeeded Joseph Klausner as Professor of Modern Hebrew Literature and became head of the department at the Hebrew University of Jerusalem.

After retiring from the Hebrew University he served as a professor of Jewish Studies at the Jewish Theological Seminary of America. He translated William Shakespeare, Walt Whitman, Percy Bysshe Shelley, and other writers from English into Hebrew.

He wrote six poetry collections, two novels, several short stories, and also literary criticism. His most famous book of poetry is On the Island (1946).

Halkin died in 1987 in Jerusalem, Israel.

== Awards ==
- In 1967, Halkin was awarded the Bialik Prize for literature.
- In 1970, he received the Yakir Yerushalayim (Worthy Citizen of Jerusalem) award.
- In 1975, he won the Israel Prize, in literature.

== See also ==
- List of Israel Prize recipients
- List of Bialik Prize recipients
