= The Jews of Silence =

1966 book by Elie Weisel

- First US edition (1966)
- Author: Elie Wiesel
- Translator: Neal Kozodoy
- Published: Holt, Rinehart & Winston
- Publication date: 1966
- Pages: 143
- OCLC: 000408687

The Jews of Silence: A Personal Report on Soviet Jewry is a 1966 non-fiction book by Elie Wiesel. The book is based on his travels to the Soviet Union during the 1965 High Holidays to report on the condition of Soviet Jewry. The work "called attention to Jews who were being persecuted for their religion and yet barred from emigrating."

== Synopsis ==
For two weeks in September 1965 during the Jewish High Holidays, Wiesel visited five cities in the Soviet Union to learn about the condition of Soviet Jewry in the post-Stalin era. Wiesel "concludes that despite the remorseless propaganda and harsh exactions of the government, soviet Jews still feel they share in the purpose and destiny of the Jewish people." At the end of the work, Wiesel elucidates the meaning of the book's title with his admonition of world Jewry's lack of advocacy on behalf of their Soviet coreligionists: "What torments me most is not the Jews of silence I met in Russia, but the silence of the Jews I live among today."

== Release ==
In 1966, excerpts from the book were published in L'Express and The Saturday Evening Post.

== Editions ==
The original edition had a 34-page "Historical Afterword on Soviet Jewry", written by the book's translator Neal Kozodoy.

== Reception ==
In The New York Times, Isaac Bashevis Singer praised the book as "one passionate outcry, both in content and style." In Commentary, Max Hayward wrote, "after reading this book nobody will be able to deny that the state of Russian Jewry remains a legitimate cause for concern in the outside world."

== Impact ==
According to Glenn Richter, the former national coordinator of the American organization Student Struggle for Soviet Jewry, The Jews of Silence helped galvanize the Soviet Jewry Movement. The Jews of Hope, a 1985 book by Martin Gilbert, was described as the spiritual successor to The Jews of Silence. A 2001 conference in Moscow entitled "From the Jews of Silence to the Jews of Triumph" discussed the triumph of the movement with the term "Jews of silence" used "to describe the state of affairs prior to the emergence of [the] movement".
