= Shmuel Halkin =

Soviet poet (1897–1960)

- שמואל האַלקין
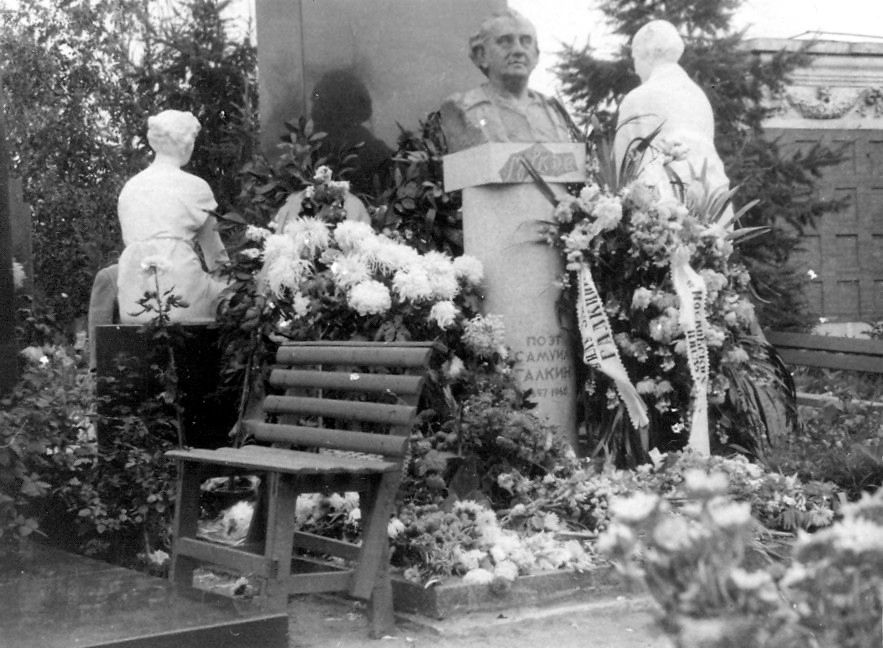
- Halkin's grave with sculptural likeness in Novodevichy Cemetery
- Born: Shmuel Zalmanovich Halkin; December 5, 1897; Rahachow, Russian Empire (now Belarus)
- Died: September 21, 1960 (aged 62); Moscow, Russian SFSR, Soviet Union (now Russia)
- Resting place: Novodevichy Cemetery
- Other name: Samuil Zalmanovich Galkin
- Occupation: Poet
- Relatives: Abraham Halkin (cousin); Simon Halkin (cousin)

Shmuel Zalmanovich Halkin (Yiddish: שמואל האַלקין; Belarusian: Самуіл Залманавіч Галкін, romanized: Samuil Zalmanavič Halkin; Russian: Самуил Залманович Галкин, romanized: Samuil Zalmanovich Galkin; December 5, 1897 – September 21, 1960), also known as Samuil Galkin, was a Soviet poet who wrote lyric poetry and translated many writers into Yiddish.

== Biography ==
Halkin was born in Rahachow, in what was then the Russian Empire (now Belarus) on December 5, 1897. He was the youngest of nine children in a Hasidic, Jewish household and a cousin of Simon and Abraham Halkin.

Halkin was interested in Jewish culture as a child, later as a young man he would become interested in painting and literature before ultimately deciding to become a poet. In his youth he wrote his poetry in Hebrew, but from 1921 onwards he wrote in Yiddish.

Halkin's first poems were published in 1917 in an anthology. He would then move to Moscow in 1922, after having lived in Kiyv for a year, where he published his debut collection Lider (Songs) with the help of David Hofstein. This would not only be the foundation of his career, but part of the foundation of Soviet Jewish poetry. These and his later works would earn his lyric poetry acclaim.

During World War II Halkin was a member of the Jewish Anti-Fascist Committee and served on the editorial board of its journal Eynikayt, during which he wrote about the Shoah. Halkin would develop a cordial relationship with fellow committee member and neighbor Peretz Markish. He was arrested in 1949 alongside other members of the committee but was spared execution alongside them in 1952, likely due to a heart attack he suffered while imprisoned that hospitalized him. He would go on to be released in 1955.

Along with his original works, Halkin was known for translating the poems of Pushkin, Yesenin, Blok, Mayakovsky, Shakespeare's tragedy King Lear into Yiddish. The last of which was directed by Sergei Radlov and produced at the Moscow State Jewish Theatre.

Halkin supported zionism, and would be criticized for his advocacy of Jewish nationalism.

Halkin died in Moscow, Soviet Union on September 21, 1960, on the second day of Rosh Hashanah. He was buried in Novodevichy Cemetery.

Following his death more of Halkin's works would be posthumously released, notably his work on the chorus of Mieczysław Weinberg's sixth symphony.

== Musical settings ==
- Mieczyslaw Weinberg: 6 Jewish Songs op.17 1944, in Yiddish.
