= Lanin (surname) =

Lanin is a surname. Notable people with the surname include:

- August Lanin (1925–2006), Russian architect and artist
- Howard Lanin (1897–1991), American bandleader, brother of Lester and Sam Lanin
- Lester Lanin (1907–2004), American bandleader, brother of Howard and Sam Lanin
- Oleg Lanin (born 1996), Russian football player
- Sam Lanin (1891–1977), American bandleader, brother of Howard and Lester Lanin
