= Byelitsk =

Settlement in Gomel Region, Belarus

Byelitsk Беліцк (Belarusian) Белицк (Russian)
- Settlement
- Location within Belarus
- Coordinates: 52°56′20″N 30°24′42″E
- Country: Belarus
- Region: Gomel Region
- District: Rahachow District
- Time zone: UTC+3 (MSK)

Byelitsk (Belarusian: Беліцк, romanized: Bielick; Russian: Белицк, romanized: Belitsk) is a settlement in Rahachow District, Gomel Region, Belarus. Until 2011, it was an urban-type settlement (a work settlement). It is part of Stolpnya selsoviet.
