= Philologos =

English-language newspaper column about etymology of Jewish languages

Philologos was an etymology column about Yiddish, Hebrew and Jewish words and phrases that ran from 1988 to 2025. Its anonymous author is known to be translator Hillel Halkin.

== Publishing history ==
The column first appeared in the first issue of the weekly magazine of The Nation, an English Israeli daily, on September 2, 1988.

After The Nation ceased to be published, the column ran weekly for over 24 years in The Forward, appearing there for the last time on December 7, 2014. The previous day Jane Eisner, the then Editor-in-Chief, penned a tribute to, and announced the retirement of, "the person known as Philologos" from The Forward. At the end of his column the following message appeared: After more than 24 years filing his weekly column, Philologos has decided to retire from the Forward. This will be his last column.

However, a month later, Mosaic announced that Philologos had joined the magazine, and his articles would appear biweekly. They started appearing, still anonymously, on January 14, 2014.

In September 2025, the column appeared for the last time.

== Identity ==
Philologos is a pseudonym. The Forward was careful to protect his anonymity. He continued to write anonymously at Mosaic starting in 2015.

For many years, there was speculation about the identity of the author. Mira Sucharov of Canadian Jewish News wrote in 2016 that "Philologos" is a pseudonym of Hillel Halkin, and Edward Alexander expressed conviction in 2017 that Halkin was the column's author.

Halkin confirmed in August 2021 that he penned the columns. Even after confirming his authorship, Halkin continued to write the column without reference to his own identity, saying that Philologos had "an independent status as a fictional character" Halkin invented and "often says things or goes out on a limb by expressing crazy things" that Halkin would not express in his own name.

== See also ==
- On Language, a wide-ranging weekly English language-usage column, that ran for decades in the New York Times Magazine
