= Vera Matyukh =

Russian artist (1910–2003)

Vera Fedorovna Matyukh
- Born: 1910; Berlin, Germany
- Died: 2003; St. Petersburg, Russia
- Education: Kharkiv State School of Art, Kharkiv, Ukraine
- Known for: Lithography, painting, watercolor, etching, drawing, illustration
- Movement: Avant-garde

Vera Fedorovna Matyukh (Russian: Вера Фёдоровна Матюх; 1910–2003) was a Russian visual artist from Berlin. She worked in multiple mediums, including watercolor, lithography, etching, illustration, and drawing.

She was born in Berlin to a German mother and a Russian father. She lived there until 1923, when her family then moved to Kharkiv. She studied at the Kharkiv State School of Art in the late 1920s with Vasili Ermilov. She lived and worked in Leningrad in the 1930s. She was influenced by Russian avant-garde movements such as Constructivism and artists such as Mikhail Matyushin, Pavel Filonov, Kazimir Malevich and her mentor Pavel Kondratiev. She also studied with Lev Yudin, Konstantin Rozhdestvensky, Georgi Vereisky and Nikolai Tyrsa.

After the war, she was a member of the Leningrad Experimental Graphics Workshop along with Aleksandr Vedernikov, Anatoli Kaplan, and Boris Ermolaev. She lived and worked in Leningrad. She was known for her work with coloured lithography. In 1961, Eric Estorick brought the works of the LEGL school to the world's attention through famous exhibitions in London and New York.

Her works are held in various museum collections, including the State Tretyakov Gallery, State Russian Museum, St. Petersburg History Museum, Anna Akhmatova Literary and Memorial Museum, the Derfner Judaica Museum, the Tsarskoselskaya Kolleksiya Museum in St. Petersburg, and the Museum of Modern Art in New York.

The St. Petersburg art historian Nikolai Kononikhin wrote a book on her life titled Faith: The Life and Creativity of Vera Matyukh, with the support of the Frants Art Foundation.
