= Dovsk =

Agrotown in Gomel Region, Belarus

Dovsk Доўск (Belarusian) Довск (Russian)
- Agrotown
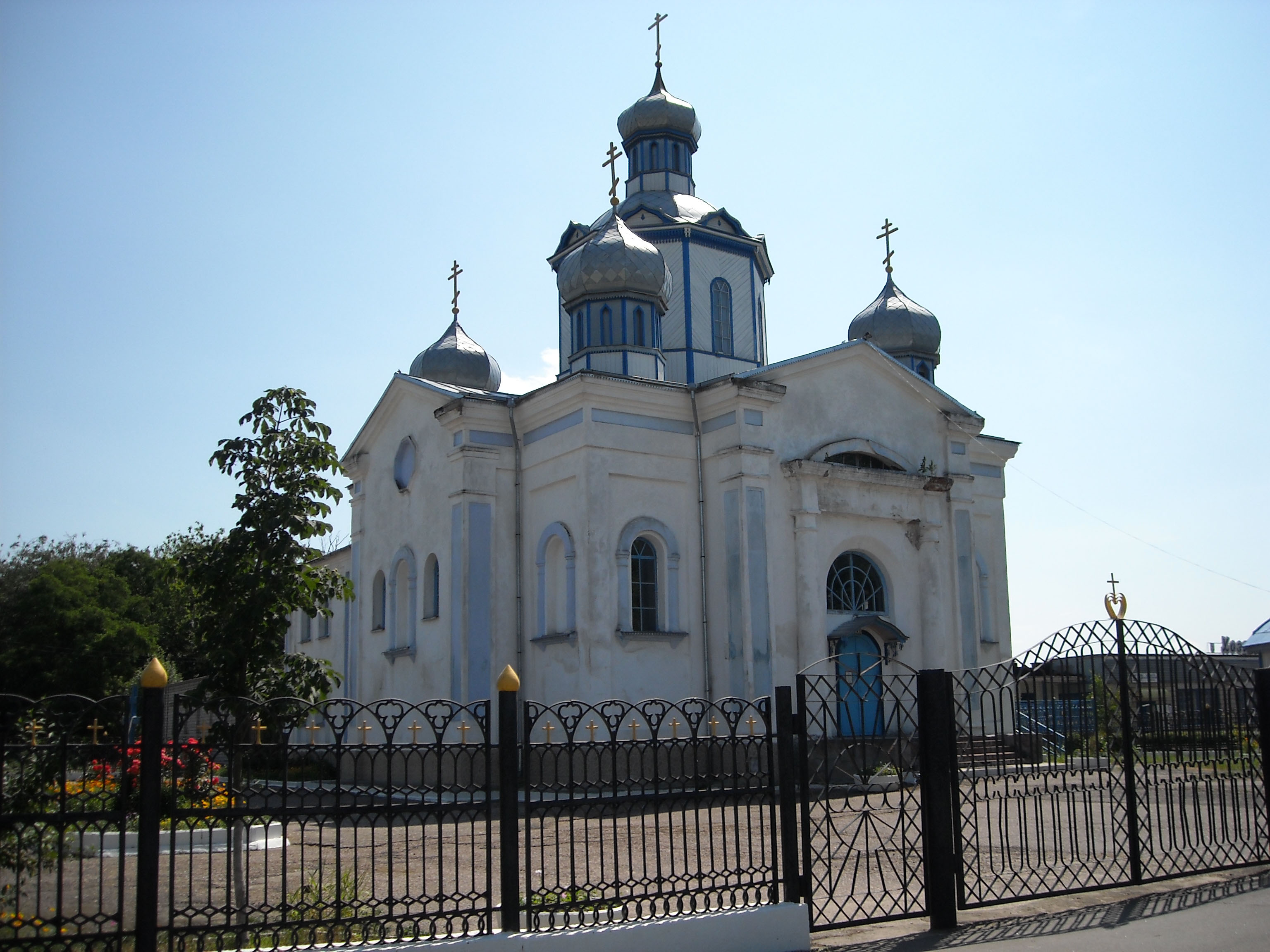

- Location within Belarus
- Coordinates: 53°9′25″N 30°27′36″E
- Country: Belarus
- Region: Gomel Region
- District: Rahachow District
- Founded: 19th century

Population (2012)
  - Total: 1,841

Dovsk or Dowsk (Belarusian: Доўск, romanized: Doŭsk; Russian: Довск) is an agrotown in Rahachow District, Gomel Region, Belarus. It serves as the administrative center of Dovsk selsoviet. Clay deposits are located near town, and it is bordered by forest from east and west.

== History ==
=== Before 1900 ===
Burial mounds (27) discovered by archaeologists, on the southwestern outskirts date to the ancient times.

After the First Partition of Poland (1772) it became part of the Russian Empire.

In 1850, the St. Petersburg - Kiev highway passed through the village. According to the revision of 1858, it was the property of D.P. Turcheninov. In 1860, the post office was moved to Dovsk from Yamnoye, at the crossroads of trade routes. In 1864, in the heart of the village at the old church site known since 1836, the brick Dovsk Holy Intercession Church was built. The center of spiritual life moved there from Malashkovichi village.

An ongoing sugar production business began operating in 1876. The landowner owned over 2,200 acres of land and a tavern. A grain mill and an emergency grain warehouse have been operating since 1879. Dovsk was the center of the Dovsk volost until 9 May 1923. In 1890, it included 52 settlements with 1,966 households.

In 1898, the agricultural association of the Rogachev district organized an exhibition of stallions.

=== Since 1900 ===
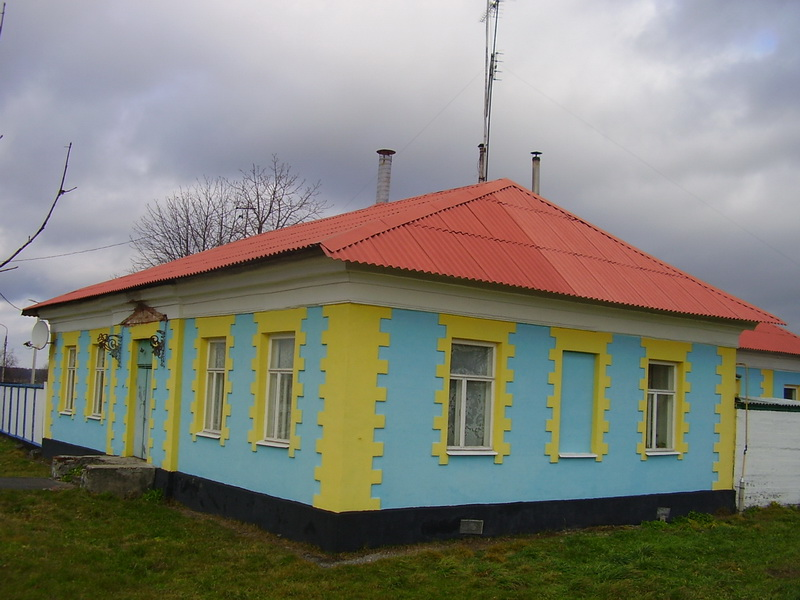
A building in Dovsk

In 1909, Dovsk consisted of 2,478 acres of land. In 1910 the village reached 91 settlements with 2,766 households. Nearby was the Dovsk khutor (then called Minina), which took up 485 acres of land, a post office spread over 680 acres, and the New World estate, where the Dovsk volost administration was located. 4 distilleries, a post and telegraph office, a school, an emergency room, and a liquor store were there.

In 1920, during the Polish–Soviet War, 12 Red Army soldiers were killed. They are buried inside two mass graves. In 1930, a collective farm named after K. E. Voroshilov was organized, there was a working forge. In 1935, the Church of the Intercession of the Holy Mother of God was closed.

On 14 August 1941, the village fell under Nazi control.

Until 1969, Staraya Serebryanka village was part of the Dovsk village council, and urban settlement Yanovka (no longer exists) was part of the same until 1975. In July 1990, the church building was handed over to the Orthodox community. The building is a monument of pseudo-classical architecture. In 2003, a cross was erected near the church in gratitude to the people of Belarus who helped people of Ukraine fleeing the Soviet famine of 1932–1933. That cross is the only monument in Belarus commemorating the Holodomor.

== Geography ==
It is located 31 km north-east from the regional center and the Rogachev railway station (on the Mogilev-Zhlobin line), 80 km from Gomel.

== Transport ==
The village hosts the intersection of Mogilev -- Gomel and Bobruisk—Moscow highways.

== Structures ==
Local buildings mainly consist of wooden architecture. The city is densely built-up with buildings along the Rogachev-Dovsk road.

== Demographics ==
- 1858 - 26 households, 180 inhabitants.
- 1909 - 62 households, 489 inhabitants; on the farm Dovsk (a.k.a. Minina) 4 yards, 10 inhabitants; at the postal station there are 32 yards,
- 192 inhabitants.
- 1940 - 331 yards, 1303 inhabitants.
- 1959 - 993 inhabitants (according to the census).
- 2004 - 731 households, 1841 inhabitants
