= On Language =

Column in New York Times Magazine

On Language is a regular column in the weekly New York Times Magazine on the English language discussing popular etymology, new or unusual usages, and other language-related topics. The inaugural column was published on February 18, 1979 and it was a regular popular feature. Many of the columns were collected in books.

Columnist and journalist William Safire was one of the most frequent contributors from the inception of the column until Safire's death in 2009. He wrote the inaugural On Language column in 1979. starting it with the greeting: "How do you do. This is a new column about language." In more than 30 years, he contributed more than 1300 installments to the column.

Safire was succeeded by Ben Zimmer, who wrote the column until its final edition on February 25, 2011..

About the cancellation of the column, the incoming editor of New York Times Magazine Hugo Lindgren explained this and other changes to the magazine: "It is mine now. I'm in charge. We're going to be doing some significant redesign work, and have a newish magazine by the end of January. The big thing is, I want to create a kind of new identity for the front-of-the-book section. That doesn't mean that everything's being tossed out. We're looking at everything and evaluating what sort of fits."

On April 2, 2026, New York Times Magazine editor Jake Silverstein announced that as part of a redesign of the magazine On Language would be returning as a regular feature, written by Nitsuh Abebe.

== See also ==
- Philologos, another wide-ranging, long-term language column, weekly for most of its run, specializing in Jewish words (primarily Hebrew and Yiddish)
