= Poets House =

Library in New York City

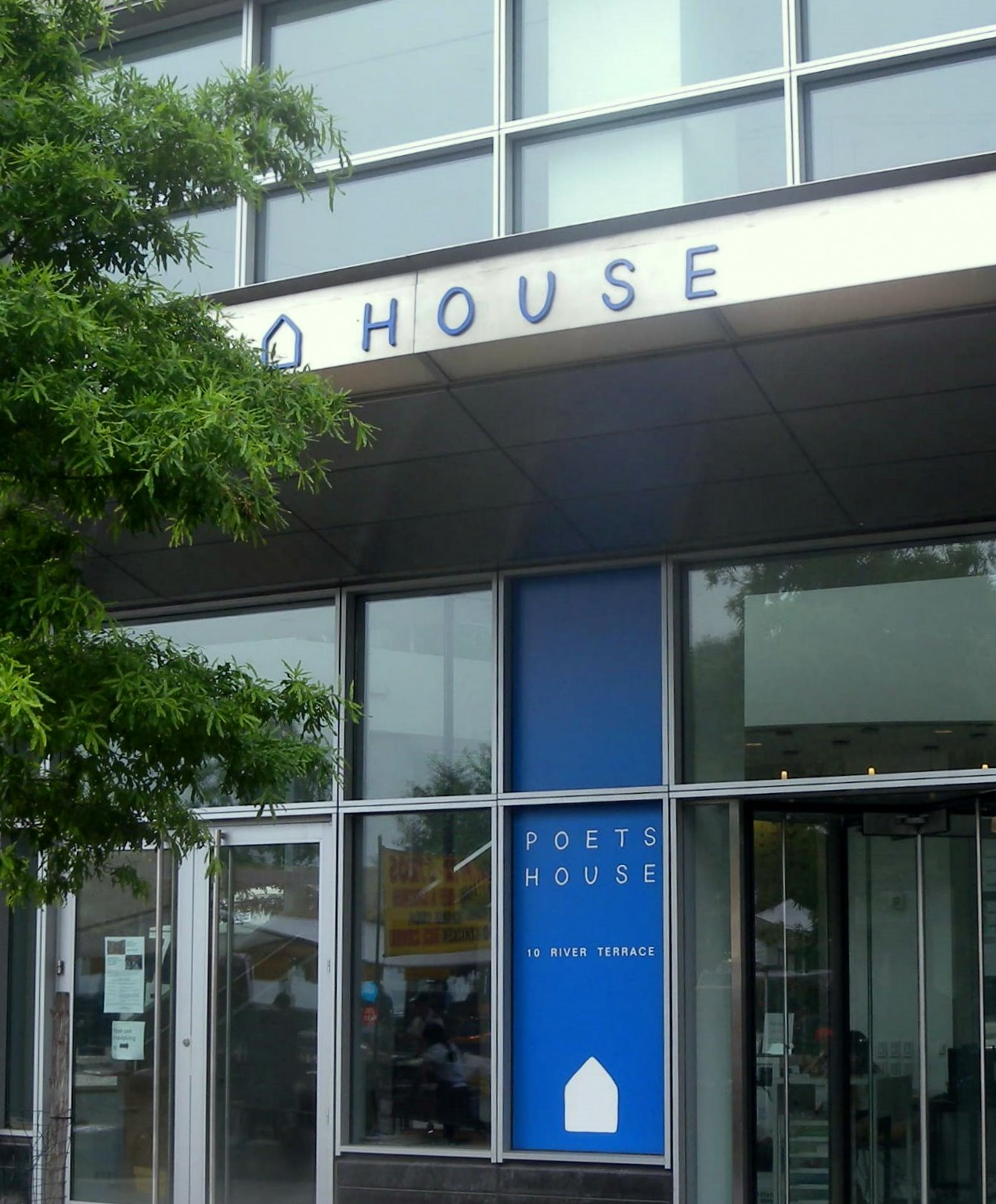
- Entrance (2011)
- Formation: 1985; 40 years ago
- Type: Poetry library
- Legal status: Public
- Location: New York City
- Website: www.poetshouse.org

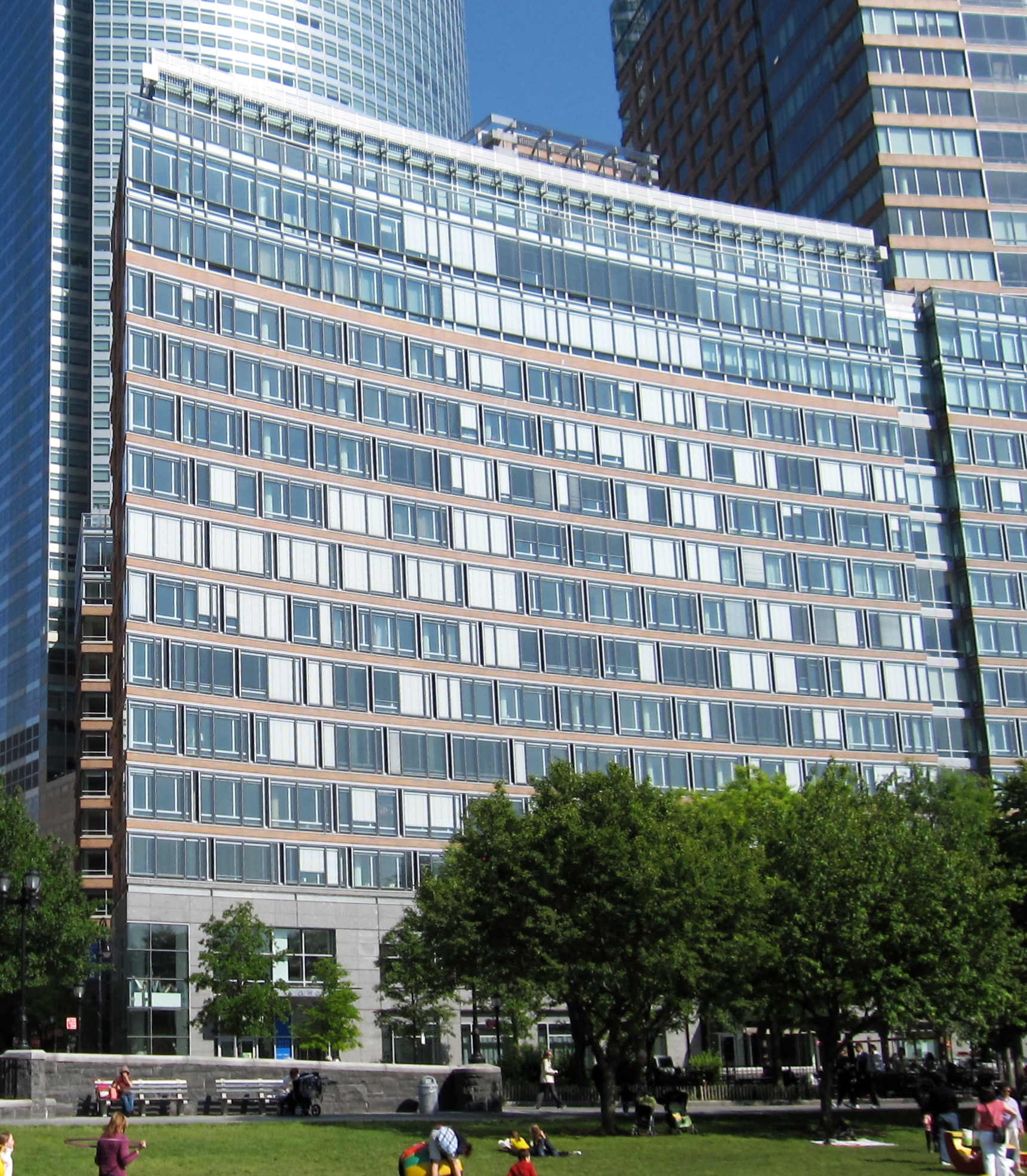
10 River Terrace (2010)

Poets House is a national literary center and poetry library based in New York City, United States. It contains more than 80,000 volumes of poetry, and is free and open to the public. Following the COVID-19 pandemic, in November 2020, operations were temporarily suspended.

== History ==
Poets House was founded in 1985 by the late Stanley Kunitz, two-time poet laureate of the United States, and arts administrator Elizabeth Kray. With holdings of more than 80,000 volumes, Poets House contains virtually all poetry books published in the U.S. since 1990, as well as many that are out of print and date to the early 20th Century. It also contains literary journals and chapbooks (small books of poetry), and many audiotapes, videotapes, CDs, and DVDs of poetry readings from the mid-twentieth century through today. Visitors to Poets House can hear the voices of Walt Whitman, E. E. Cummings, William Carlos Williams, Sylvia Plath and hundreds of other poets.

In 2005, it was among 406 New York City arts and social service institutions to receive part of a $20-million grant from the Carnegie Corporation, which was made possible through a donation by New York City mayor Michael Bloomberg.

In 1996, the literary newspaper Poetry Flash called Poets House "The House That Holds A Country," a reference to its dedication to being a caretaker of the nation's poetic heritage.

In November 2020, Poets House announced it was suspending operations as a result of the economic impact of COVID-19. In 2021, the building was damaged by a flood, although the library was intact. It reopened in January 2024.

== Building ==
In 2009, Poets House moved from its longstanding location in SoHo to an eco-friendly "green" building at Ten River Terrace in Lower Manhattan's Battery Park City. The move was facilitated via long-term lease awarded by the Battery Park City Authority.

The space's interiors were designed by architect Louise Braverman, and is on two floors covering 11,000 square feet (1,000 m^{2}) that opens onto an extension of Teardrop Park.
