= Tawanda Mutasah =

Tawanda Mutasah (born 1970) is a lawyer, human rights advocate, and serves as President and Chief Executive Officer of American Jewish World Service (AJWS).

== Biography ==
Mutasah joined AJWS in 2026. Prior to that, he was Senior Director for Law and Policy at the Amnesty International, International Secretariat, leading the global movement's work on policy development, and its contributions to and interpretations of international human rights law and international humanitarian law. He trained in law at Harvard University, New York University and the University of Zimbabwe, and holds a management degree from the University of the Witwatersrand in Johannesburg. He has worked for Oxfam Great Britain as a spokesman on African issues, and previously directed OSISA, the Open Society Initiative for Southern Africa.

He speaks and writes on human rights, transparency, democratic governance, rule of law, and economic justice issues.

Mutasah has served as a governing board member for the Coalition for Dialogue on Africa, convened by the African Development Bank, African Union, and UN Economic Commission for Africa.
