= Hillel Halkin =

American-born Israeli translator, biographer, literary critic, and novelist

Hillel Halkin (Hebrew: הלל הלקין; born 1939) is an American-born Israeli translator, biographer, literary critic, and novelist who has lived in Israel since 1970.

== Biography ==
Hillel Halkin was born in New York City two months before the outbreak of World War II. He was the son of Abraham S. Halkin, then a professor of Jewish literature, history, and culture at the Jewish Theological Seminary of America, and his wife Shulamit, a daughter of Rabbi Meir Bar-Ilan. In 1970, he made aliyah to Israel and settled in Zikhron Ya'akov. He studied English literature at Columbia University.

Halkin is married to Marcia and is the father of two daughters.

== Literary career ==
Halkin translates Hebrew and Yiddish literature into English. He has translated Sholem Aleichem's Tevye the Dairyman, and major Hebrew and Israeli novelists, among them Yosef Haim Brenner, S. Y. Agnon, Shulamith Hareven, A. B. Yehoshua, Amos Oz, and Meir Shalev.

Halkin won a National Jewish Book Award in 1978 for his first original book Letters to an American Jewish Friend: A Zionist's Polemic (1977). He expressed why American Jews should immigrate to Israel.

Halkin's second book, Across the Sabbath River (2002), is a work of travel literature in which he goes in search of the truth behind the mystery of the Ten Lost Tribes. He became increasingly interested in the Bnei Menashe—who began to immigrate to Israel from India in the late 20th century—and helped to arrange DNA testing for the group in 2003 in Haifa. Since then, he has written A Strange Death: a novel based on the local history of Zikhron Ya'akov, where he resides. His intellectual biography of Yehuda Halevi won a 2010 National Jewish Book Award.

In 2012, Halkin published his first novel, Melisande! What Are Dreams? The critic D. G. Myers described it as a "unique and moving study of marriage, a love letter to conjugal love."

In 2014, Halkin published a new biography of Ze'ev Jabotinsky.

Halkin writes frequently on Israel and Jewish culture and politics. His articles have been published in Commentary, The New Republic, The Jerusalem Post, and other publications. He is a member of the editorial board of the Jewish Review of Books.

Halkin is the author of the Philologos column, originally in The Forward, and later in Mosaic. The American literary critic, Edward Alexander, identified him as the author of the column. Mira Sucharov of Canadian Jewish News claimed that "Philologos" is Halkin's pseudonym. Halkin later admitted to being the author.

== Published works ==
=== Books ===
- Halkin, Hillel (1977). Letters to an American Jewish Friend: A Zionist's Polemic. Philadelphia: Jewish Publication Society. ISBN 978-0-8276-0207-6.
- Across the Sabbath River: In Search of a Lost Tribe of Israel. New York: Houghton Mifflin Harcourt. 2002. ISBN 978-0-618-02998-3.
- A Strange Death. New Milford, Connecticut: Toby Press. 2010. ISBN 978-1-59264-280-9.
- Yehuda Halevi. New York: Nextbook/Schocken Books. 2010. ISBN 978-0-8052-4206-5.
- Melisande! What Are Dreams?. London: Granta. 2012. ISBN 978-1-84708-499-6.
- Jabotinsky: a life. Jewish Lives. New Haven, Connecticut: Yale University Press. 2014. ISBN 978-0-30013-662-3.

=== Translations ===
- Geulah Cohen (1966). Woman of Violence: Memoirs of a Young Terrorist, 1943–1948. New York: Holt, Rinehart and Winston.
- Yosef Haim Brenner (1971). Breakdown and Bereavement. Ithaca, New York: Cornell University Press.
- Mordecai Ze'ev Feuerberg (1973). Whither? and Other Stories. Philadelphia: Jewish Publication Society.
- Leah Goldberg (1973). Russian Literature in the Nineteenth Century. Jerusalem: Magnes Press, Hebrew University.
- Shulamith Hareven (1977). City of Many Days. Garden City, New York: Doubleday.
- Hanokh Bartov (1978). Whose Little Boy Are You? Philadelphia: Jewish Publication Society.
- Amos Oz (1985). A Perfect Peace. San Diego: Harcourt Brace Jovanovich.
- Sholem Aleichem (1987). Tevye the Dairyman and The Railroad Stories. New York: Schocken Books.
- Tamar Bergman (1988). The Boy from Over There. Boston: Houghton Mifflin.
- Shulamith Hareven (1988). The Miracle Hater. San Francisco: North Point Press.
- Meir Shalev (1991). The Blue Mountain. New York: HarperCollins.
- A. B. Yehoshua (1992). Mr. Mani. New York: Doubleday.
- Uri Orlev (1993). Lydia, Queen of Palestine. Boston: Houghton Mifflin.
- Uri Orlev (1995). The Lady with the Hat. Boston: Houghton Mifflin.
- Uri Orlev (1995). The Man from the Other Side. New York: Puffin Books.
- Nava Semel (1995). Flying Lessons. New York: Simon & Schuster Books for Young Readers.
- Shulamith Hareven (1996). Thirst: The Desert Trilogy. San Francisco: Mercury House.
- Roman Frister (1999). The Cap: The Price of a Life. New York: Grove Press.
- S. Y. Agnon (2000). A Simple Story. Syracuse, New York: Syracuse University Press.
- Samuel HaNagid (2000). Grand Things to Write a Poem On: A Verse Autobiography. Jerusalem: Gefen Publishing House.
- Haim Sabato (2003). Adjusting Sights. New Milford, Connecticut: Toby Press.
- Uri Orlev (2003). Run, Boy, Run. Boston: Houghton Mifflin.
- A. B. Yehoshua (2003). The Liberated Bride. Orlando, Florida: Harcourt.
- Haim Be'er (2004). Feathers. Waltham, Massachusetts: Brandeis University Press.
- A. B. Yehoshua (2004). Five Seasons. Orlando: Harcourt.
- A. B. Yehoshua (2006). A Woman in Jerusalem. Orlando, Florida: Harcourt.
- S. Y. Agnon (2009). To This Day. New Milford, Connecticut: Toby Press.
- Uri Orlev (2010). The Song of the Whales. Boston: Houghton Mifflin Books for Children.
