= If I Am Not For Myself =

1992 book by Ruth Wisse

If I Am Not for Myself: The Liberal Betrayal of the Jews
- Author: Ruth Wisse
- Publisher: Free Press
- Publication date: 1992
- Pages: 225
- ISBN: 978-0743229616

If I Am Not For Myself: The Liberal Betrayal of the Jews is a 1992 book by Ruth Wisse.

== Synopsis ==
Literary scholar Edward Alexander describes Wisse's book as an effort to explain how Arabs, having refused to accept a partition of Mandatory Palestine or creation of a Jewish state and launched a long war of terrorist attacks interspersed with full-scale invasions and boycotts, now accuse Israel being the aggressor, a process of inversion in which Zionism, the Jewish aspiration for a homeland, was, in Wisse's words, "declared racist because it deprived Palestinian Arabs of their homeland."

In If I Am Not For Myself Wisse, who describes liberalism as belief in progress, rationality, freedom, cultural pluralism and the rule of law, explores the reasons why liberalism failed to save the Jews of Europe from the Holocaust. "Liberals," she argues, "trust that all human problems are amenable to negotiated solutions, that all people are united in a spirit of brotherhood... They detest the use of force, not only for the damage it causes but because in admitting the limits of reason it throws humankind back to a more primitive stage of civilization. The pure liberal spirit precludes the possibility of intractable hatred or intransigent political will." Liberalism, she argues, could not protect Jews from Nazi Germany. Liberals according to Wisse, were unsympathetic to Jews, "not because of any personal antipathy but because the national fate of the Jews contradicted their view of the world and called into question their deepest assumptions."

Bringing her argument into the post-war period, Wisse argues that anti-Israel Arabs began to persuade Western liberals of the justice in opposing and seeking to destroy the Jewish state when they "exchanged the language of the right for the language of the left, presenting Israel as the bloodthirsty exploiter of impoverished innocent Arab masses... Since democratic society does not want to perceive itself as heartless or collaborationist, those who court favor with the Arabs have to deny the (Palestinian Arab) war against the Jewish state or else justify their betrayal of the Jews in a language of moral convenience. The tilt toward the Arabs has the code name of evenhandedness."

According to Larry Zolf, in his 1992 book In Search Of Anti-Semitism, William F. Buckley Jr. coyly suggests "Let us concede that some critics of Israel are, in fact, anti-Semites," but Wisse is blunt, stating that, "Given the asymmetry between the hunter and his prey, it is easier (for liberals) to resent the Jews than to oppose the anti-Semites," and "Liberalism may have been the kindly offspring of Christianity in Europe but anti-Semitism was its nastier stepchild."

== Critical response ==
In Zolf's estimate, although Wisse's book includes "the steamiest epilogue to an intellectual essay ever written by human hand. Suddenly, the reader finds himself or herself admitted to Wisse's adulterous affair with an adulterous Canadian turned Israeli, an affair carried out on the way to the top and right on the top – of Mt. Sinai," it is "often prolix and always humorless."

Edward Alexander calls If I Am Not For Myself "one of the most important Jewish books of the past 50 years."
