= Abraham Halkin =

Israeli historian (1904–1990)

- Абрахам Соломон Га́лкин
- Born: Abraham Solomon Halkin; 1904; Russian Empire
- Died: March 9, 1990 (aged 86); Jerusalem, Israel
- Children: Hillel Halkin
- Relatives: Simon Halkin; Shmuel Halkin

Academic background
- Education: Columbia University

Academic work
- Discipline: Jewish literature, history, and culture
- Institutions: Jewish Theological Seminary of America

Abraham Solomon Halkin (Russian: Абрахам Соломон Га́лкин; 1904 – March 9, 1990) was a Jewish history professor who was the brother of Simon Halkin and cousin of Shmuel Halkin.

== Biography ==
Halkin was born in 1904 in the Russian Empire, the younger brother of Simon Halkin. He is also the cousin of Shmuel Halkin.

In 1914, at the age of 11, Halkin immigrated to the United States from his native Russia. He would go on to receive his bachelor's, master's and doctoral degrees from Columbia University.

Halkin began teaching at the Jewish Theological Seminary of America in 1930. From 1938 to 1970 he also served as professor of Hebrew at City College of New York. He would serve as professor emeritus at the seminary after retiring in 1977. That same year he made aliyah to Israel.

Halkin was known to be one of the few familiar with an Apologetic Letter of rabbi Jedaia ha - Penini. He also was a noted scholar of Shmuel Yosef Agnon's writing, having taught it in his lectures.

Halkin died on March 9, 1990, in Jerusalem, Israel at 86 years of age from pneumonia, survived by his son and daughter. His son Hillel Halkin, would go on to serve as a prominent Hebrew writer.
