= Holy Intercession Church, Dovsk =

Dovsk Holy Intercession Church, Belarus

Holy Intercession Church
- Царква Покрыва Прысвятой Багародзіцы (Belarusian)
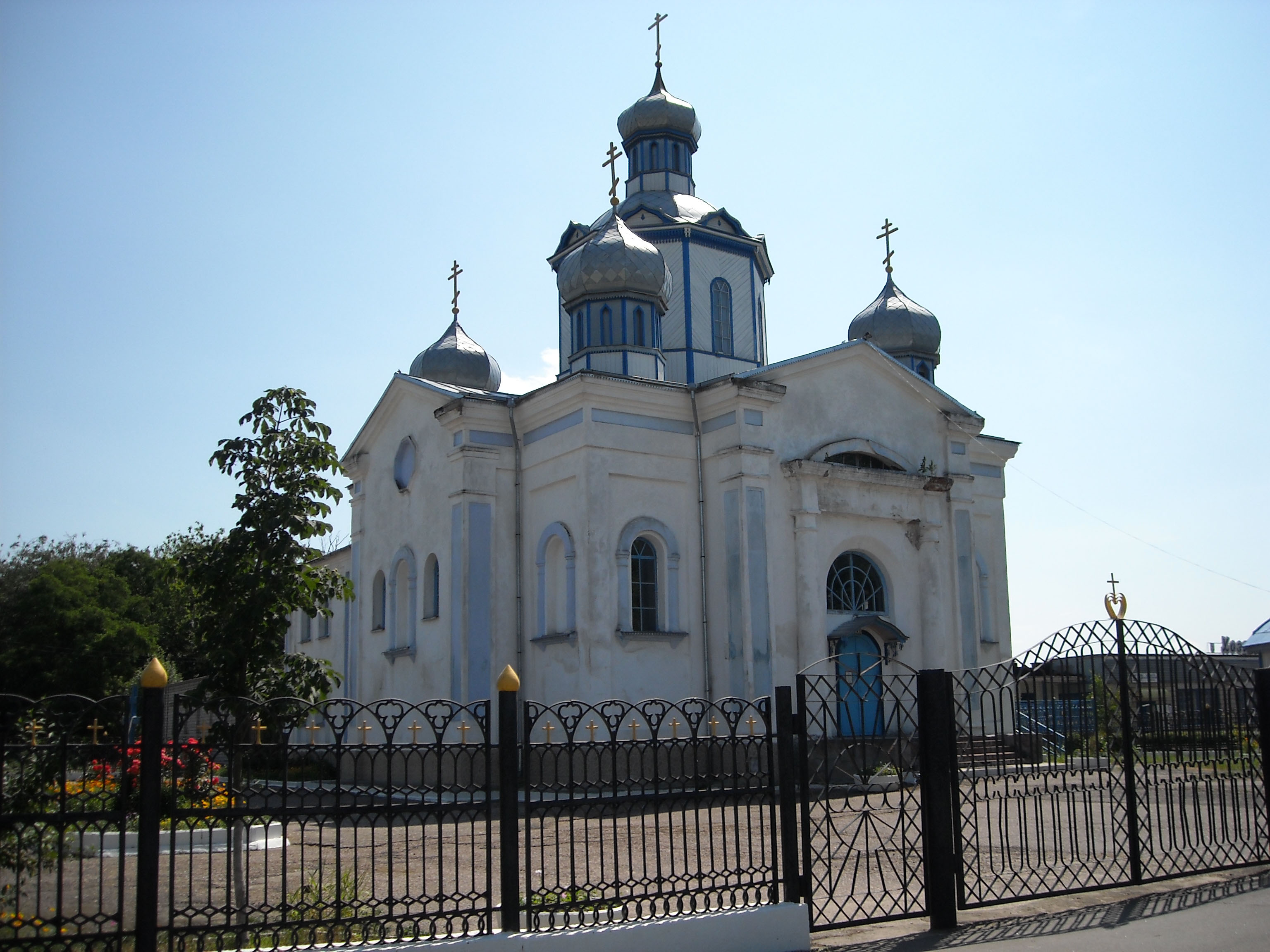

Religion
- Affiliation: Orthodox
- Status: Active

Location
- Location: Dovsk, Belarus
- Interactive map of Holy Intercession Church

Architecture
- Type: Church
- Groundbreaking: 1864
- Type: Cultural

Website
- dovsk.cerkov.ru

Dovsk Church of the Intercession of the Most Holy Theotokos was built in 1864. Prior to this, the nearest church was located in the village of Malashkovichi. In 1860 clergyman Anthony Yurkevich served here.

In 1860 the postal station was transferred from the village of Yamnoye to the village of Dovsk, and in the same year a church burned down in the village of Malashkovichi.

After the uprising of 1863–1864, the federal government financed the construction of Orthodox churches throughout Belarus. As part of this program, funds were allocated for the construction of a new temple in Malashkovichi, but natural forces decided to build it in Dovsk.

In 1935, the church was closed and used for economic purposes. Within the walls of the building there was a warehouse, a shop, a restaurant.

In July 1990, it was transferred by the district executive committee to the Orthodox community. Now the church has a Sunday school and a library.

This temple is a monument of pseudo-classical architecture.

== Shrines ==
- A particle of the relics of the Orthodox John of Kormyansky.
- Gift icon of the twelfth feasts of the end of the 18th century
- Icon of the Savior from the burnt church in Stary Krivsk
