= Ruth Wisse =

Canadian scholar of Yiddish literature

Ruth R. Wisse
- רות װײַס
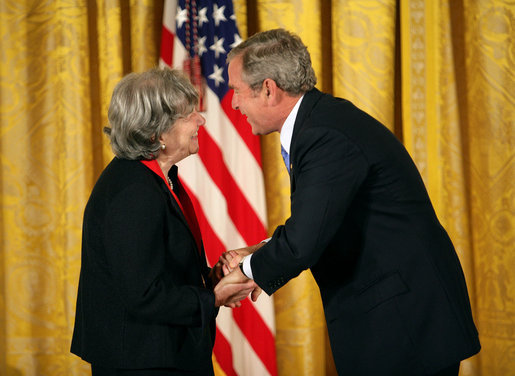
- Wisse receiving the National Medal of Arts and National Humanities from President George W. Bush (2007)
- Born: Ruth Roskies; May 13, 1936 (age 90); Czernowitz, Romania (present-day Ukraine)
- Education: McGill University (BA); Columbia University (MA); McGill University (PhD)
- Occupations: Historian; researcher; author; translator

Ruth Wisse (/waɪs/; Yiddish: רות װײַס; née Roskies; born May 13, 1936) is a Canadian academic and political activist. She is the Martin Peretz Professor of Yiddish Literature and Professor of Comparative Literature at Harvard University emerita. Wisse is a scholar of Yiddish literature and of Jewish history and culture.

Wisse is an outspoken Zionist. Some have called her political views neoconservative. In 2026, The Wall Street Journal called Wisse the "Iron Lady of the American Jewish Right".

== Background and family ==
Wisse was born into a Jewish family in Czernowitz (then part of Romania, now part of Ukraine) and grew up in Montreal. She earned her MA from Columbia University and, in 1969, her PhD from McGill University. She is the sister of David G. Roskies, professor of Yiddish and Jewish literature at the Jewish Theological Seminary of America.

== Academic career ==
Wisse, whose doctorate was in literature, is described by Edward Alexander as one of a group of scholars who earned PhDs in English literature in the 1960s and moved into Jewish Studies in the 1970s and 1980s, applying the modern critical methods of literary scholarship to Yiddish and Hebrew texts.

Wisse has taught at McGill, Stanford, New York, Hebrew and Tel Aviv universities. While teaching at McGill she developed a "pioneering" graduate program in Jewish studies. In 1993, she left McGill to teach at Harvard.

According to one critic, Wisse's work is characterized "by the sharpness of her insight, by her unwillingness to retreat from a skirmish and by the inability of even those who disagree with her to deny her brilliance." She won the 1988 Itzik Manger Prize for Yiddish literature. She received one of the 2007 National Humanities Medals. The award cited her for "scholarship and teaching that have illuminated Jewish literary traditions. Her insightful writings have enriched our understanding of Yiddish literature and Jewish culture in the modern world."

She is a member of the Editorial Board of the Jewish Review of Books and a frequent contributor to Commentary. She dedicated her last book, Jews and Power, to the editor, Neal Kozodoy.

=== Yiddish literature ===
Of The Best Of Sholem Aleichem, a collection of short stories by Sholem Aleichem Wisse edited with Irving Howe, Joyce Carol Oates wrote, "Like all good anthologies... more than simply a heterogeneous collection of pieces linked by common theme or author: it is also a statement, an argument, an attempt at redefinition."

==== Schlemiel ====
The Schlemiel as a Modern Hero, Wisse's first book, a rewriting of her doctoral dissertation "in a vigorously fresh and witty style", is about the schlemiel as both a type and a literary genre with its origins in the Yiddish literature in the period of Jewish emancipation.

=== Jewish history ===
Wisse has published notable books and essays on contemporary Jewish history, including If I Am Not For Myself: The Liberal Betrayal of the Jews (1992) and Jews and Power (2008).

== Political views ==
Wisse's politics have generally been described as neoconservative.

Wisse has advocated traditional marriage and gender roles, criticized Jewish involvement in communism, and discussed Jewish culpability in crimes committed under communist regimes. Her criticism of the women's liberation movement as a form of neo-Marxism has been extensively cited by critics of radical feminist politics. She wrote:

Women's liberation, if not the most extreme then certainly the most influential neo-Marxist movement in America, has done to the American home what communism did to the Russian economy, and most of the ruin is irreversible. By defining relations between men and women in terms of power and competition instead of reciprocity and cooperation, the movement tore apart the most basic and fragile contract in human society, the unit from which all other social institutions draw their strength.

Wisse is a Zionist. In May 2014, a profile of Wisse in The Forward called her "one of the most forceful conservative voices in support of Israel, arguing that criticism of the state repeats ingrained habits of Jewish accommodationism and self-blame." She has described the Arab-Israeli conflict as an "Arab war against Israel" rather than a bilateral conflict.

Wisse has been criticized for writing that Palestinians are "people who breed and bleed and advertise their misery". In 1988, Alexander Cockburn wrote about Wisse's frustration with the discomfort American Jewish intellectuals felt regarding violence against Palestinians.

In September 2010, in the midst of Harvard University's decision to cancel a speech by Marty Peretz after he wrote "Muslim life is cheap, especially to other Muslims", Wisse condemned "Groupthink" at Harvard and defended Peretz, saying, "to wish that Muslims would condemn the violence in their midst is not bigotry but liberality". Wisse is a member of the International Advisory Board of NGO Monitor.

In a November 2016 interview, Wisse said she voted for Donald Trump in the 2016 United States presidential election despite his being "16th on [her preferred] list of Republican candidates for president". She endorsed Trump for reelection in 2020 in a Wall Street Journal op-ed.

== Books ==
- Free As A Jew, A Personal Memoir of National Self-Liberation (2021). Post Hill Press.
- The Schlemiel as a Modern Hero. University of Chicago Press. 1971. ISBN 0226903117.
- A Little Love in Big Manhattan (1988)
- If I Am Not For Myself: The Liberal Betrayal of the Jews (1992)
- The Modern Jewish Canon: A Journey Through Language and Culture. Free Press. 2000. ISBN 978-0684830759.
- Jews and Power. Nextbook. 2007. ISBN 978-0805242249.
- No Joke: Making Jewish Humor. Princeton University Press. 2013. ISBN 978-0691149462.

=== Books edited ===
- A Shtetl and Other Yiddish Novellas. Behrman House. 1973. ISBN 0874412013.
- The Best of Sholem Aleichem, Introduction by Irving Howe and Wisse (1979)
- The Penguin Book of Modern Yiddish Verse, co-edited by Irving Howe (1988)
- The I.L. Peretz Reader (1996)

=== Translations ===
- The I.L. Peretz Reader, by I. L. Peretz (1996)
- The Well, by Chaim Grade; original title: Der brunem
- "My Quarrel with Hersh Rasseyner", by Chaim Grade; original title: "Mayn Krig mit Hersh Rasseyner"

=== Festschrift ===
- Arguing the Modern Jewish Canon: Essays on Literature and Culture in Honor of Ruth R. Wisse, ed. Justin Cammy et al., Center for Jewish Studies, Harvard University: distributed by Harvard University Press, 2008.

== Awards ==
- 2000: National Jewish Book Award in Scholarship for The Modern Jewish Canon: A Journey through Language and Culture
- 52nd Jefferson Lecture
