= Lev Britanishsky =

Lev Romanovich Britanishsky (Russian: Лев Романович Британишский; 1897–1971) was a Soviet Russian painter and graphic artist.

He was born in Kronstadt. His father Ruvel Britanishsky was a fashionable goldsmith in Kronstadt, and his ancestors were craftsmen originally from Vilna Governorate. His wife Francis Osinsky came from a family of Polish noblemen also from Vilna.

Following his studies at the gymnasium, he entered the Art School of Baron Alexander Stieglitz. He also studied under Pavel Chistyakov for several years. He entered the Academy of Arts in 1918, where he was taught by Kuzma Petrov-Vodkin. He graduated from the Academy in 1923. He also took porcelain painting lessons from Sergey Chekhonin in the 1920s. From 1926, he was a member of the Circle of Artists group, and participated in exhibitions of the Circle. He joined the Union of Artists in 1932.

During World War II, he participated in the rescue of treasures from the Hermitage Museum (1941), before being evacuated to Sverdlovsk in March 1942, where he taught at the Ural State University (1943–1944). He returned to Leningrad after the war. He was named as an Honored Artist of the Russian SFSR in 1967.

He died in 1971. He was the father of the poet Vladimir Britanishsky.
