= Julia Gamolina =

American architect

- Occupations: Architect, Associate Principal at Ennead Architects, Founder and Editor-in-Chief of Madame Architect, Visiting Assistant Professor at the Pratt Institute
- Notable work: Madame Architect

Julia Gamolina is a New York City based architect, writer, and educator, known for her contributions to promoting the visibility and advancement of women in architecture and design. She is the Founder and Editor-in-Chief of Madame Architect, a digital magazine and media start-up that celebrates women practitioners in the field. She holds the position of Associate Principal and Business Development Director at Ennead Architects, where she focuses on projects in the educational, cultural, and healthcare sectors. She is also a Visiting Assistant Professor at the Pratt Institute, teaching a graduate level Professional Practice Seminar on the history and practices of the profession.

== Early life and education ==
Gamolina was born in Russia and immigrated to Toronto, Canada with her family at age 8. She received her Bachelor of Architecture at Cornell University, graduating in 2013 with the Charles Goodwin Sands Memorial Medal for exceptional merit in the thesis of architecture.

== Work ==
Gemolina worked in business development at FXCollaborative, and design roles at Rockwell Group, Studio V Architecture, and Gabellini Sheppard. She also worked as the director of strategy of the Trahan Architects, a studio named the #1 Design firm in the U.S. for 2019, by ARCHITECT 50.

As of 2023 Julia holds the position of Associate Principal and Business Development Director at Ennead Architects, her projects focus on the educational, cultural, and healthcare sectors.

Julia is a Visiting Assistant Professor at the Pratt Institute, teaching a graduate level Professional Practice Seminar on the history and the practices of the profession.

Her notable speaking engagements include lectures at Harvard University, Columbia University, Yale University, University of Pennsylvania, Pratt, the IE School of Architecture and Design, and Georgia Tech, as well as NeueHouse, AIANY/The Center for Architecture, the Architecture & Design Film Festival in New York City, and the Women, Architecture and Sustainability Congress in Bogota, Colombia. She has served on juries for the 2019 World Architecture Festival and the DNA Paris Design Awards, as well as a media critic for the AIA Dallas Built Design Awards. She has served as a guest critic for design reviews at Cornell AAP, Columbia GSAPP, and the School of Visual Arts (SVA), and was the opening keynote speaker at AIA ‘22 in Chicago, interviewing AIA’s new CEO, Lakisha Woods.

=== Publications ===
In May 2018 Julia founded an online magazine, Madame Architect, which as of 2023 has told the stories of over 400 architects, designers, CEOs, publicists, journalists, business strategists, and counsel, through articles and interviews. As of 2023 Julia remains the editor and chief of Madame Architect. Julia’s writing has also been featured in Fast Company, A Women’s Thing, Metropolis Magazine, Architizer, and the Architect's Newspaper.

== Awards and honors ==
=== 2023 ===
- Wallpaper USA 300, "The Wallpaper USA 300 is a window to creative America: we shine the spotlight on 300 talents that are forging new paths through America’s design landscape." Wallpaper.

=== 2021 ===
- Design Changemakers, "The Apartment Therapy Design Changemakers Class of 2021 is made up of 24 of the most talented and dynamic people in the design world.", Apartment Therapy.
- Commercial Observer's Class of 2021 Top Young Professionals, yearly award given to young professionals who have shown outstanding commitment to their industries, which include design & construction, finance, and leasing & sales brokerage. Issued by Commercial Observer.

=== 2019 ===
- Professional Women in Construction's "20 Under 40", Issued by Professional Women in Construction, New York.
- AIANY Special Citation 2019, Special Citations are bestowed at the discretion of the Honors Committee in recognition of achievements in architecture, education, and related fields, Issued by Commercial Observer.

== Publications ==
- "A 3-Point Manifesto for Advancing Women in Architecture", Architizer
- 2021: "The Unspoken Burden on Women in Architecture", Metropolis
- 2019: "A Story No Longer Untold: Astra Zarina’s Influence on Modern Architecture", Metropolis
- 2019: "Women to Women: Conversations Across Boys’ Club", A Women's Thing
- 2018: "Stop asking where all the female architects are; we're right here", The Architect's Newspaper
