= Alexander Semyonovich Vedernikov =

Russian artist (1898–1975)

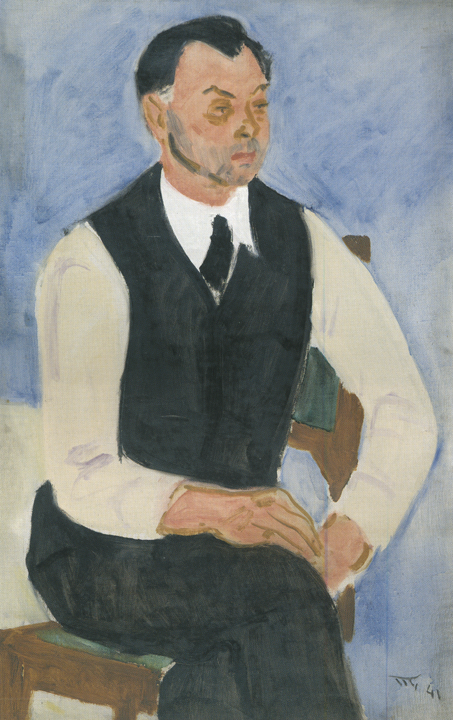
Portrait of artist A. S. Vedernikov, 1941, by Vladimir Grinberg

Alexander Semyonovich Vedernikov (Russian: Александр Семёнович Ведерников; 23 November 1898 - 21 January 1975) was a Russian artist. He was born in the city of Gorodets in Nizhny Novgorod Governorate. He studied at the Nizhny Novgorod art workshops (1921–24) with Alexander V. Kuprin and Artur Fonvizin, and at the Leningrad Vkhutemas-Vhutein (1924–28) with Osip Braz and Alexei Karev.

He was a member of the Society "Circle of Artists" (Круг художников) (1928-30) and from 1939 he worked at the Leningrad Experimental Lithographic Workshop.

Identified with the Leningrad landscape school, his work was exhibited in numerous shows of Leningrad artists in the postwar decades. His paintings are preserved in the Russian Museum, St. Petersburg; Tretyakov Gallery, Moscow; Pushkin Museum of Fine Arts, Moscow.

He died in Leningrad in 1975.
