= Valentin Yakovlevich Brodsky =

Soviet artist and art critic

Valentin Yakovlevich Brodsky (Russian: Валентин Яковлевич Бродский; 1905–1981) was a Soviet artist and art critic. He was born in Kharkiv in 1905, in the family of a medical doctor. He studied under the artists A. D. Silin, P. A. Shillingovsky and Mstislav Dobuzhinsky.

He served in the army during the Second World War, heading up the Baltic Fleet translation bureau. He lived through the siege of Leningrad, which served as the basis of a series of drawings during the 1940s. He finished the war with the rank of major. After the war, he taught at Leningrad State University.

He died in 1981. His son, Vadim V. Brodsky, is also an artist.
