= RiverSpring Living =

American health care organization

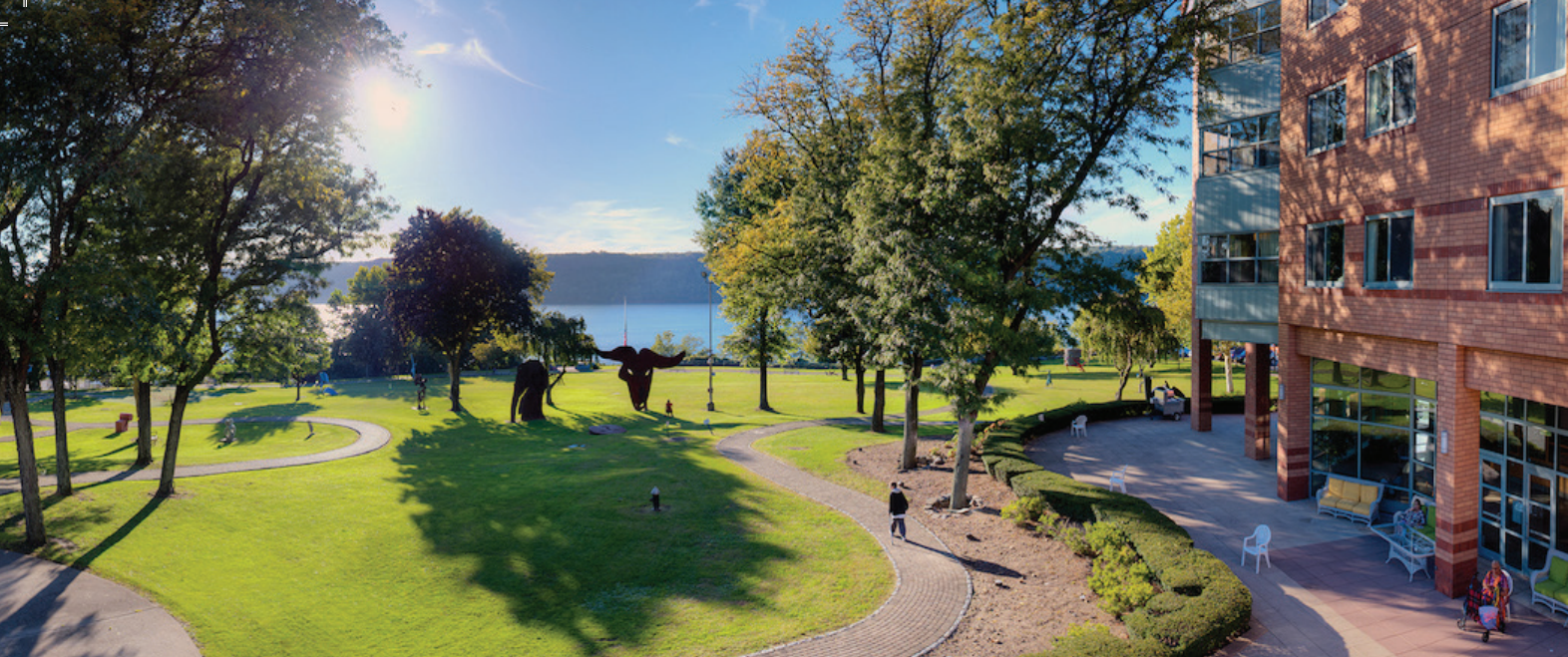
RiverSpring Living (campus view)

RiverSpring Living is an American health care organization for older adults based in New York City. It was founded in 1917 in Harlem as The Hebrew Home and was renamed RiverSpring Living in 2021.

== History ==
RiverSpring Living was founded in 1917 as the Hebrew Home, a Jewish organization based in a synagogue focused on helping homeless older adults. In 1951, it acquired a 19-acre Riverdale site, which was the former Riverdale Children's Association and before that the Colored Orphan Asylum. The new location accommodated 150 residents, and a staff of forty doctors, nurses, and other personnel. In April 1951, it was renamed the Hebrew Home for the Aged at Riverdale.

In 1958, Reverend Isaac Spira, who served as the Hebrew Home's leader for 30 years, retired. He and his wife became residents, and Jacob Reingold became Executive Vice President. In 1961, Jacob Reingold founded "Grandparents Day," the first Sunday after Labor Day, to honor and appreciate all grandparents. It was later declared a national holiday by President Jimmy Carter.

In 1982, the Derfner Judaica Museum was founded at the Hebrew Home, with hundreds of Jewish ceremonial objects donated by Ralph and Leuba Baum. The organization established the Hebrew Home's Research Division, which included the National Alzheimer Center, partnering with medical institutions like Mount Sinai Hospital and Columbia-Presbyterian Medical Center to research on aging.

In 1990, Jacob Reingold retired. His successor was his son, Daniel Reingold, M.S., J.D., who serves as president and CEO. In 1995, the organization created the nation's first sexual expression policy in long-term care, which emphasizes the importance of allowing residents to participate in consensual sex and intimacy.

In 1996, the Hebrew Home launched ElderServe (now RiverSpring Health Plans), which provides managed long-term care plans to seniors from the Bronx, Manhattan, and Westchester.

In 2005, the Harry and Jeanette Weinberg Center for Elder Abuse Prevention, now named the Harry and Jeanette Weinberg Center for Elder Justice, was formed at the Hebrew Home to inform community members on how to identify and prevent financial, psychological, and physical abuse among the elderly. It became the nation's first comprehensive regional elder abuse shelter in a long-term care facility.

In 2012, the Hebrew Home acquired the 14 acres adjacent to its Riverdale property to create the 32-acre Maurice R. and Corinne P. Greenberg Campus on the Hudson River. Due to the growth and expansion of housing, home care, and community services, the Hebrew Home at Riverdale was rebranded to RiverSpring Living.

In 2014, RiverSpring Living partnered with SAGE (Services and Advocacy for GLBT Elders) to provide an LGBTQ-focused social adult day program at the Hebrew Home. The same year, RiverSpring and NewYork-Presbyterian partnered to create a rehabilitation unit. RiverSpring Rehabilitation specializes in short-term inpatient rehabilitation for major health conditions. In 2017, RiverSpring adopted the use of medical marijuana, while still complying with federal law.

In 2024, David V. Pomeranz, long time Chief Operating Officer, was named President and CEO of RiverSpring Living.

== Operations ==
RiverSpring Living provides various eldercare services, including assisted living, memory care, independent living, skilled nursing care, rehabilitation, and programs for elder abuse prevention. Accommodation options range from independent living apartments for those over 65 to assisted living and memory care units. The Hebrew Home at Riverdale provides long-term skilled nursing care and memory care. RiverSpring Home Care offers in-home support for individuals recently discharged from hospitals or rehabilitation facilities and those needing longer-term care.
