= Palladia (social services organization) =

Social services charity in New York City

Palladia, Inc. is a social services organization in New York City, working with individuals and families challenged by addiction, homelessness, AIDS, domestic violence, poverty and trauma. Founded in 1970, Palladia was known as Project Return Foundation until 2002. The organization began as a drug treatment facility and evolved to address the concerns of its clients, developing services such as domestic violence shelters, outpatient drug treatment programs, parenting programs, AIDS outreach, alternatives to incarceration, and transitional and permanent housing.

Palladia has long focused on the particular needs of women in treatment, staging conferences, pioneering ways to bring services to hard-to-reach clients and developing programs that highlighted the connection between trauma and addiction. Palladia also developed several specialized programs that fostered connections between parents undergoing treatment and their children.
