= Minei Ilyich Kuks =

Soviet artist

Minei Ilyich Kuks (Миней Ильич Кукс, born 1902 - died 1979) was a Soviet graphic artist. He studied art in Irkutsk and Moscow and was a noted illustrator of children's books, e.g. the 1972 edition of A Summer's Evening by Vasily Zhukovsky. During the Second World War, he was part of the Battle Pencil artists' group and created the propaganda poster "How two partisan detachments beat the fascist reptile" (Как два партизанских отряда били фашистского гада) (1941) in collaboration with Yu. N. Petrov and V. A. Tambi.

Kuks was a member of the Leningrad Experimental Graphics Laboratory. He was married to another LEGL artist Aleksandra Iakobson.
