= Martha Thorne =

American architect

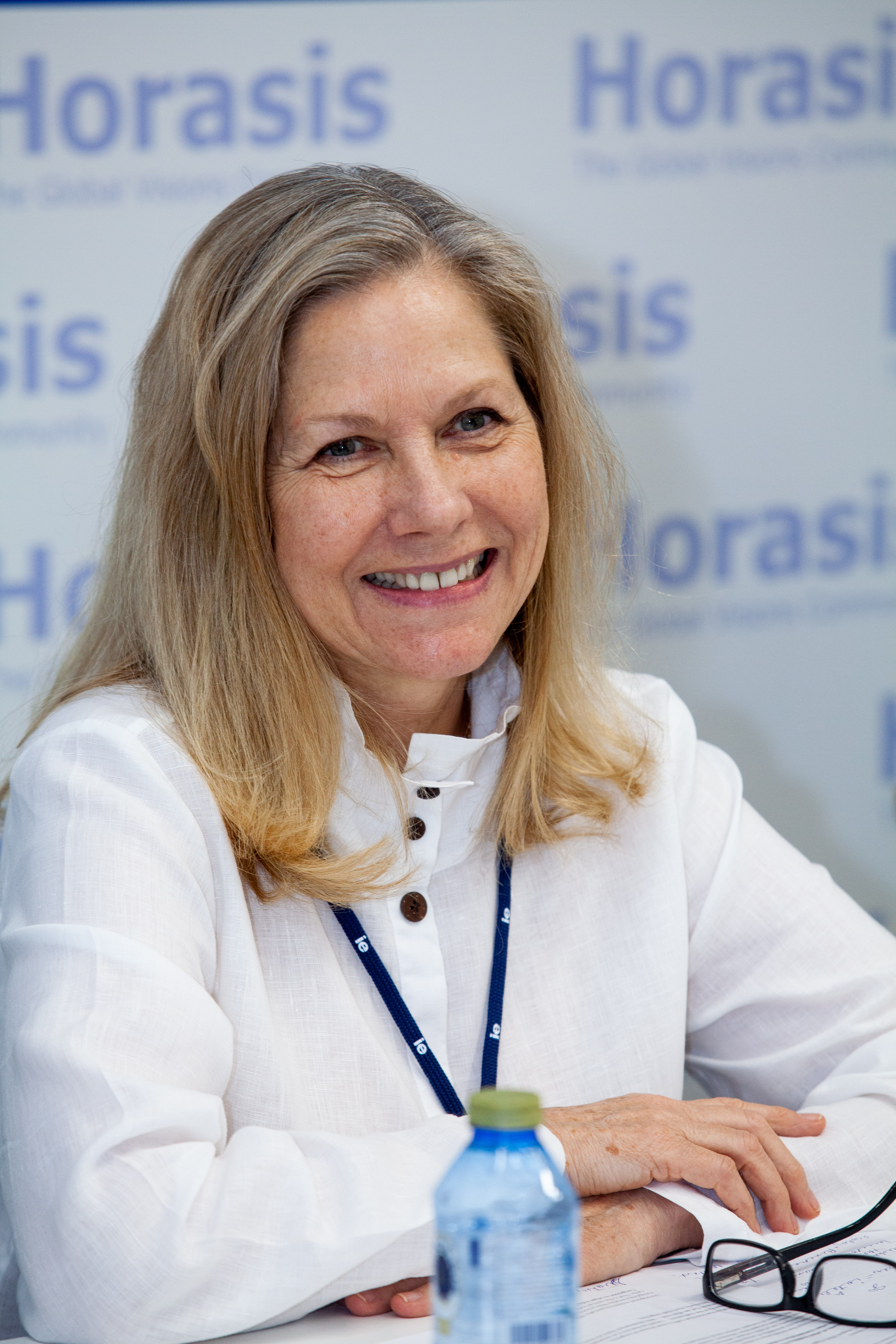
- Thorne in 2019
- Born: March 6, 1953 (age 73)
- Education: State University of New York at Buffalo; University of Pennsylvania
- Occupation: Architect
- Practice: Pritzker Architecture Prize; The Art Institute of Chicago

Martha Thorne (born 1953) is an American architectural academic, curator, editor, and author. She served as the Executive Director of the Pritzker Architecture Prize for 15 years, and was also the dean of the Architecture School at IE University in Madrid.

== Biography ==
Thorne holds degrees from State University of New York at Buffalo (Bachelor of Arts, Urban Affairs) and University of Pennsylvania (Master's degree in City Planning). She also pursued further studies at the London School of Economics.

From 1996 until 2005, she was Associate Curator for the Department of Architecture at The Art Institute of Chicago, where she was responsible for publication development, research initiatives, and collection curation.

In 2005, she was appointed Executive Director of the Pritzker Architecture Prize, a role she held until 2020.

From 2015 to 2021, she served as dean of IE University's Madrid and Segovia School of Architecture and Design. Before that, she was Associate Dean for External Relations at the same institution.

Thorne has also been a member of the Board of Trustees of the Graham Foundation for Advanced Studies in the Fine Arts and has served on the Board of Advisors for the International Archive of Women in Architecture.

When there is globalization in any field there's the danger that every place becomes similar, or in this case the danger that schools can become similar or standardized, all trying to approach architecture and the academics of architecture in the same way ... I think what's really interesting is to try to look at schools and see how they try to differentiate themselves.

— Martha Thorne

== Style and work ==
Her main inspiration themes are the contemporary city and how architecture, design, and urbanism can contribute to sustainability and resilience; and how architecture and design education can evolve in both content and pedagogy to be more relevant for today’s challenges. From 1995 to 2005, she worked as curator in Department of Architecture at The Art Institute of Chicago. She has written numerous articles for books and journals on contemporary architecture and the city.

== Selected works ==
- 1992, Visiones para Madrid: cinco ideas arquitectónicas, Zaha Hadid, Mikko Heikkinen & Markku Komonen, Hans Hollein, Alvaro Siza, Stanley Tigerman: [exposition], Centro Cultural Conde Duque, 16 noviembre-10 enero 1993
- 1994, Museos y arquitectura : nuevas perspectivas [Exposición del 10.05 al 12.06.1994 en la sala de exposiciones del Círculo de Bellas Artes, Madrid / comisaria Martha Thorne]
- 1999, The Pritzker Architecture Prize : the first twenty years (with Colin Amery; et al.)
- 2000, Rafael Moneo, Audrey Jones Beck Building, the Museum of Fine Arts, Houston (with Joe C Aker; Gary Zvonkovic; José Rafael Moneo)
- 2001, Modern trains and splendid stations: Architecture, design and rail travel for the twenty-first century
- 2002, David Adler, architect : the elements of style (with Richard Guy Wilson; Pauline C Metcalf)
- 2004, Unbuilt Chicago (with Art Institute of Chicago)
- 2006, Informe sobre el fomento de la arquitectura. Anexo (with Fundación Arquitectura Contemporánea)
