= Neal Kozodoy =

American writer, journalist and editor

Neal Kozodoy is an American writer, journalist and editor.

Kozodoy joined the staff of Commentary in 1966 and served as editor from 1995 to 2009. He continues as editor-at-large.

According to Peter Wehner writing in the National Review, Kozodoy "has been a key, if largely unheralded, figure in shaping the intellectual and moral debates of our time."

He is the editor of Mosaic Magazine.
