= Estorick Collection of Modern Italian Art =

Museum in London

Coordinates: 51°32′38″N 0°6′0″W

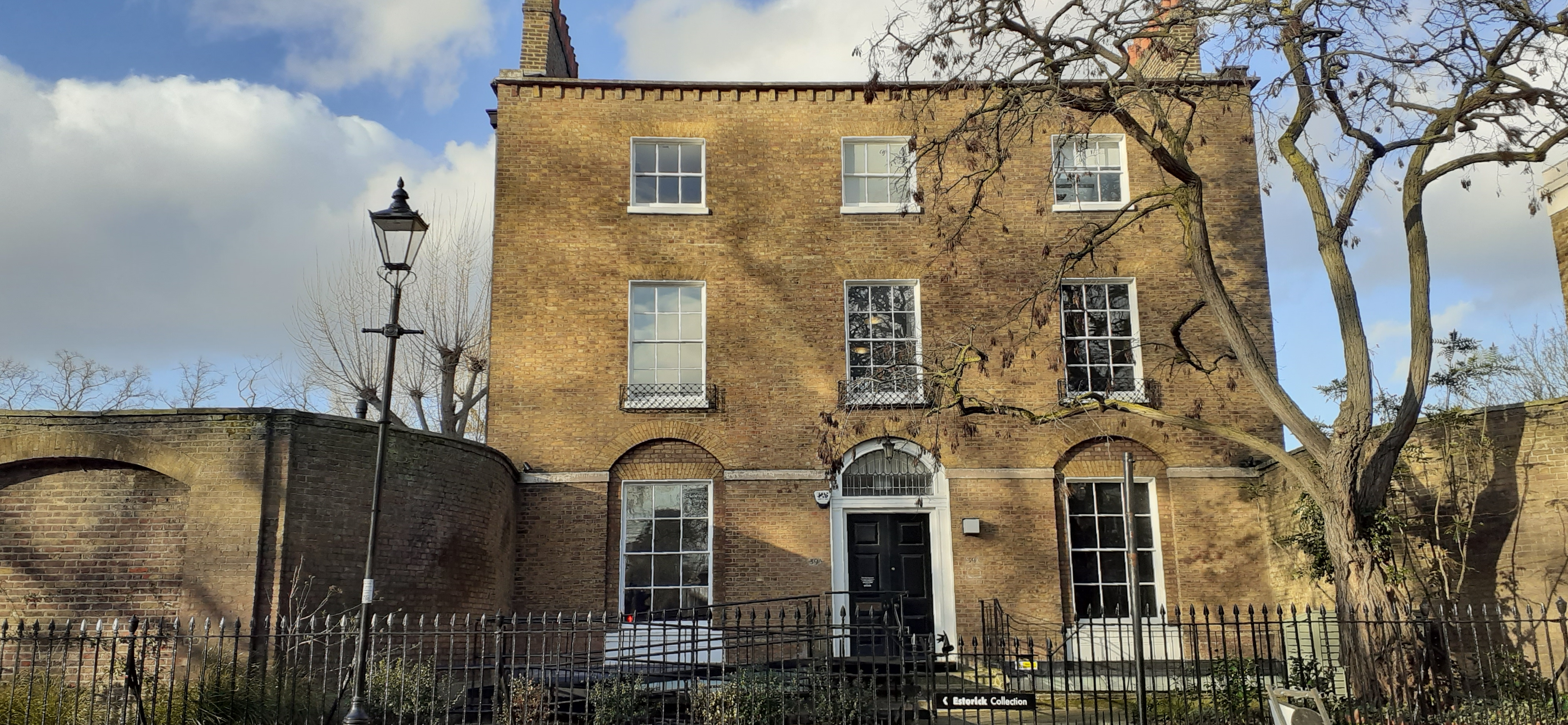
- Location: 39A Canonbury Square, Islington, London N1

The Estorick Collection of Modern Italian Art is a museum in Canonbury Square in the district of Islington, London in the United Kingdom. It is the country's only gallery devoted to modern Italian art and is a registered charity.

Ardengo Soffici, 1912–13, Deconstruction of the Planes of a Lamp, oil on panel, 45 × 35 cm

The Estorick Collection was founded by the American sociologist and writer Eric Estorick (1913–1993), who began to collect art when he moved to England after the Second World War. Estorick and his German-born English wife Salome (1920–1989) discovered Umberto Boccioni's book Futurist Painting and Sculpture (1914) while they were on their honeymoon in 1947. Before the end of their trip they visited the erstwhile Futurist Mario Sironi in Milan and bought most of the contents of his studio, including hundreds of drawings. They built up the collection mainly between 1953 and 1958. The collection was shown in several temporary exhibitions, including one at the Tate Gallery in London in 1956, and the key works were on long-term loan to the Tate from 1966 to 1975. The Estoricks rejected offers to purchase their collection from the Italian government and museums in the United States and Israel. Six months prior to his death Eric Estorick set up the Eric and Salome Estorick Foundation, to which he donated all his Italian works.

The Estorick Collection moved to its current premises in Northampton Lodge, previously the home and office of Sir Basil Spence, the British architect, a converted Grade II-listed Georgian house, in 1998. The project was supported by a grant from the Heritage Lottery Fund.

The core of the collection is its Futurist works, but it also includes figurative art and sculpture dating from 1890 to the 1950s. It features paintings by Futurism's main protagonists: Giacomo Balla, Umberto Boccioni, Carlo Carrà, Gino Severini, Luigi Russolo and Ardengo Soffici, and works by Giorgio de Chirico, Amedeo Modigliani, Giorgio Morandi, Mario Sironi and Marino Marini. In addition to the main displays from the permanent collection, the Estorick Collection organises temporary exhibitions.
