= Rahachow district =

District of Gomel region, Belarus

Coordinates: 53°06′N 30°03′E

Rahachow district Рагачоўскі раён (Belarusian) Рогачёвский район (Russian)
- District
- Flag Coat of arms

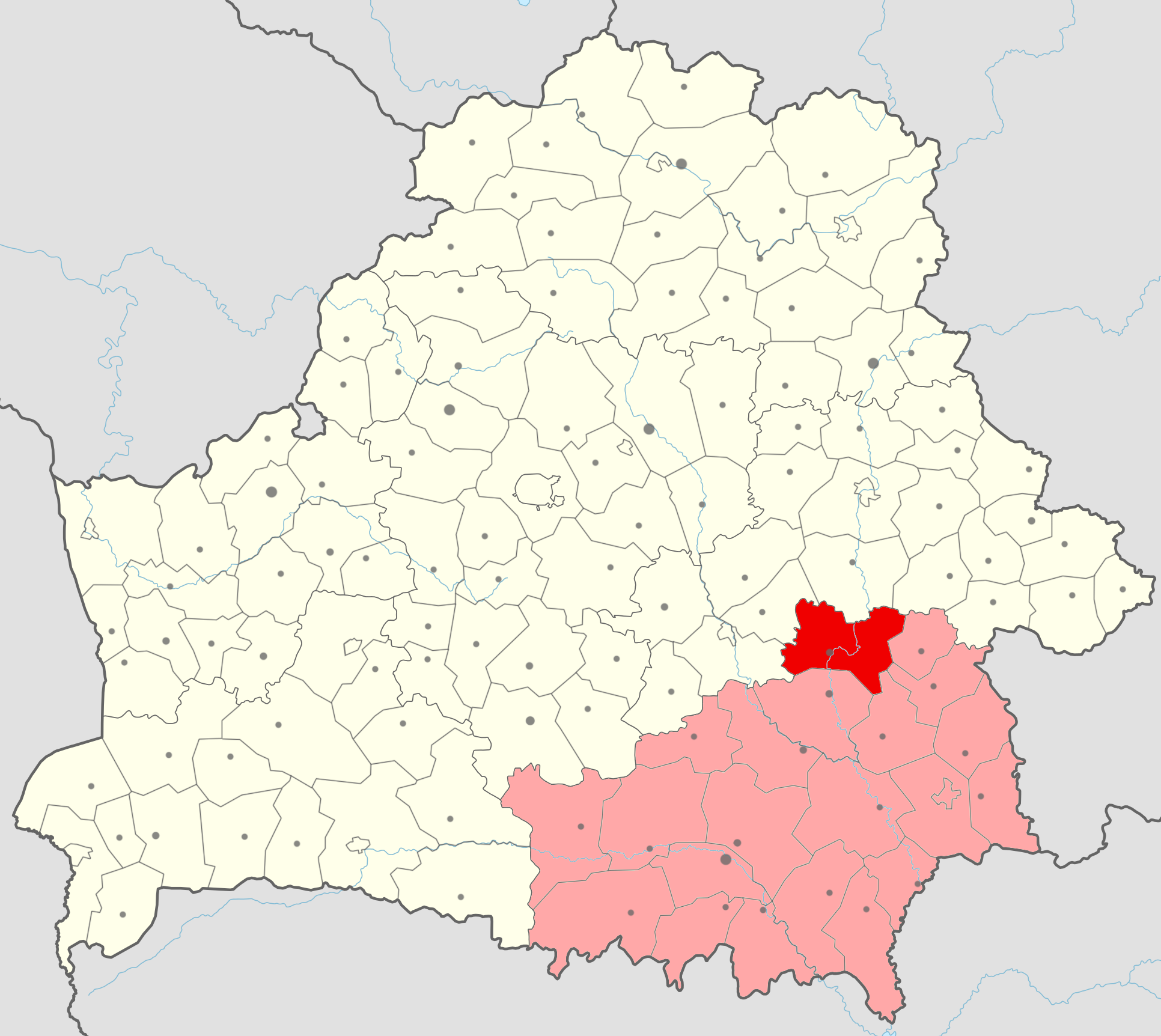
- Country: Belarus
- Region: Gomel region
- Administrative center: Rahachow

Area
  - Total: 2,066.99 km^{2} (798.07 sq mi)

Population (2024)
  - Total: 50,579
  - Density: 24.470/km^{2} (63.377/sq mi)
- Time zone: UTC+3 (MSK)

Rogachev district an administrative-territorial unit of Gomel Oblast. It borders on Bobruisk, Kirovsk, Bykhov, and Slavgorod districts of Mogilev Oblast and on Karmyansk, Chechersk, Buda-Koshelevsky, and Zhlobin districts of Gomel Oblast.

== History (Гісторыя) ==
The first people appeared on the territory of the modern Rogachev district 14 thousand years ago - tribes of the archaeological culture of Lyngby. Several objects of this period and one settlement have been found. In the Mesolithic and Neolithic eras, people already mastered most of the territory of the district: more than 25 settlements of this period have been found, including 5 in the city. During archaeological excavations, the settlements of Zborow and Kistyan were found.

The territory of the district was part of the Chernihiv, Kiev and Turov principalities, and in the 13th century it became part of the Grand Duchy of Lithuania. In the 15th century, the Muscovite troops of Ivan III took Rogachev, but were then forced to leave. During the Polish-Lithuanian Commonwealth, the territory was part of the Rogachev Starostve.

In 1772, as a result of the first partition of the Polish-Lithuanian Commonwealth, the entire left-bank part of the country with Rogachev was ceded to the Russian Empire. Catherine II made Rogachev the center of Rogachev province, and in 1777 — the center of Rogachev district. The district included the present Rogachev, Zhlobin, Chechersky, Karmyansky, Buda-Koshelevsky and half of the Kirov district.

On April 29, 1919, the Gomel Governorate was formed within the RSFSR, which included the Rogachev region.

Rogachev district was formed on July 17, 1924 as part of the Bobruisk district of the BSSR. The center is the city of Rogachev. On August 20, 1924, it was divided into 15 village councils: Azyaransky, Godzilavytsky, Dvaretsky, Zabalatsky, Zapolsky, Zborovsky, Kistyanevsky, Krushynovsky (Veliokrushynovsky), Luchynsky, Madorsky, Pobalovsky, Sverzhansky, Stankovsky, Staroselsky, Tikhinitsky. On August 21, 1925, the Osavitsky (Osavitsky) village council was formed. On August 4, 1927, the Vishansky, Gorodetsk, Kurgansky, Malostralkovsky, Merkulavichy, Prybarsky, Svyatsky (Svyatkovsky), Stauppnyansky village councils of the abolished Gorodetsk district were annexed to the district. After the abolition of the district division on July 26, 1930, the district was directly subordinate to the BSSR. On July 8, 1931, the Dovsky village council of the abolished Zhuravichi district was annexed to the district; on December 5, 1931, the Zvanetsky village council of the Bykhov district. On February 12, 1935, the Dovsky, Zvanetsky, Kurgansky, Malostralkovsky, Sverzhansky village councils were transferred to the newly formed Dovsky district; the Osavnitsky (Osavichy) village council was transferred to the Kirov district. On April 5, 1936, the Malostralkovsky village council of the Zhuravichi district was returned to the district, the Priborsky village council was transferred to the Buda-Koshelevsky district, and the Merkulavichy village council was transferred to the Chechersky district. Since February 20, 1938, the district has been part of the Gomel region. On April 20, 1939, the Svyatsky (Svyatkovsky) village council was renamed Kirovsky. On April 29, 1950, the Kirovsky village council was transferred to the Zhlobin district. On July 16, 1954, the Vishansky, Krushynovsky, and Madorsky village councils were abolished. On December 17, 1956, the Balatnyansky, Dovsky, Zhuravichi, Zvanetsky, Kurgansky, Rektsensky, and Serebryany village councils of the abolished Zhuravichi district were annexed to the district. On June 11, 1957, the Rekta Village Council was transferred to the Slavgorod District of the Mogilev Region.. On January 12, 1960, the settlement of the peat enterprise Belitsk was reorganized into the workers' settlement Belitsk. On April 14, 1960, the Kistenievsky, Malostrolkovsky, Serebransky, Stankovsky village councils were abolished. On December 25, 1962, the urban settlement of Karma, Barsukovsky, Bychansky, Volynetsky, Vornovsky, Korotkovsky, Kurakovshchynsky, Kurganitsky, Litsvinovichsky, Rossokhsky, Starogradsky, Strukachovsky, Strumensky, Khlyavnyansky village councils of the abolished Karmyany district were annexed to the district. On September 19, 1963, the Kistenievsky village council was formed, the Kurakovshchynsky village council was abolished. On January 6, 1965, the urban settlement of Karma, Barsukovsky, Bychansky, Volynetsky, Vornovsky, Korotsky, Kurganitsky, Litsvinavitsky, Rossokhsky, Starogradsky, Strukachovsky, Strumensky, Khlyavnyansky village councils were transferred to the Chechersky district. On March 25, 1965, the Oktyabrovsky village council of the Chechersky district was annexed to the district, which on July 30, 1966 was transferred to the restored Karmyansky district. On February 27, 1978, Rogachev received the status of a city of regional subordination.
