= August Lanin =

Russian painter

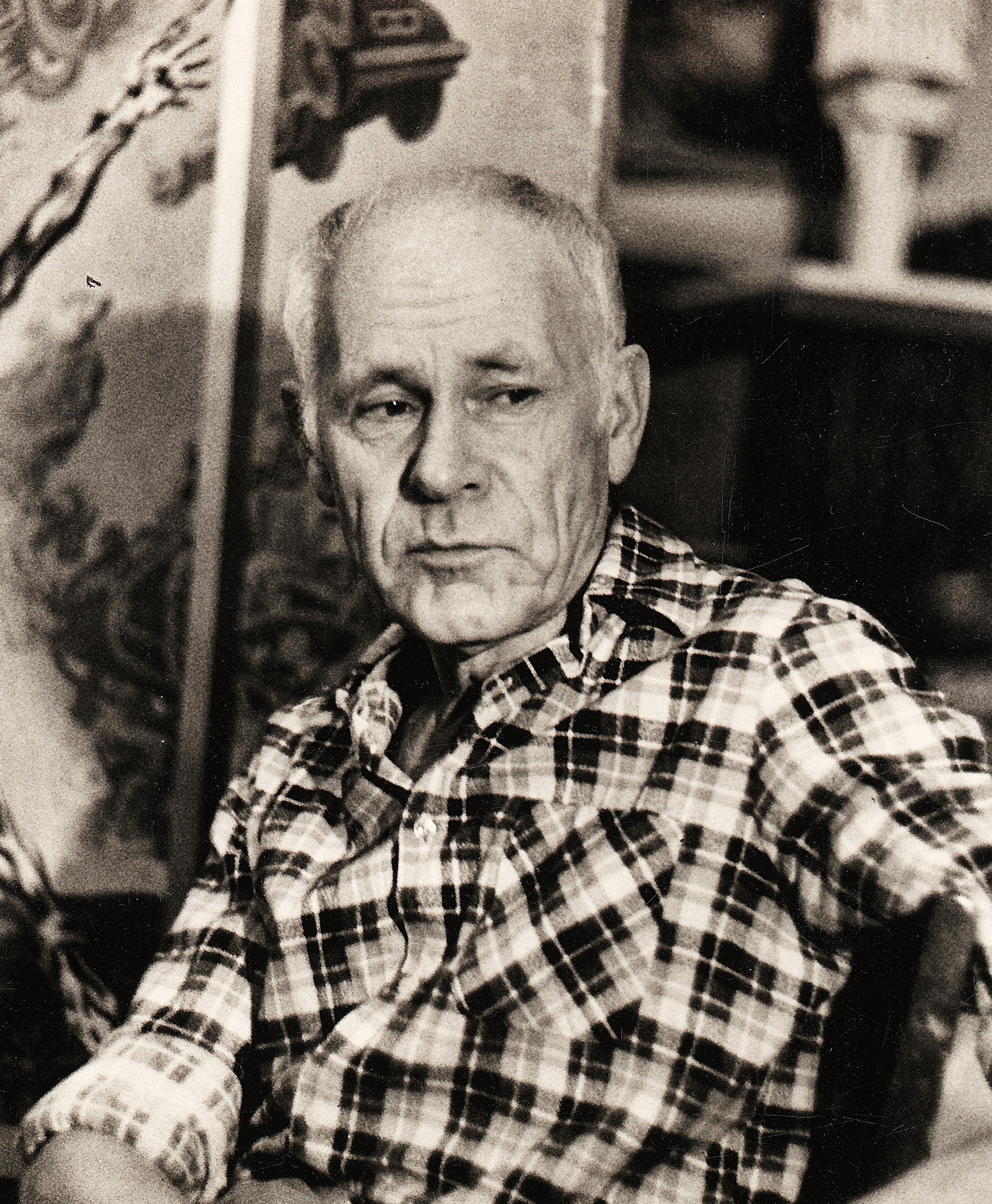
August Lanin

August Vasilievich Lanin (Russian: Август Васильевич Ланин; 1925–2006) was a Russian architect and artist. He was born in the village of Krasnaya Mech in Tula Oblast.

He graduated from the Faculty of Architecture of the Repin Institute of Arts. There were several periods in Lanin's work. In the late 1950s and early 1960s, he was in official favor and participated in many exhibitions at home and abroad. In 1963, his works were declared formalistic, after which he was denied access to exhibitions for many years.

In the 1960s, Lanin experimented with pop art, creating a large number of collages, objects and installations. In 1973–1974, he worked on projects with the Russian space program. In the 1990s, Lanin was mainly engaged in conceptual architecture and worked on the monumental painting cycle "Apocalypse", and in the last years of his life he created frame sculptures from aluminum wire. His works are held in the State Russian Museum, Pushkin House, the Museum of the History of St. Petersburg, and in private collections in Russia and Europe.
