= Eric Estorick =

American art collector, art dealer and author

- Born: Elihu Estorick; 13 February 1913; Brooklyn, New York City, United States
- Died: 25 December 1993 (aged 80); London, England
- Occupations: Art collector; art dealer; author
- Spouse: Salome Dessau

Eric Estorick (13 February 1913 – 25 December 1993) was an American art collector, art dealer and author, who lived in London and ran the Grosvenor Gallery. He and his wife Salome endowed the Estorick Collection of Modern Italian Art in Canonbury, north London.

== Early life and education ==
Eric Estorick was born Elihu Estorick in 1913 in Brooklyn, New York City, the son of Jewish émigrés from Russia.

He studied at New York University where he obtained a PhD in Sociology, and at the New School for Social Research in New York. He later taught at New York University and at Columbia University.

== Personal life ==
In 1947 he married Salome Dessau (1920–1989), the daughter of a German Jewish refugee who became a textile manufacturer in England. Salome had studied art in London, and was involved in some of Eric's art collecting. Salome worked as a textile designer and invented stretch lace. She was employed by the clothing retailer Marks & Spencer, which was a customer of her father's business. Eric Estorick also subsequently worked for Marks & Spencer, and wrote a history of the company.

== Career ==
During the Second World War he joined the United States Government Service, and became head of the British Empire Division of the US Foreign Broadcast Intelligence Service.

In the 1940s he wrote several books on politics, including two biographies of Sir Stafford Cripps.

In 1964 he used his contacts in Czechoslovakia to arrange for the recovery of 1,564 Jewish Torah scrolls that had been confiscated by the Nazi authorities when the Czechoslovak Jews were exterminated. Estorick had the scrolls transferred to Westminster Synagogue in London, and they eventually were distributed to Jewish congregations worldwide.

Shortly before his death in 1993, Eric Estorick set up and endowed the Eric and Salome Estorick Foundation, which founded the Estorick Collection of Modern Italian Art in London. In addition to providing the works that form the core of the collection, Estorick gave paintings by Chagall and Kandinsky to be sold to fund it. London was chosen as the home for the collection in spite of offers to acquire it from the Italian government and from museums in the United States and Israel.

== Art collecting and dealing ==
While a student in New York, Estorick met the American photographer and gallery owner Alfred Stieglitz. Estorick later said:

Meeting Stieglitz was one of the most important experiences of my life, bringing me to the heart of the world of art.

During their honeymoon in Switzerland in 1947, Eric and Salome Estorick met Arturo Bryks, a former teacher at the Bauhaus, who introduced them to Umberto Boccioni's book on Italian Futurism. Before returning from their honeymoon they visited Mario Sironi in Milan from whom they bought a large quantity of his work. Estorick wrote:

I just bought hundreds of drawings, and as many pictures as I could get into my Packard convertible roadster.

In the aftermath of World War II, twentieth-century European art could be bought very cheaply and Estorick bought works by many artists including Picasso, Braque, Gris and Léger. The price of modern Italian paintings was particularly low because of the taint of Fascism; Estorick bought heavily and became friends with several artists.

Estorick started art dealing in the early 1950s, initially by buying work by well-known European artists and selling it in Hollywood. Anne Douglas (Kirk Douglas's wife) became his business partner and his customers included Tony Curtis and Burt Lancaster. In 1960 Estorick opened the new Grosvenor Gallery in London (unrelated to the Grosvenor Gallery of the 1880s), which became the centre of his business as an art dealer.

Estorick lent work for temporary exhibitions at several public galleries, including all the works for an exhibition of Italian art the Tate Gallery in 1956. In 1963, Estorick lent several paintings for the filming of Carl Foreman's The Victors. The Vlaminck and Braque paintings seen in the film are the real thing. Eric Estorick is credited in the film as art consultant.

Before the fall of Communism Estorick made several visits to the Soviet Union to buy artwork, negotiating export permits from the Soviet Ministry of Culture.

In 1967, Estorick met Erté in Paris. Estorick became his exclusive world agent, creating business worth $100 million annually.

== Publications ==
- Stafford Cripps: Prophetic Rebel. New York: John Day Company. 1940. LCCN 41022004.
- The British Social Credit Party (Extracts from an article appearing in Dynamic America). London: Social Credit Party of Great Britain. 1940.
- Stafford Cripps: a biography. London: Heinemann. 1949. OCLC 400539.
- Stafford Cripps: Master Statesman. New York: John Day Company. 1949. (The two Stafford Cripps books published in 1949 in London and New York may be different editions of the same work)
- Changing Empire: Churchill to Nehru. New York: Duell, Sloan and Pearce. 1950. OCLC 561038724.
- Erté: The Last Works. New York: Dutton Studio Books. 1992. ISBN 978-0525934394.

Estorick also wrote A History of Marks and Spencer (c. 1953), which was printed privately, and an unpublished novel in collaboration with Dora Russell (the wife of Bertrand Russell).
