= Derfner Judaica Museum =

Museum in New York City

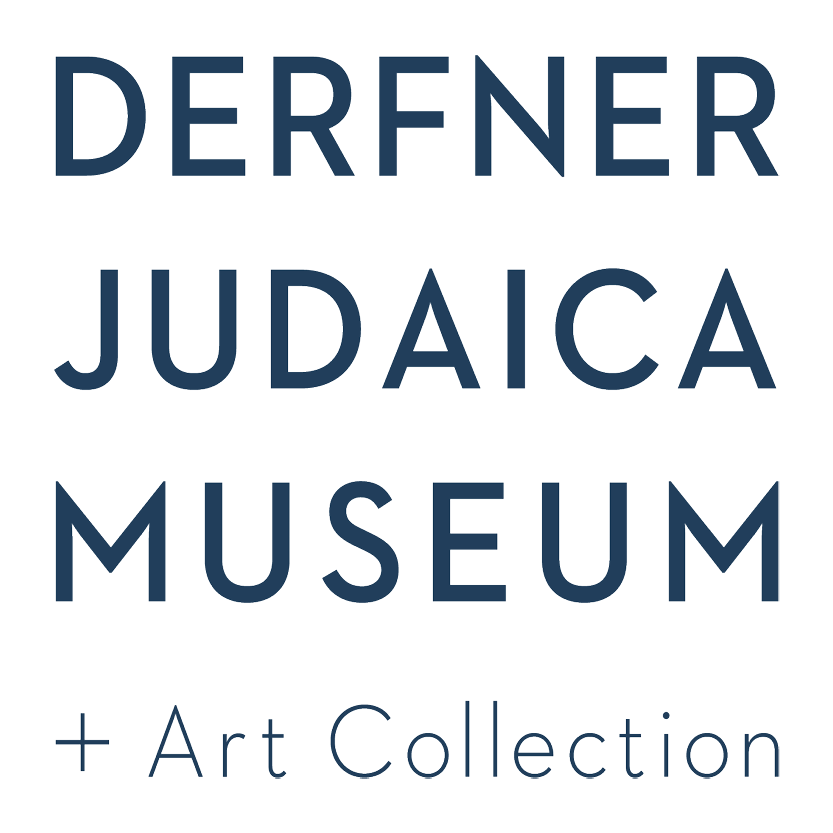
- Logo of the Derfner Judaica Museum 2025

- Location within New York City
- Established: 1982
- Coordinates: 40.909192°N 73.909675°W
- Public transit access: Metro-North Railroad: Hudson Line at Riverdale; New York City Subway: train at Van Cortlandt Park–242nd Street; New York City Bus: Bx9; Bee-Line Bus System: BL1, BL2, BL3
- Website: www.derfner.org

The Derfner Judaica Museum is a cultural and educational center that provides exhibitions relating to Jewish history and contemporary Jewish culture. The museum is located in the Jacob Reingold Pavilion on the grounds of The Hebrew Home at Riverdale in the Riverdale neighborhood of the Bronx in New York City.

== History ==
The Judaica Museum was founded in 1982 when Riverdale residents Ralph and Leuba Baum donated their collection of Jewish ceremonial art to the Home. A refugee from Nazi persecution, Ralph Baum (1907–1984) and his wife, Leuba (d. 1997), had an intense desire to preserve and pass on to future generations the memory embodied in the objects they collected, the majority of which were used primarily by European Jews before the Holocaust. In 2008 the Judaica Museum was named in honor of benefactors Helen and Harold Derfner.

The Derfner Judaica Museum was established in 1982 and relocated to a new space with a capital grant funded by the New York City Department of Cultural Affairs on June 11, 2009 to favorable reviews. The Museum, designed by architect Louise Braverman, occupies a newly expanded 5,000-square-foot (460 m^{2}) exhibition space in the Jacob Reingold Pavilion at The Hebrew Home at Riverdale. It is the focal point for a wide range of educational and exhibition programming for Hebrew Home residents and the public. An adjacent exhibition space is provided in the Elma and Milton A. Gilbert Pavilion Gallery. Completion of the museum was funded in part by a furnishings grant received from the New York City Department of Cultural Affairs.

== Exhibitions ==
The inaugural exhibition, Tradition and Remembrance: Treasures of the Derfner Judaica Museum, explores the intersections of Jewish history and memory. The stories of objects used in traditional Jewish practice are interpreted in light of the role of memory in shaping both individual and communal identities. Among the featured objects in the exhibition are a silver filigree vase, ca. 1911, and an early copper alloy Hanukkah lamp, from the famed Bezalel Academy of Art and Design founded in Jerusalem in 1906. The Bezalel school artists blended "varied strands of surroundings, tradition and innovation," in paintings and craft objects that invokes "biblical themes, Islamic design and European traditions," in their effort to "carve out a distinctive style of Jewish" art for the new nation they intended to build in the ancient Jewish homeland.

Other objects relating to Jewish practice come from near and far, including a set of 18th-century German Torah implements from Meerholz Germany and a velvet fish-scale embroidered matzah cover from turn-of-the-century Jerusalem.

Rotating exhibits are based on its 1,000 object collection; it has also presented exhibits of Jewish art and artifacts from other private collections, museums and art schools. One of the more unusual exhibitions at the museum was a show entitled "Culture as Commodity" that offered a variety of Judaica-related items, including Israeli Coca-Cola T-shirts, that were purchased from eBay and other Internet auction sites.

Also included under the umbrella of the Home is The Art Collection at The Hebrew Home at Riverdale which comprises over 4,500 paintings, prints, photographs, and sculpture ranging from contemporary works by such artists as Alex Katz, Ben Shahn, and Andy Warhol to Native American ceremonial art and African sculpture. Rotating exhibitions feature the work of both established and emerging artists. The grounds are home to one of New York City’s few outdoor sculpture gardens. Rotating exhibitions featuring contemporary art are changed every 6–8 weeks.
