= Anatoli Lvovich Kaplan =

Belarusian Jewish painter, sculptor, and printmaker

- Анатолий Львович Каплан
- The Musicians (1968) by Kaplan
- Born: December 26 or 28, 1902; Rogachov, Mogilev Governorate, Russian Empire (now Rahachow, Belarus)
- Died: 1980 (aged 77–78); Leningrad, Soviet Union
- Education: Imperial Academy of Arts
- Occupations: Painter, sculptor, printmaker

Anatoli Lvovich Kaplan (Russian: Анатолий Львович Каплан, Yiddish: תנחום קאפלאן), (1902 – 1980) was a Soviet-era Russian painter, sculptor and printmaker, whose works often reflect his Jewish origins.

== Life ==
Kaplan was born in Rogachov, Mogilev Governorate, Russian Empire (now Rahachow, Belarus) on December 26 or 28 1902. He was one of six children; his father was a butcher in Rahachow which was at that time within the Jewish Pale of Settlement in Russia. His background was therefore not dissimilar to that of Marc Chagall, born a generation earlier in 1887, and although their lives were very different, their art has much in common. The shtetl (Jewish village) figures in many of Kaplan's paintings; autobiographical references are very clear in The Butcher's Shop (1972) and Tailor's Shops (1975) and in the many illustrations which he was to create to the works of Sholem Aleichem.

Around 1922 Kaplan came to Leningrad (then named Petrograd), where he was to base his career for the rest of his life, although he often revisited the towns of his childhood. He graduated in 1927 from the Russian Academy of Arts there.

In the 1930s he became associated with a group of artists and lithographers in Leningrad which had been instructed to prepare a series of works dedicated to the remote Jewish Autonomous Oblast, being created by Joseph Stalin in the hope of resettling Russia's Jewish population in a remote area in the Far East of the country. Here Kaplan learnt and took to the skills of printmaking, developing many individual techniques. His first cycle of prints (1937–1940) was entitled Kasrilevka, (the name of the village invented by Sholem Aleichem).

During the war Kaplan was at first evacuated to the Urals, but returned to Leningrad in 1944. His lithograph cycle of Landscapes of Leningrad during the Days of the Blockade (1948) was widely acclaimed in Russia and was purchased by eighteen State galleries.

At one time Kaplan was supervisor of design in a glassware factory and this gave him an interest in the third dimension which was later to blossom in his ceramics and sculptures.

From the 1950s onwards Kaplan's artworks concentrated on Jewish themes, despite constant and often serious opposition and obstruction from the Soviet cultural authorities. Amongst these works are his cover and illustrations to the Jewish Folksongs of Dmitri Shostakovich (1977), illustrations to Aleichem's Tevye the Milkman (3 series, 1957–1966), The Enchanted Tailor (1954–57) and Song of Songs (1962), and an extensive series of coloured lithographs (commissioned by the Grosvenor Gallery in London in 1961) on the old Jewish Passover song Chad Gadya (One Kid Goat). Throughout this time Kaplan was also producing paintings, though because of their subject matter they were rarely displayed in the Russia of his time. From 1967 onward he began also to produce ceramics and sculptures, including a set based on the characters of Gogol's Dead Souls.

Kaplan died in Leningrad, aged 77.

== Exhibitions ==
A substantial retrospective exhibition of Kaplan's work was held at the Russian Museum, St. Petersburg, in 1995. Other major exhibitions have been held in New York City (1992), London, Amsterdam, Jerusalem and elsewhere.
