= Rahachow =

Rahachow Рагачоў (Belarusian) Рогачёв (Russian) Rogachev
- Town
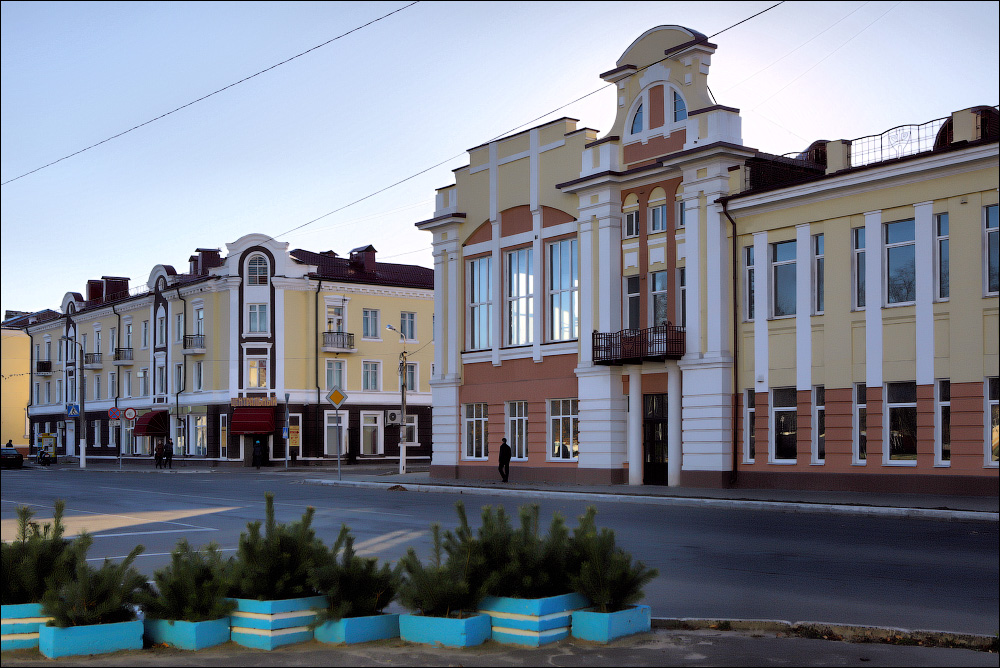

- Flag Coat of arms

- Location within Belarus
- Coordinates: 53°6′N 30°3′E
- Country: Belarus
- Region: Gomel Region
- District: Rahachow District
- Founded: 1142

Area
  - Total: 18.06 km^{2} (6.97 sq mi)
- Elevation: 136 m (446 ft)

Population (2025)
  - Total: 31,490
  - Density: 1,744/km^{2} (4,516/sq mi)
- Time zone: UTC+3 (MSK)
- Postal code: 247250
- Area code: +375 2339
- Licence plate: 3
- Website: Official website (in Russian)

Rahachow or Rogachev (Belarusian: Рагачоў, romanized: Ragachow, IPA: [raɣaˈtʂou̯]; Russian: Рогачёв, romanized: Rogachjov; Polish: Rohaczów; Yiddish: ראגאטשאוו, IPA: [ragat͡ʃov]) is a town in Gomel Region, Belarus. It serves as the administrative center of Rahachow District. Rahachow is located between the Drut and Dnieper rivers. As of 2025, it has a population of 31,490.

== History ==
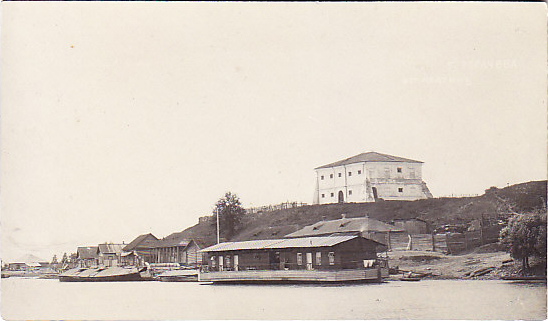
Early-20th-century view of the castle

The town is first mentioned in 1142 in Rus' chronicles. From the thirteenth century it was part of the Grand Duchy of Lithuania, and then the Polish–Lithuanian Commonwealth. During the Lithuanian–Muscovite War of 1487–1494, it was captured and destroyed by Muscovite forces in 1492. From the 16th century it was a royal town, administratively located in the Rzeczyca County in the Minsk Voivodeship. The development of the town was hindered in the 17th century by Cossack and Russian raids, yet it was considered one of the regional centers of trade, intellectual life and manufacturing. Local starosts included members of the Strawiński, Sapieha, Bykowski, Judycki, Ogiński, Nieroszyński and Pociej noble families. At the beginning of the reign of King Stanisław August Poniatowski, the sejmiks (local councils) of the Rzeczyca County were temporarily moved to Rohaczów from Rzeczyca.

In the First Partition of Poland in 1772, the town was annexed by the Russian Empire. In 1777, it became the seat of the Rogachev Uezd within the Mogilev Governorate. In 1781, the coat of arms was granted.

During World War II, Rahachow was occupied by the German Army from 2 July 1941 to 13 July 1941, and again from 14 August 1941 to 24 February 1944.

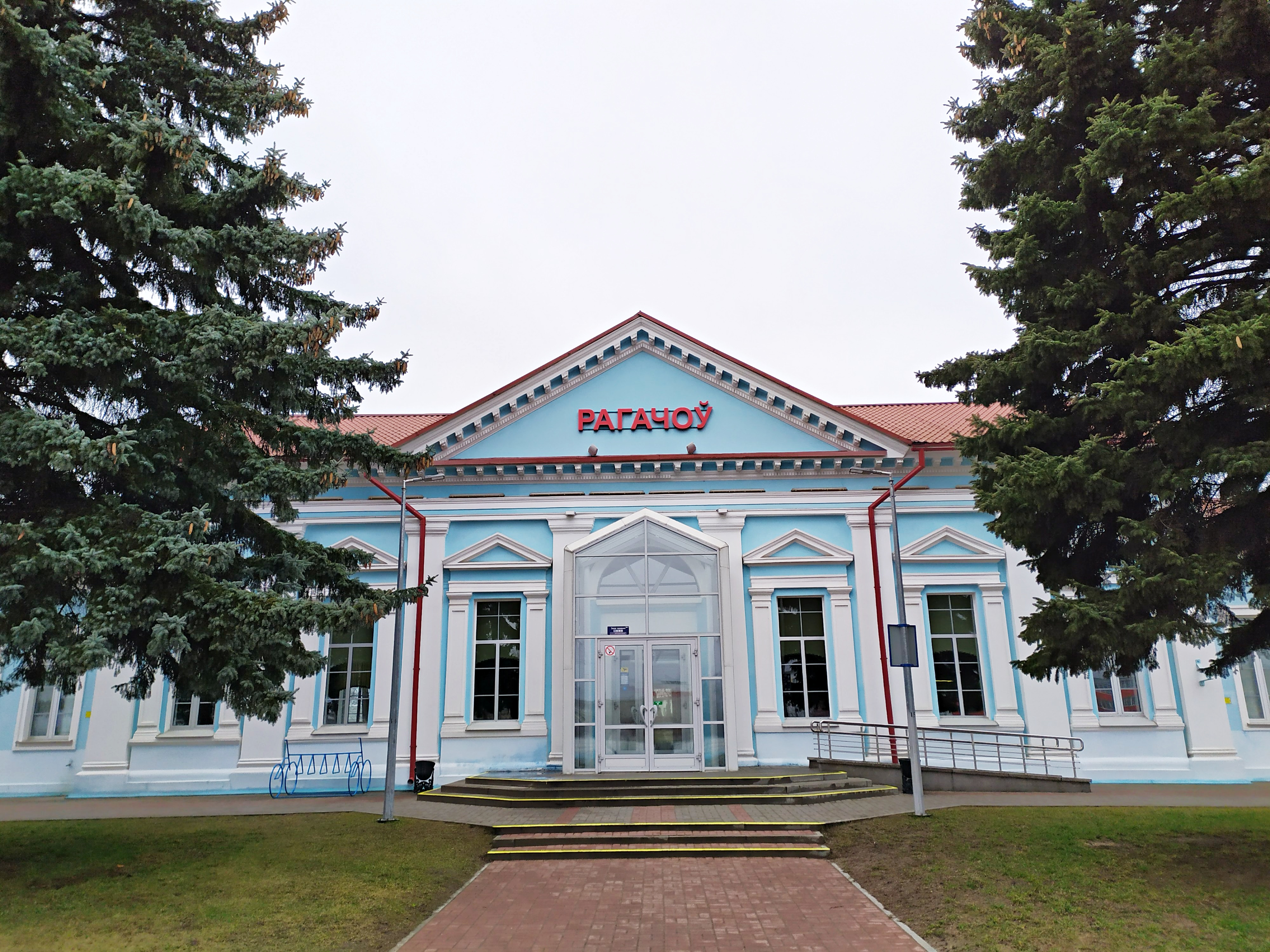
Railway station

== Notable people ==
- Sergei Bautin (1967–2022), ice hockey player
- Anatoli Lvovich Kaplan (1902–1980), artist
- Joseph Rosen (1858–1936), rabbi
- Lyudmila Shagalova (1923–2012), actress
