= Edward Alexander (professor) =

American literary critic (1936–2020)

- Born: 1936; Brooklyn, New York
- Died: August 22, 2020 (aged 83–84); Seattle, Washington
- Awards: Guggenheim Fellowship (1974)

Academic background
- Education: Columbia University (BA); University of Minnesota (PhD)

Academic work
- Discipline: Jewish Studies
- Institutions: University of Washington

Edward Alexander (1936 – August 22, 2020) was an American essayist and professor emeritus of English at the University of Washington. He focused his research on literary figures such as John Stuart Mill, Matthew Arnold, John Morley, John Ruskin, Isaac Bashevis Singer, Lionel Trilling, Irving Howe, and Robert B. Heilman; and authored books about Jewish history, Zionism, and antisemitism.

== Life ==
Edward Alexander was born in Brooklyn, New York. He grew up in the Brownsville section where he attended a Hebrew school located on 500 Herzl Street. As a youth, he idolized Jackie Robinson and David Ben-Gurion.

Alexander earned an A.B. from Columbia College in 1957. He then attended the University of Minnesota, where he received an A.M. in 1959, and a Ph.D. in 1963.

Alexander was awarded a Guggenheim Fellowship in 1974 in the field of "Literary Criticism".

Alexander taught English at the University of Washington from 1960 to 2004 and was the first chairman of UW's Jewish Studies Program. He was a visiting professor at Tufts, Hebrew University, Tel-Aviv University, and Memphis State University.

Alexander was a member the Association of Literary Scholars, Critics, and Writers, the National Association of Scholars, and the Washington Association of Scholars.

Alexander had several cancer surgeries in 2009–2010.

== Writing ==
In The Jewish Idea and Its Enemies (1988), Alexander examined the tension between The Enlightenment ideas of liberalism, rationalism, relativism, and traditional Jewish ideas.

In Jews against Themselves (2015), Alexander explored the contributions apostate Jews made to "the politics and ideology of anti-Semitism."

=== Books ===
- Alexander, Edward (2014). Matthew Arnold and John Stuart Mill. Hoboken: Taylor and Francis. ISBN 978-1135026981. "originally published in London by Routledge & K. Paul (1965)"
- Mill, John Stuart (1967). Alexander, Edward (ed.). Literary Essays. Indianapolis: Bobbs-Merrill.
- Alexander, Edward (1972). John Morley. New York: Twayne Publishers.
- Alexander, Edward (1973). Matthew Arnold, John Ruskin, and the Modern Temper. Columbus: Ohio State University Press. ISBN 0814201881.
- Alexander, Edward (1979). The Resonance of Dust: Essays on Holocaust Literature and Jewish Fate. Columbus: Ohio State University Press. ISBN 0814203035.
- Alexander, Edward (1980). Isaac Bashevis Singer. Boston: Twayne Publishers. ISBN 0805764240.
- Loewenberg, Robert J.; Alexander, Edward, eds. (1988). The Israeli Fate of Jewish Liberalism: Proceedings of a Conference in Jerusalem, 1985, at the Institute for Advanced Strategic and Political Studies. Lanham, Maryland: University Press of America. ISBN 0819170631.
- Alexander, Edward (1988). The Jewish Idea and its Enemies: Personalities, Issues, Events. New Brunswick, New Jersey: Transaction Books. ISBN 0887381758.
- Alexander, Edward (1990). Isaac Bashevis Singer: A Study of the Short Fiction. Boston: Twayne Publishers. ISBN 0805783296.
- Alexander, Edward, ed. (1991). The Middle East: Uncovering the Myths. New York: Anti-Defamation League. ISBN 0884641368. "Papers prepared for a conference sponsored by Writers & Artists for Peace in the Middle East"
- Alexander, Edward, ed. (1993). With Friends Like These: The Jewish Critics of Israel. New York, NY: S.P.I. Books. ISBN 1561710563.
- Alexander, Edward (1994). The Holocaust: History and the War of Ideas. Transaction Publishers. ISBN 1412837227.
- Alexander, Edward (1995). Irving Howe and Secular Jewishness: An Elegy. Cincinnati: Judaic Studies Program, University of Cincinnati.
- Alexander, Edward (1998). Irving Howe — Socialist, Critic, Jew. Indiana University Press. ISBN 0253113210.
- Mill, John Stuart (2001). Alexander, Edward (ed.). The Subjection of Women. New Brunswick, NJ: Transaction Publishers. ISBN 0765807661. "critical edition"
- Alexander, Edward (2002). Classical Liberalism and the Jewish Tradition. Transaction Publishers. ISBN 141281975X.
- Alexander, Edward; Bogdanor, Paul, eds. (2006). The Jewish Divide over Israel: Accusers and Defenders. New Brunswick, NJ: Transaction. ISBN 0765803275.
- Heilman, Robert Bechtold (2009). Alexander, Edward; Dunn, Richard J.; Jaussen, Paul (eds.). Robert B. Heilman: His Life in Letters. Seattle: University of Washington. ISBN 978-0295988665.
- Alexander, Edward (2009). Lionel Trilling & Irving Howe: And Other Stories of Literary Friendship. New Brunswick: Transaction Publishers. ISBN 978-1412815468.
- Alexander, Edward (2011). The Jewish Wars. New Brunswick, N.J.: Transaction Publishers. ISBN 9781412811323.
- Alexander, Edward (2012). The State of the Jews: A Critical Appraisal. New Brunswick, N.J.: Transaction Publishers. ISBN 978-1412846608.
- Alexander, Edward (2015). Jews against Themselves. New Brunswick, New Jersey: Transaction. ISBN 978-1412856225.
