= List of compositions by Dmitry Kabalevsky =

This is a list of compositions by Dmitry Kabalevsky.

== Stage ==
- Op. 24: Colas Breugnon, opera in 3 acts (1936–1938)
- Op. 25: Music to the play Two Songs, after N. Shestakov (1937)
- Op. 28: Golden Ears, ballet in 3 acts (1939–1940)
- Op. 37: In the Fire, opera in 4 acts (1942)
- Op. 47: The Taras Family, opera in 4 acts (1947–1950)
- Op. 53: Nikita Vershinin, opera in 4 acts (1954–1955)
- Op. 58: Song of Spring, operetta in 3 acts (1957)
- Op. 83: The Sisters, opera in 3 acts (1968–1969)
- Op. 90: Colas Breugnon, opera in 3 acts (second version) (1967–1968)

== Orchestral ==
- Symphonies
  - Op. 18: Symphony No. 1 in C♯ minor (1932)
  - Op. 19: Symphony No. 2 in C minor (1934)
  - Op. 22: Symphony No. 3 Requiem, on texts of N. Assayev, for chorus and orchestra (1933)
  - Op. 54: Symphony No. 4 in C minor (1956)
- Op. 24A: Suite from Colas Breugnon (1938)
- Op. 26: The Comedians, suite for small orchestra (1938–1940)
- Op. 28A: Suite from Golden Ears (1939–1940)
- Op. 29: Suite for Jazz Orchestra (1940)
- Op. 56: Romeo and Julia, musical sketches for large symphony orchestra (1956)
- Op. 64: Pathetique Overture (1960)
- Op. 65: Spring, symphonic poem (1960)
- Op. 78: To the Memory of the Heroes of Gorlovka, symphonic picture (1965)
- Op. 85: The Eternal Flame in Bryansk, symphonic poem
- Op. 95: The Heroes of the Revolution of 1905, for wind orchestra (1974)
- Op. 96: ISME-Fanfares (1974)

== Concerto and concertante ==
- Piano
  - Op. 9: Piano Concerto No. 1 in A minor (1928)
  - Op. 23: Piano Concerto No. 2 in G minor (1935)
  - Op. 50: Piano Concerto No. 3 in D major 'Youth' (1952)
  - WoO: Fantasy in F minor after Schubert D 940, for piano and orchestra (1961)
  - Op. 75: Rhapsody on a Theme of the Song Schoolyears, for piano and orchestra (1963)
  - Op. 99: Piano Concerto No. 4 "Prague Concerto" (1975)
- Violin
  - Op. 48: Violin Concerto in C major (1948)
- Cello
  - Op. 49: Cello Concerto No. 1 in G minor (1948–1949)
  - Op. 77: Cello Concerto No. 2 in C minor (1964)

== Vocal orchestral ==
- Op. 12: Poem of Struggle, after A. Sharov, for chorus and orchestra (1930–1931)
- Op. 15: Music to the Radiocomposition Galitsiskaya Zacheria, after B. Yansens, for soloists, chorus and orchestra (1931)
- Op. 31: Parade of the Youth, for children's chorus and orchestra (1941)
- Op. 33: Three Vocal-Monologues, for voice and orchestra (1941)
- Op. 35: Vast Motherland, cantata for mezzo-soprano, bass, chorus and orchestra (1941–1942)
- Op. 36: Revenger of the People, suite on text by Y. Dolmatovski for mixed chorus and orchestra (1942)
- Op. 57: Song of Tomorrow, Spring and Peace, cantata for children's chorus and orchestra (1957–1958)
- Op. 63: The Leninists, cantata after Y. Dolmatovski for three choruses and large symphony orchestra (1958–1959)
- Op. 72: Requiem, on texts by Robert Rozhdestvensky, for soloists, mixed chorus, children's chorus and orchestra (1962)
- Op. 82: On the Motherland, cantata after Z. Solodar, for children's chorus and orchestra (1965)
- Op. 93: A Letter to the 30th Century, oratorio (1972)

== Chamber/instrumental ==
- String quartets
  - Op. 8: String Quartet No. 1 in A minor (1928)
  - Op. 44: String Quartet No. 2 in G minor (1945)
- Violin
  - Op. 21: Improvisation for Violin and Piano (from the music of the film Night of St. Petersburg) (1934)
  - Op. 69: Rondo for Violin and Piano (1961)
  - Op. 80: Pieces for Violin and Piano (1965)
- Cello
  - Op. 2: Two Pieces for Cello and Piano (1927)
  - Op. 68: Etudes in Major and Minor for Cello Solo (1961)
  - Op. 71: Sonata for Cello and Piano, in B♭ major (1962)
  - Op. 79: To the Memory of Sergei Prokofiev, rondo for cello and piano (1965)

== Piano ==
- Op. 1: Three Preludes (1925)
- Op. 3: Album of Children's Pieces (1927–1940)
- Op. 5: Four Preludes (1927–1928)
- Op. 6: Piano Sonata No. 1 in F major (1927)
- Op. 13 No. 1: Piano Sonatina No. 1 in C major (1930)
- Op. 13 No. 2: Piano Sonatina No. 2 in G minor (1933)
- Op. 14: From the Life of a Pioneer, pieces for piano (1931)
- Op. 20: Four Preludes (1933–1934)
- Op. 27: Thirty Children's Pieces (1937–1938)
- Op. 30: Three Pieces (1939)
- Op. 38: Twenty-Four Preludes (dedicated to N. Miaskovsky) (1943–1944)
- Op. 39: 24 Pieces for Children (1944)
- Op. 40: Easy Variations in D major (Toccata) and in A minor (1944)
- Op. 45: Piano Sonata No. 2 in E♭ major (1945)
- Op. 46: Piano Sonata No. 3 in F major (1946)
- Op. 51: Easy Variations, volume 2: Five Variations on Folk-Themes (1952)
- Op. 59: Rondo in A minor (1958)
- Op. 60: Four Easy Rondos (1958)
- Op. 61: Preludes and Fugues (1958–1959)
- Op. 81: Spring-Dances (1965)
- Op. 84: Recitative and Rondo (1967)
- Op. 86: In The Camp of the Pathfinders, six pieces (1968)
- Op. 87: Variations on Folk-Themes (1967)
- Op. 88: Six Pieces (1971)
- Op. 89: Thirty-Five Easy Pieces (1972–1974)
- Op. 93A: Lyric Melodies (1971–1972)

== Vocal/choral ==
- Op. 4: Tanets (song in 4th grade piano exam)
- Op. 7: Two Songs after M. Artamonov and V. Shukovski, for high voice and piano (1928)
- Op. 10: Three Songs after M. Gerassimov, M. Artamonov and N. Kliuyev, for voice and piano (1929–1930)
- Op. 11: Eight Merry Songs after V. Kataev, for voice and piano (1929–1930)
- Op. 16: Three Songs after E. Musam, A. Sharov and A. Surkov, for low voice and piano (1931–1932)
- Op. 17: Eight Songs after O. Vissotskaya, A. Prishelts and A. Barto, for children's chorus and piano (1932)
- Op. 32: Two Songs after A. Bezemenski and N. Vladimirski, for voice and piano (1941)
- Op. 34: Three Songs after Samuil Marshak, for voice and piano (1941)
- Op. 41: Seven Merry Songs after Samuil Marshak, for voice and piano (1944–1945)
- Op. 42: Four Funny Songs after Samuil Marshak and S. Michalkov, for voice and piano (1945)
- Op. 43: Two Russian Folk-Songs, for bass or tenor and piano (1945)
- Op. 43A: Two Russian Folk-Songs, version for mezzo-soprano and piano (1964)
- Op. 52: Ten Shakespeare Sonnets, for voice and piano (1953–1955)
- Op. 55: Two Romances after A. Kovalenkov, for tenor and piano (1956)
- Op. 62: In Fairy Tail's Forrest, musical pictures for narrator, voice and piano (1958)
- Op. 66: The Camp of Friendship, songs of the pathfinders of Artek, for voice or children's chorus and piano (1961)
- Op. 67: A Kitchen-Garden on View, round dances for children's chorus and piano (1961)
- Op. 70: Three Dance-Songs, for voice and piano (1960)
- Op. 73: Three Songs of Revolutionary Cuba, for voice and piano (1963)
- Op. 74: Three Eightlines of R. Gamsatov, for mezzo-soprano and piano (1963)
- Op. 76: Five Romances after R. Gamsatov, for mezzo-soprano and piano (1963–1964)
- Op. 91: Conversation with a Cactus, eight children's songs after V. Viktorov for voice and piano (1969)
- Op. 92: Three songs about Lenin, for children's chorus and piano (1970)
- Op. 94: Three Songs-Plays after I. Rachillo, for children's chorus and piano (1973)
- Op. 97: Songs of Friendship, for female chorus, children's chorus and soprano or tenor (1975)
- Op. 98: Two Youth-Songs after V. Viktorov, for voice and piano (1975)
- Op. 100: Time, six romances after Samuil Marshak for baritone and piano (1975)
- Op. 101: Cry of the Song, cycle of romances after Hovhannes Tumanyan for voice and piano (1978–1979)
- Op. 102: Tanets song in grade 4 piano exam

== Film score ==
- Ivan Pavlov (1949 biographical film)
