= Mark Daniel =

Mark Daniel (January 4, 1900 — November 25, 1940; birth name: Daniel-Mordkhe Meyerovich, later Mark Meyerovich) was a Jewish Soviet writer and playwright. In Yiddish he signed himself as M. Daniel (Yiddish: מ. דאניעל). In Russian he was known as Mark Naumovich Daniel (Марк Нау́мович Даниэ́ль). He was born in Dvinsk, Russian Empire (now Daugavpils, Latvia).

He was the father of Yuli Daniel (Yuli's mother was Minna Pavlovna Daniel, Минна Павловна Даниэ́ль.)

== Notable works ==
=== "Fir teg" ===
The 1930 short story "Yulis" was the basis of the play "Fir teg" ("Four Days"), which was staged by the Moscow State Yiddish Theater starring Solomon Mikhoels as Yulis (the actual person: Iulius Shimeliovich). It turned out to be one of the most notable plays of the theatre despite criticism. Later it was staged in other places.

=== "Zyamke Kapatsh" ===
"Zyamke Kapatsh" (1936, "Zyamke Kapatsh: pyese in dray aktn, zibn bilder". Kharkov: Kinder farlag bam Ts.K.L.K.U.P.O., 1936. YI0802)

"Zyamke Kapatsh" was also staged in Russian under the title "Хлопчик" ("A Lad") by Mossovet Theatre. The play glorifies a heroic deed of a young boy during the Russian Civil War. It is notable, in particular, because the song Orlyonok from the play has become popular in the Soviet Union, with its popularity sharply going up during World War II, especially among the Soviet Partisans.

Over time the song "Orlyonok" effected broad cultural implications in the ideology and mythology of the Soviet Union. In particular, the song gave name to the Young Pioneer Camp Orlyonok and teenager's bicycle Orlyonok/Ereliukas manufactured in the Soviet Union in Belarus and Lithuania. See "Orlyonok (disambiguation)" for more. The song from the Yiddish original had been considerably rewritten several times for ideological reasons.

=== "Johannes Guttenberg" ===
"Johannes Guttenberg" (1937).

In 1939 the Russian-language version of "Johannes Guttenberg" was premiered under the title "Изобретатель и комедиант" ("Inventor and Comedian") by the Central Children's Theatre (now Russian Academic Youth Theatre). The framework of this children's play is the invention of the printing press by Johannes Guttenberg and Gutenberg's misadventures. Another protagonist of the play is Siegfried the comedian, Gutenberg's friend, the voice of common people.

The incidental music for the piece was written by Dmitry Kabalevsky, which gave rise to his orchestral suite The Comedians, commonly described as the most popular work by Kabalevsky.

=== Other ===
Daniel's last play, "Shloyme Maimon" ("Salomon Maimon") premiered in the Moscow State Yiddish Theater in 1940.
