= Aiglon =

Aiglon (French, Eaglet), Aiglons or L'Aiglon may refer to:

== Arts and entertainment ==
- L'Aiglon, a 1900 play by Edmond Rostand
- L'Aiglon (opera), by Arthur Honegger and Jacques Ibert, 1937
- The Eaglet (1913 film), a French silent historical film
- Les Aiglons, a Guadeloupean cadence band

== Sports ==
- Aiglon du Lamentin FC, a Martinique football club
- Aiglons (football club), from Togo, a 1987 FIFA World Youth Championship squad
- OGC Nice, nicknamed Les Aiglons

== Transportation ==
- Alliance (1905 automobile), or Aiglon
- Aiglon (motorcycle), French motorcycle brand 1908–1953
- Caudron C.600 Aiglon, 1930s French light aircraft
- Robin Aiglon, 1980s French light aircraft
- Société Aiglon, an aircraft manufacturer

== Other uses ==
- L'Aiglon, posthumous nickname of Napoleon II (1811–1832), son of Napoleon I
- Aiglon College, in Switzerland
