= Eaglet =

Eaglet may refer to:

- Eaglet, the immature young of an eagle
- HMS Eaglet, the name of several ships and a shore establishment of the Royal Navy
- USS Eaglet, a United States Navy patrol boat in commission 1917–1921
- Tecnam P92 Eaglet, a light aircraft
- American Eagle Eaglet, a light aircraft
- Eaglet, a minor character in the Alice series by Lewis Carroll
- The Eaglet (1931 film), a French historical drama film
- The Eaglet (1913 film), a French silent historical film
- Eaglet (HBC vessel), a Hudson's Bay Company vessel, 1668
- Eaglets, a 1944 Swedish drama film

== See also ==
- Aiglon (disambiguation)
- Eagle (disambiguation)
- Orlyonok (disambiguation) (Russian: Орлёнок 'Eaglet')
- Aiglon (disambiguation) (French, 'Eaglet')
