= Bahur (disambiguation) =

Bahur, in Ashkenazi Jewish history, was a young man studying Talmud.

Bahur may also refer to:

- Alternate spelling of Bahour, India
- Alternate transliteration for bakhoor, incense
- Elijah Bahur or Elijahu haBahur, Elia Levita (1469–1549), Renaissance Hebrew grammarian, scholar, and poet
