= Fir teg =

1931 Yiddish-language play

Fir teg (Yiddish: פיר טעג, 'Four Days') is a 1931 Yiddish language theatrical play written by M. Daniel. The play was based on the 1930 novel Yulis by Daniel, which dealt with the real-life personality of Iulius Shimeliovich - a former member of Bund turned Bolshevik revolutionary. Fir teg became the most popular of Daniel's works. Fir teg was played at Yiddish state theatres across the Soviet Union for over three years.

== Background and Moscow premiere ==
Following the play Der toyber ('The Deaf', 1930) - which used Biblical and Jewish traditional themes - Soviet Yiddish playwrights were instructed to produce theatrical works that specifically dealt with Bolshevik revolutionary struggle and the Russian Civil War. Fir teg was the first Yiddish play produced following this directive. It premiered at the Moscow State Jewish Theatre on 7 November 1931, the fourteenth anniversary of the October Revolution. The play was directed by Sergei Radlov and Solomon Mikhoels. Mikhoels himself starred as the hero Iulius. Isaac Rabinowitz was in charge of scenery and Leo Fulver wrote the music for the play. Benjamin Zuskin portrayed the Polish revolutionary Stanislav Bronievsky.

== Plot ==
Fir teg evolves around the events of the siege by Polish legionnaires of the Vilna Soviet of Workers Deputies in early 1919. Iulius is the central hero character. The name 'Four Days' refers to the days that Bolsheviks in Vilna (Vilnius) waited for the arrival of the Red Army to aid them. Within the Vilna Soviet, where most of the play is set, the Bolshevik characters debate with the nationalist socialist parties over the role of the Soviet. The Bolsheviks are betrayed by the General Jewish Labour Bund and the Polish Socialist Party, allowing the counter-revolutionaries to take control of the city. Faced with the betrayal of the other socialist parties, Iulius and other Bolshevik leaders chose to commit suicide rather than surrendering.

== Critical reception and later adaptations ==
Whilst the play was critically acclaimed as the archetype of Yiddish revolutionary plays, the final suicide scene provoked controversy. Suicide was not the type of sacrifice that communist cultural movement would promote. Soviet critics argued that the revolution possesses no tragedy, solely heroism. Veidlinger (in Bliss Eaton (2002)) argues that the final suicide scene invokes a Jewish historical motif, the mass suicide during the Siege of Masada. However, apart from the usage of Yiddish language, there was no overt Jewish themes in the play.

Fir teg was one of the main plays of the 1932-1933 season at the Artef theatre in New York City, directed by Benno Schneider. A short review in The New York Times stated that "[t]he story is beautifully narrated and equally well portrayed." In 1941 Fir teg was played for the first time in Vilnius, before the German attack on the city.
