= Piano Concerto in G minor =

Piano Concerto in G minor may refer to:

- Piano Concerto No. 1 (Mendelssohn)
- Piano Concerto No. 2 (Saint-Saëns)
- Piano Concerto (Dvořák)
- Piano Concerto No. 2 (Prokofiev)
- Piano Concerto No. 4 (Rachmaninoff)
- Piano Concerto No. 2 (Kabalevsky)
