= Moscow State Jewish Theatre =

Coordinates: 55°45′34″N 37°35′52″E

The Moscow State Jewish (Yiddish) Theatre (Russian: Московский Государственный Еврейский Театр; Yiddish: Moskver melukhnisher yidisher teater), also known by its acronym GOSET (ГОСЕТ), was a Yiddish theatre company established in 1919 and shut down in 1948 by the Soviet authorities. During its time in operation, it served as a prominent expression of Jewish culture in Russia under Joseph Stalin. Under its founding artistic director, Alexander Granowsky, productions were heavily influenced by the avant-garde trends of Europe and many reflected an expressionistic style. Summertime tours to rural shtetls were extremely popular. At the end of a 1928 tour in Germany, Granowsky defected to the west, and Solomon Mikhoels became artistic director in his place. During Mikhoels' tenure the theatre branched out beyond classic Yiddish theatre productions to include works by Soviet Yiddish writers and William Shakespeare. The theatre continued to operate during World War II in Moscow and, after the evacuation of the city in 1941, in Tashkent. Mikhoels was murdered by the MVD in 1948 and his successor, Benjamin Zuskin, was arrested shortly after. In 1948 the Soviet authorities ordered the theatre to be shut down along with all other Yiddish theatre companies in the Soviet Union.

== Founding and early years ==
It was conceived in 1916 and founded in 1919 by Alexander Granowsky as the Jewish Theatre Workshop in St. Petersburg. Early productions were offered at Maly Theatre, a small, 80-seat space. On April 1, 1920, after the capital was changed to Moscow, the company was moved at the request of Anatoly Lunacharsky and became the Moscow State Jewish Theatre. Lunacharsky, the Soviet Minister of Enlightenment at the time, saw the company's potential to spread the Bolshevik message to the Jewish population of Russia and abroad.

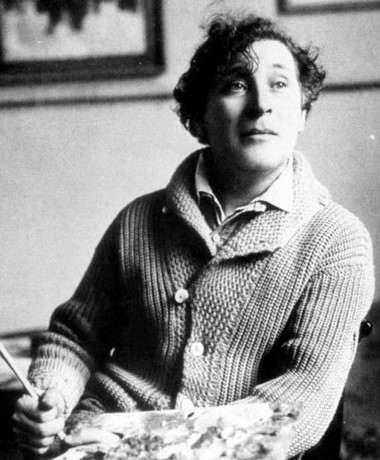
Photograph of Marc Chagall taken in 1921, the same year he would design the sets for GOSET's first Moscow production, An Evening of Sholem Aleichem

Once in Moscow, the company began utilizing a house which was confiscated from a Jewish merchant by the name of L. I. Gurevich who had decided to flee the city around the time of the Russian Revolution. The house, which was built in 1902, consisted of three floors. The second floor featured a large living room that was converted into an auditorium consisting of 90 seats. The kitchen, which was directly adjacent to the new auditorium, was turned into a stage. The first and third floors were reserved for the actors and their families. The house-turned-theatre would later be named Chagall Hall after designer Marc Chagall. The design of the foyer, as well as decorations, sets, and costumes for its first production were done by Chagall. However, this would be Chagall's only collaboration with Granowsky, as the two could not get along.

January 1, 1921 was the date of GOSET's first performance in Moscow, a production called An Evening of Sholom Aleichem. A year later, the company relocated to a substantially larger auditorium on Malya-Bronnaya Street capable of seating 500 people.

== Style and practices ==
Granowsky was heavily influenced by the avant-garde trends of Europe and many of the company's early productions were examples of an expressionistic style. Archetypes, masks, heavy makeup, Cubism, and the grotesque were common staples of the company's performances in the 1920s. German critic Alfred Kerr wrote that Granowsky's productions were one of a kind and gave them high praise. Kerr, a reviewer with a "hard to please" reputation, found Granowsky's use of sound, movement, colour, music. and imagery to be both comedic and terrifying. The critic likened the performances to a humanity circus, noting they were without a single dull moment.

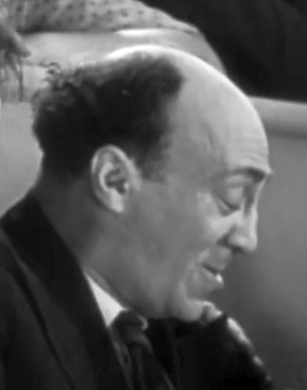
1936 photograph of Solomon Mikhoels, actor and artistic director at GOSET

Unlike many theatre companies, GOSET preferred to train their own performers rather than hire actors and dancers who were already considered professionals. By educating their own, inexperienced actors, the company hoped to avoid performers with the melodramatic style common in other Yiddish theatre troupes. Vsevolod Meyerhold's "biomechanics" was the preferred acting technique used by company members under Granowsky's direction.

In the summertime, the company organized tours to the rural provinces where Yiddish theatre was actually more popular than in the larger cities. Shtetl residents looked forward to GOSET performances given near their small towns each year. Audience numbers averaged 1,250 per night on tour, as opposed to the nightly house average of less than 300 for performances in Moscow. One of the best documented tours visited Kiev, Gomel, Odessa, and Kharkov in the summer of 1924 and offered a variety of short sketches called A Carnival of Jewish Comedy in addition to full-length productions, such as The Sorceress, 200,000, and God of Vengeance.

At the end of GOSET's European tour that took place throughout the majority of 1928, Granowsky chose to remain in Germany, never returning to the Soviet Union. The decision came after years of conflict with Russian authorities over artistic and financial decisions that Granowsky had made for the company. Soon after the theatre's founding, GOSET had attracted Solomon Mikhoels, who eventually became the leading actor; after Granowsky defected to the West, Mikhoels took over as artistic director.

The theatre's repertoire included adaptations of classic works by Sholem Asch, Mendele Mocher Sforim, Sholom Aleichem—such as Tevye the Milkman (also adopted in the West as Fiddler on the Roof)—and Avrom Goldfaden—such as Bar Kokhba. Under Mikhoels' direction, the company began to produce works by contemporary Soviet Yiddish writers, such as Shmuel Halkin, Perets Markish, and David Bergelson. Considered their most popular production, in 1935 the theatre produced William Shakespeare's King Lear to great acclaim with Benjamin Zuskin playing the Fool and Mikhoels in the title role of Lear. The international success of the production meant that Mikhoels had achieved one of the theatre company's founding goals: to make Yiddish a language of art for countries around the world.

Many of the theatre's plays were ostensibly supportive of the Soviet state, but closer readings suggest they actually contained veiled critiques of Stalin's regime, most notably the production of King Lear and the planned production of Richard III. In 1929, in response to a rise in censorship imposed by the government, the company began offering works of Socialist Realism as expected; however, the artists placed Jewish subtext in each production by hiding it within allegory, symbols, and Jewish cultural archetypes. Works of Soviet realism were modestly funded, while works retelling historical Jewish achievements, such as Bar Kochba and the Maccabees, were large-scale productions.

The company's production of Boytre the Bandit in 1936 was a Robin Hood-like story written by Moshe Kulbak. The show celebrated the proletariat, and while praised by the press, it was condemned by Lazar Kaganovich, the most prominent Jewish figure in government. Kaganovich chided Mikhoels and the company members of GOSET for not portraying Jewish people in a positive enough light and requested they stick to productions retelling events similar to Bar Kochba. Shortly after, Boytre the Bandit's author, Kulbak, was arrested, prosecuted in a trial for show, and executed.

In October 1936, the Committee of Artistic Affairs informed Mikhoels that he must move away from Granowsky's style of "formalism" (defined as a "departure from reality") and limit the company's productions to realistic portrayals of Jewish history, Jewish folklore, or Soviet Jewry.

== Productions ==
- 1919: The Blind
- 1919: Sin
- 1919: Thamar and Amnon
- 1919: The Builder
- 1921: An Evening of Sholom Aleichem
- 1921: Before Sunrise
- 1921: God of Vengeance
- 1921: Mystery-Bouffe
- 1922: The Sorceress
- 1922: Uriel Acosta
- 1923: The Carnival of Jewish Masks
- 1923: 200,000
- 1924: Get
- 1924: Three Jewish Raisins
- 1925: A Night in the Old Marketplace
- 1926: The Tenth Commandment
- 1926: 137 Children's Homes
- 1927: The Travels of Benjamin III
- 1927: Trouhadec
- 1927: Uprising
- 1928: Luftmentshn [Men of Air] (see wikt:luftmensch)
- 1928–1929: European Tour
  - 200,000
  - The Sorceress
  - The Travels of Benjamin III
  - Trouhadec
- 1929: The Court is in Session
- 1929: The Dams
- 1930: The Deaf
- 1931: Do Not Grieve!
- 1931: Four Days
- 1932: The Specialist
- 1933: A Measure of Strictness
- 1934: The Millionaire, the Dentist, and the Pauper
- 1935: King Lear
- 1935: Wailing Wall
- 1936: Boytre the Bandit
- 1937: Shulamis
- 1937: Family Ovadis
- 1938: Bar Kokhba
- 1938: Tevye the Milkman
- 1938: Restless Old Age
- 1939: The Banquet
- 1939: Arn Fridman
- 1940: Solomon Maimon
- 1940: Two Schmil Schmelkes
- 1941: Wandering Stars
- 1941: The Spaniards
- 1942: Khamza
- 1942: An Eye for An Eye
- 1942: The Enchanted Tailor
- 1943: Capricious Bride
- 1945: Freylekhs
- 1947: Holiday Eve
- 1947: Sun Doesn't Set
- 1947: Uprising in the Ghetto
- 1947: Tumultuous Forest
- 1948: Zoria Belinkovich
- 1948: Life is Worth Living

== Artists ==
- Aleksey Granovsky (founder, director, Artistic Director 1919–1928)
- Solomon Mikhoels (actor, writer, director, Artistic Director 1928–1948)
  - Lear: King Lear
  - Reb Alter: An Evening of Sholom Aleichem
  - Benjamin: The Travels of Benjamin III
  - Hostmach: The Sorceress
  - Trouhadec: Trouhadec
  - Uriel: Uriel Acosta
  - Menakhem-Mendl: Luftmentshn
  - Iulis: Four Days
  - Berg: The Specialist
  - Zayvl Ovadis: Family Ovadis
  - Tevye: Tevye the Milkman
- Benjamin Zuskin (actor, Artistic Director 1948)
  - Fool: King Lear
  - Baba Iakhna: The Sorceress
  - Senderie: The Travels of Benjamin III
  - Niome Burman: The Court is in Session
  - Anatol: The Millionaire, the Dentist, and the Pauper
  - Boytre: Boytre the Bandit
  - Solomon: Solomon Maimon
  - Shimen-Eli: The Enchanted Tailor
- Sergei Radlov (director)
  - King Lear
  - Do Not Grieve!
- Marc Chagall (designer)
  - An Evening of Sholom Aleichem
- Nathan Altman (designer)
  - 137 Children's Homes
  - Arn Fridman
  - Mystery-Bouffe
- Alexander Krein (composer)
  - A Night in the Old Marketplace
  - 137 Children's Homes
  - The Spaniards
- Isaac Rabinovich (designer)
  - The Sorceress
  - God of Vengeance
- Isaak Rabichev (designer)
  - 200,000
- Lev Pulver (composer)
  - Trouhadec
  - Bar Kokhba
  - Wandering Stars
  - Freylekhs
- Aron Namiot (lighting technician)
- Robert Falk (designer)
  - A Night in the Old Marketplace
  - The Travels of Benjamin III
  - The Spaniards
- Rakhel Imenitova (actor)
- E.Z. Vayner (actor)
- Moshe Goldblatt (actor)
- Peretz Markish (writer)
- Fedor Kaverin (staging and movement)
  - The Court is in Session
  - The Dams
- Hershl Orliand (writer)
  - The Dams
- Aleksandr Tyshler (designer)
  - King Lear
  - Bar Kokhba
  - Wandering Stars
- Vasily Fedorov (staging)
  - Wailing Wall
- Vadim Ryndin (designer)
  - Shulamis
- Leah Rom (actor)
- Iustina Minkova (actor)
  - Mrs. Maimon: Solomon Maimon
  - Etl: Get
  - Three Jewish Raisins
  - The Sorceress
  - The Carnival of Jewish Masks
  - 200,000
  - A Night in the Old Marketplace
  - Fruma: The Tenth Commandment
  - Trouhadec
  - The Travels of Benjamin III
  - Man of Air
  - Freylekhs
  - King Lear
- Etta Kovenskaia (actor)
  - Reysl: Wandering Stars
- Sonia Binnik (actor)
- Sara Rotbaum (actor)
- Eda Berkovskaia (actor)
- Solomon Zilberblat (actor)
  - 200,000
  - Trouhadec
  - King Lear
  - The Travels of Benjamin III
  - Zoria Belinkovich
  - The Deaf
  - The Enchanted Tailor
  - Khamza
  - Family Ovadis
  - The Sorceress
  - The Tenth Commandment
  - 137 Children's Homes
  - Uprising
  - Man of Air
- Alexander Benoit (designer)
  - The Blind
- Joseph Achron (composer)
  - The Blind

== Closure ==
During The Moscow Trials of 1936 to 1938, Mikhoels' daughter confessed that the family lived in fear while witnessing the arrests of many friends and colleagues. Despite the uncertainty of government reactions in the late 1930s, Mikhoels found himself in a position to aid Stalin during World War II by organizing a Jewish resistance movement, the aim of which was to mobilize the world's Jewish population in the struggle against fascism. During the war, GOSET's performances were often interrupted by air-raid sirens that caused both performers and audiences to run for cover underground. Despite this, the company continuously endeavored to offer entertainment to keep the population of Moscow calm and give them an escape from hardships. In October 1941, GOSET was officially restructured by the Committee of Artistic Affairs and its planned productions were replaced by Soviet wartime propaganda pieces. After the evacuation of Moscow, most company members took refuge in Tashkent, Uzbekistan, where they continued to present performances to the Uzbek people. The company returned to Moscow in late 1943.

After World War II, the rise of antisemitism in Russia caused people once referred to as "Brother Jew" to be labeled "Rootless Cosmopolitan", and members of government began to interpret Mikhoels' artistic choices as proof of Jewish nationalism. In January 1948, Mikhoels was murdered by the MVD, and his death was made to look like a car accident. Afterwards, Stalin's daughter, Svetlana, would attribute his murder directly to her father's paranoia of Zionist plots.

After Mikhoels' death, Benjamin Zuskin took became the company's artistic director. Months later, Zuskin was arrested and the theatre received orders to shut down along with all other Yiddish theatre companies in the Soviet Union. In addition, all members of the Jewish Anti-Fascist Committee (also formerly headed by Mikhoels) were arrested. Zuskin was one of at least thirteen prominent Soviet Yiddish artists executed on August 12, 1952, in the event known as "The Night of the Murdered Poets" ("Ночь казненных поэтов").

GOSET may be referred to today as the Moscow State Jewish Theatre, Moscow State Yiddish Theatre, State Yiddish Theatre, Yiddish Chamber Theatre, Yiddish Worker's Theatre, Jewish State Chamber Theatre, State Yiddish Chamber Theatre, or the Yiddish Theatre-Studio.

== See also ==
- History of the Jews in Russia and the Soviet Union

== Bibliography ==
- Veidlinger, Jeffrey (2000). The Moscow State Yiddish Theater: Jewish Culture on the Soviet Stage. Indiana University Press. ISBN 978-0-253-33784-9.
- "Review by J. Hoberman". 2001. Archived from the original on May 10, 2006.
- Veidlinger, Jeffrey (September 3, 2010). "Moscow State Yiddish Theater." YIVO Encyclopedia of Jews in Eastern Europe
- Zuskin-Perelman, Ala (2015). The Travels of Benjamin Zuskin. Translated from the Hebrew by Sharon Blass. With photos. The author is the daughter of Benjamin Zuskin and Eda Berkovsky. Syracuse, NY: Syracuse University Press, 2015. ISBN 9780815653240.
- Riss, Heidelore (2000). Ansätze zu einer Geschichte des jüdischen Theaters in Berlin 1889–1936. Frankfurt am Main: Peter Lang. p. 154
- "Review of the Hebrew work by Michael Handelzalts". 2006. Archived from the original on January 27, 2013.
