= Colas Breugnon =

Colas Breugnon may refer to:

- Colas Breugnon (novel), the 1919 novel by Romain Rolland
- Colas Breugnon (opera), the 1938 opera by Dmitry Kabalevsky, based on Rolland's novel
- an orchestral suite by Tadeusz Baird on themes from the novel
