= CVR =

CVR may refer to:

== Business and economics ==
- Central Business Register (Denmark), the Danish government register of businesses
- Contingent value rights, in corporate finance, rights granted by an acquirer to a company’s shareholder
- Conversion rate, term used to calculate website visitors in Internet marketing

== Human rights ==
- Truth and Reconciliation Commission (Burundi) (French: Commission vérité et réconciliation)
- Truth and Reconciliation Commission of Canada (French: Commission de vérité et réconciliation du Canada)
- Truth and Reconciliation Commission (DRC) (French: La Commission de Verité et de la Réconciliation)
- Truth and Reconciliation Commission (Honduras) (Spanish: Comisión de la Verdad y la Reconciliación)
- Truth and Reconciliation Commission (Peru) (Spanish: Comisión de la Verdad y Reconciliación)

== Transport ==
- Churnet Valley Railway, a heritage railway in Staffordshire, England
- Cimarron Valley Railroad, a railway track in the United states
- Clogher Valley Railway, a former narrow gauge railway in Northern Ireland
- Cockpit voice recorder, a type of aircraft flight recorder that records audio information
- Colne Valley Railway, a heritage railway in Essex, England
- Combat Vehicle Reconnaissance — two British armoured vehicle series:
  - Combat Vehicle Reconnaissance (Tracked), or CVR(T)
  - Combat Vehicle Reconnaissance (Wheeled), or CVR(W)
- C.V.R. (automobile), French car manufacturer (1906–1907)
- CVR, the ICAO airline designator for Chevron, United States

== Other ==
- Cast vote record, containing election data
- Charlie Victor Romeo, a 1999 play and 2013 film
- Chateauguay Valley Regional High School in Ormstown, Quebec, Canada
- Clyde Valley Racing, a British motorsport team
- County of Vermilion River in Alberta, Canada
