= Cello concertos (Kabalevsky) =

Compositions by Dmitry Kabalevsky

Dmitri Kabalevsky composed two cello concertos. He is primarily a pianist and composer for piano. Kabalevsky has a career as a music educator, composer and member of the International Society for Music Education (ISME). Kabalevsky's works have been regarded unfavorably by many because of his associations and allegiance with the Communist Party and is referred to by some as a "Soviet Composer", who was "self-serving, sly, and opportunistic to the extreme." However, his compositions including the two cello concertos are used by various students around the world to learn technique.

== Composer ==
Kabalevsky was elected vice president of the ISME in 1968, during the 8th conference meeting held in Dijon, France. He also had political prestige because of his efforts to reform music education in Soviet Russia. He was awarded the Order of Lenin for his contribution to Russian music education. He also received a Medal of Honour from the Soviet Government "for his musical prowess."

It is generally accepted that a composer's context has a great influence on their compositions. Kabalevsky's life in Russia during the time of the USSR and his career as a music teacher, for example, held particular influences on his works, particularly on his cello concertos. During World War II, Russian and German governments had strict rules about the arts and what was appropriate and they generally preferred pieces that promoted patriotism for their country. As a result, Kabalevsky did not stray too far from traditional Russian music in his cello concertos. The war and post-war context brought new inspiration to many composers including Kabalevsky, as seen by the number of famous compositions that came out of this time. This includes some of the works by Ralph Vaughan Williams, Dmitri Shostakovich and Samuel Barber (amongst many others). The cello itself gained particular attention during this postinter-war-war period, with the composition of several cello pieces such as Prokofiev's Cello Concerto and Shostakovich's pair of Cello Concertos, as well as Kabalevsky's own.

The 20th century brought about a new style known as neoclassicism to which Kabalevsky adhered to in many of his works, but particularly in his cello concertos. This style came about during the inter-war period, where innovation in music was less desirable and where tradition took precedence. The neoclassical style was not rigid in traditional forms however, and there was some room for experimentation.

=== Concerto ===
Kabalevsky's Cello Concertos both follow traditional instrumentation, however, Cello Concerto No. 2 has a more innovative structure than No. 1 which does adhere to traditional concerto structure.

Influences

Kabalevsky drew inspiration from and was influenced by a number of things such as his context of living in Soviet Russia, the neoclassic style that came out of the inter-war period and his esteemed career as a music educator and professional. Some snippets of Eastern Folk Songs also feature in his First Cello Concerto.

== Cello Concerto No. 1 ==
Cello Concerto No. 1 is part of a trilogy of concertos by Kabalevsky and is considered to be the central piece of the trilogy. The other pieces in the trilogy are his Violin Concerto, written in 1948, and Third Piano Concerto, written in 1952. The three concertos were dedicated to students and young performers and were written in a style that was simple enough for a student to play yet challenging enough to progress their musicality and technique. Cello Concerto No. 1 was premiered in 1949 by Sviatoslav Knushevitsky, a Russian cellist who was a student at the time. He was accompanied by the Moscow Conservatory Youth Orchestra.

=== Stylistic features ===
The first cello concerto is in G minor.

Cello Concerto No. 1 follows the traditional structure of a concerto as it has three movements, or sections, which follows sonata form, of "fast-slow-fast". The first section is an Allegro, which means "fast and lively". It is followed by the second movement which is a Largo, meaning "slow" and was dedicated to fallen Russian soldiers in World Wars 1 and 2. The third movement is an Allegro molto, meaning "very swift". As Kabalevsky's First Cello Concerto was written for students, it is not as technically challenging as Concerto No. 2. It has as the features of a conventional concerto including a traditional structure and instrumentation. His use of melody and harmonic structure also followed tradition. Kabalevsky was generally praised by his audiences because of this and received a mostly positive reception to his neoclassic style.

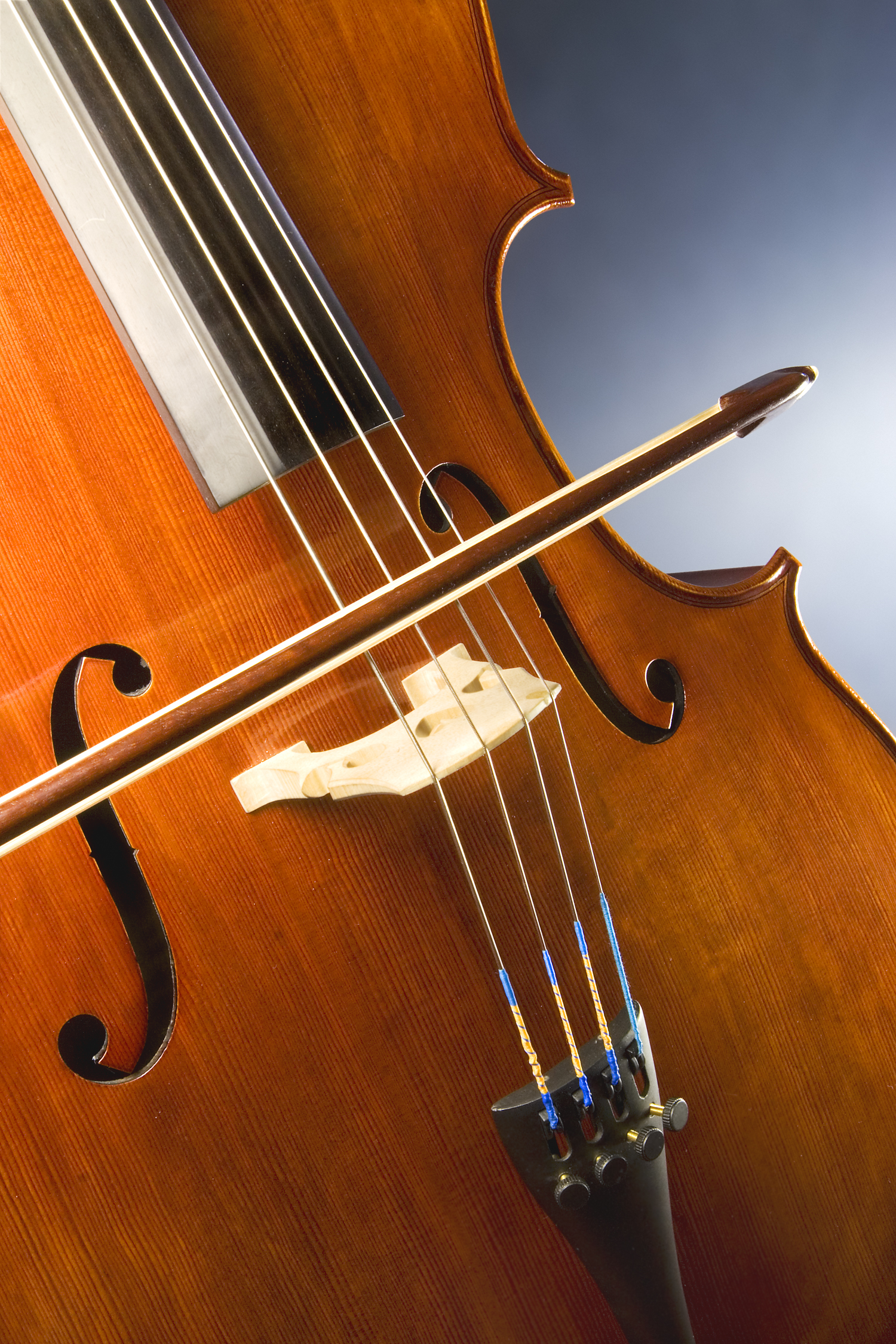
Body of a 3/4 size cello

== Cello Concerto No. 2 ==
The Second Cello Concerto is part of a trilogy of more difficult and dramatic concertos. These pieces are generally considered to be written for music tutors rather than students, as his other concertos were. The other two pieces in the trilogy are Kabalevsky's first two piano concertos. Cello Concerto No. 2 was written in 1964 and premiered by Daniel Shafran that year. Shafran had previously recorded the First Cello Concerto with Kabalevsky.

=== Stylistic features ===
The Second Cello Concerto is in C minor.

Cello Concerto No. 2 does not follow a traditional concerto structure like Concerto No. 1 as it has a slow-fast-slow pattern. This structure was influenced by Kabalevsky's teacher, Nikolai Myaskovsky. The movements are as follows:

1. Molto sostenuto – Allegro molto e energico (Very sustained – quick with much energy)
2. Presto marcato (fast, accented)
3. Andante con moto – Allegro agitato – Molto tranquillo (moderately slow with movement – fast and restless – very calm)

The movements of Cello Concerto No. 2 are played attacca, meaning the piece continues without breaks between the movements. This was an unusual feature of the concerto.

The instrumentation of the orchestral accompaniment to the solo cello is fairly standard, except for the inclusion of the alto saxophone.

Unlike Cello Concerto No. 1, Cello Concerto No. 2 is very raw in its expression and deviates from Soviet tradition. This is unusual for Kabalevsky as this sort of style does not appear in many of his compositions, particularly those during the reign of the USSR.

=== Influences ===
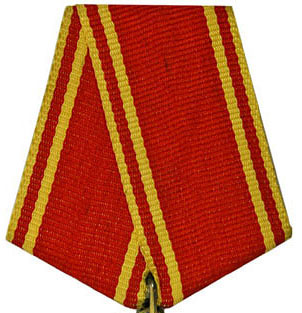
The Order of Lenin ribbon

Nikolai Myaskovsky held a great influence on Kabalevsky's Second Cello Concerto as he was Kabalevsky's music teacher at the Moscow Conservatory. Myaskovsky was also awarded with the Order of Lenin and held the rank of General in the Russian Army during World War II. Although Myaskovsky had a good reputation with the Soviet Union to start with, his compositions began to drift away from what was acceptable and was accused of "injecting inharmonious music into the Soviet Educational System". However, his generous teaching earned him the title of "the musical conscience of Moscow". Myaskovsky experimented with modernist music particularly in harmony and form. Kabalevsky likely drew inspiration from Myaskovsky's experimentation in his Cello Concerto No. 2. This is evident in the changed form of the concerto, the movements structured as slow-fast-slow rather than fast-slow-fast. It is also evident in Kabalevsky's more harrowing and emotional harmonies in the Second Cello Concerto.
