= Mendele Mocher Sforim =

Belarusian-Ukrainian Jewish author

- מענדעלע מוכר־ספֿרים (Yiddish)
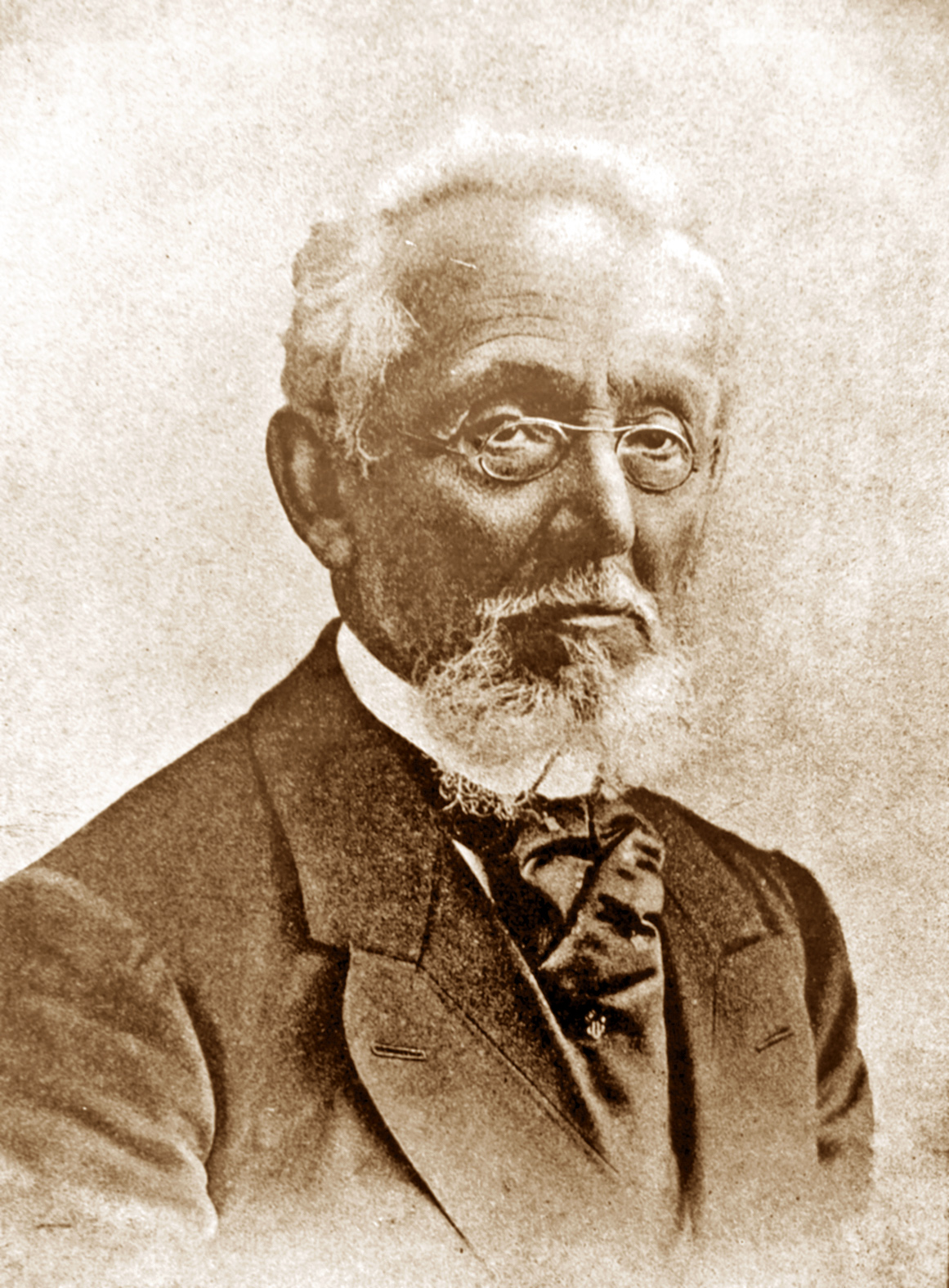
- Born: Sholem Yankev Broyde; January 2, 1836; Kapyl, Russian Empire
- Died: December 8, 1917 (aged 81); Odesa, Ukrainian People's Republic
- Other name: Sholem Yankev Abramovich
- Occupation: Author
- Known for: Being one of the founders of modern Yiddish and Hebrew literature

Mendele Mocher Sforim (Note: Variously transliterated as Moykher, Sfarim, Seforim, etc. Yiddish: מענדעלע מוכר־ספֿרים; Hebrew: מנדלי מוכר ספרים, lit. 'Mendele the book peddler'.) (official name: Sholem Yankev Abramovich; (Note: His birth name was Sholem Yankev Broyde (Russian: Шолем-Янкев Бройде). He obtained the surname "Abramovich" when he was issued a passport. His name was also written as S. J. Abramowitch. Yiddish: שלום יעקבֿ אַבראַמאָװיטש; Russian: Соломон Моисеевич Абрамович, romanized: Solomon Moiseyevich Abramovich. (Note: In this name that follows East Slavic naming customs, the patronymic is Moiseyevich and the family name is Abramovich.)) January 2, 1836 – 8 December [O.S. 25 November] 1917) was a Belarusian Jewish author and one of the founders of modern Yiddish and Hebrew literature.

== Youth ==
Mendele was born to a poor Lithuanian Jewish family in Kapyl, Minsk Governorate, Russian Empire. His father, Chaim Moyshe Broyde, died shortly after Mendele's bar mitzvah. He studied in yeshiva in Slutsk and Vilna until he was 17; during this time he was a day-boarder under the system of Teg-essen, barely scraping by, and often hungry.

Mendele traveled extensively around Belarus, Ukraine and Lithuania at the mercy of an abusive beggar named Avreml Khromoy (Russian for "Avreml the Lame"); Avreml would later become the source for the title character of Fishke der Krumer (Fishke the Lame). In 1854, Mendele settled in Kamianets-Podilskyi, where he got to know writer and poet Avrom Ber Gotlober, who helped him to understand secular culture, philosophy, literature, history, Russian and other languages.

== Early work ==
Mendele's first article, "Letter on Education", appeared in 1857, in the first Hebrew newspaper, Hamagid; his mentor Gotlober submitted Mendele's school paper without Mendele's prior knowledge. In Berdichev, where he lived from 1858 to 1869, he began to publish fiction both in Hebrew and Yiddish. Having offended the local powers with his satire, he left Berdichev to train as a rabbi at the relatively theologically liberal, government-sponsored rabbinical school in Zhitomir, where he lived from 1869 to 1881, and became the head of the traditional school (Talmud Torah) in Odessa in 1881. He lived in Odessa until his death in 1917, except for two years spent in Geneva, where he fled the government-inspired pogroms following the failed revolution of 1905.

== Grandfather of Yiddish literature ==
Mendele initially wrote in Hebrew, coining many words in that language, but ultimately switched to Yiddish in order to expand his audience. Like Sholem Aleichem, he used a pseudonym because of the contemporary perception of Yiddish as a ghetto vernacular unsuitable for serious literary work — an idea he did much to dispel. His writing strongly bore the mark of the Haskalah. He is considered by many to be the "grandfather of Yiddish literature", an epithet first accorded to him by Sholem Aleichem, in the dedication to his novel Stempenyu: A Jewish Novel. Mendele's style in both Hebrew and Yiddish has strongly influenced several generations of later writers.

While the tradition of journalism in Yiddish had a bit more of a history than in Hebrew, Kol Mevasser, which he supported from the outset and where he published his first Yiddish story, Dos kleyne Mentshele, 'The Little Man', in 1863, is generally seen as the first stable and important Yiddish newspaper.

== Ideology and later work ==
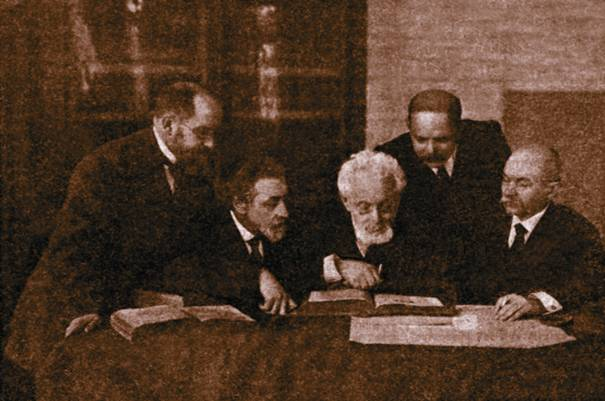
The Odessa literary group in 1916; from left to right: Yehoshua Ravnitzky (1859-1944), Shloyme Ansky, Mendele, Hayim N. Bialik, Simon Frug.

Sol Liptzin writes that in his early Yiddish narratives, Mendele "wanted to be useful to his people rather than gain literary laurels". Two of his early works, the story דאס קליינע מענטשעלע, Dos kleyne mentshele and the unstaged 1869 drama Di Takse (The Tax), condemned the corruption by which religious taxes (in the latter case, specifically the tax on kosher meat) were diverted to benefit community leaders rather than the poor. This satiric tendency continued in Di Klatshe (The Nag, 1873) about a prince, a stand-in for the Jewish people, who is bewitched and becomes a much put-upon beast of burden, but maintains his moral superiority throughout his sufferings (a theme evidently influenced by Apuleius's classical picaresque novel The Golden Ass).

His later work became more humane and less satiric, starting with פישקע דער קרומער, Fishke der Krumer (Fishke the Lame; written 1868-1888) – which was adapted as a film of the same title in 1939 (known in English as The Light Ahead) – and continuing with the unfinished The Travels of Benjamin III (מסעות בנימין השלישי, Masoes Benyomin Hashlishi, 1878), something of a Jewish Don Quixote. (The title is a reference to the well-known travel book of the Medieval Spanish-Jewish traveller Benjamin of Tudela.) In 1938, this work was adapted by Hermann Sinsheimer as a play for the Jüdischer Kulturbund in Germany, and performed there shortly after Kristallnacht (the Night of Broken Glass), in November of that year.

As with Fishke, Mendele worked on and off for decades on his long novel Dos Vinshfingeril (The Wishing Ring, 1865–1889), with at least two versions preceding the final one. It is the story of a maskil — that is, a supporter of the Haskalah, like Mendele himself — who escapes a poor town, survives misery to obtain a secular education much like Mendele's own, but is driven by the pogroms of the 1880s from his dreams of universal brotherhood to one of Jewish nationalism. The first English translation, by Michael Wex (author of Born to Kvetch), was published in 2003.

== Works ==
- "Das Wunschfingerl", translated from the Yiddish by Michael Wex as The Wishing-Ring
- Limdu hetev (Learn to Do Good, 1862-) (Note: Limdu Hetev, or Learn to Do Well, full title: Hebrew: למדו היטב: הוא ספור אהבים. "Limdu Hetev" is a biblical allusion: למדו היטב דרשׁו משׁפט אשׁרו חמוץ שׁפטו יתום ריבו אלמנה "Learn to do good. Devote yourselves to justice; aid the wronged; Uphold the rights of the orphan; defend the cause of the widow." – Isaiah 1:17).
- דאס קליינע מענטשעלע, Dos kleyne mentshele, 1864
- Die Taxe oder die Bande Stodt-Baal-Tobes (The Tax, 1869), satirical play
- Di Klatshe (The Nag, 1873)
- פישקע דער קרומער, Fishke der Krumer (Fishke the Lame; written 1868-1888)
- Beémek Habakhá ("In the Vale of Tears"): Yiddish title: "Dos vintshfingerl" ("The Wishing Ring", 1865–1889)
- The Travels of Benjamin III (מסעות בנימין השלישי, Masoes Benyomin Hashlishi, 1878)
- "The Burned-Out" ("Ha-nisforim, 1896)
- autobiographical Shloyme Reb Khayims: A bild fun yídishn lebn in der Líte ("Shloyme, son of Reb Khayim: An Image of the Yiddish Life in Lithuania"; never completed; 1899–1912)
- “BeSeter ra'am” (Hebrew: בסתר רעם, In the Secret Place of Thunder; 1886–1887) (Note: "Beseter ra'am" is a allusion to an expression in Psalms 81:7 variously translated as "in the secret place of thunder", "hidden in thunder", etc.)
- “Shem va-Yefet ba-‘agalah” (Shem and Japheth in the Train Compartment; 1890),
- “Lo naḥat be-Ya‘akov” (There Is No Good in Jacob; 1892),
- “Bi-Yeme ha-ra‘ash” (In Days of Tumult; 1894)
- “Bi-Yeshivah shel ma‘alah uvi-yeshivah shel mata” (In the Heavenly Assembly and the Earthly One; 1894–1895)
