= Couverchel =

French automobile

The Couverchel was a French automobile manufactured from 1905 to 1907. The firm offered cars ranging from 12/16 hp to a 40/50 hp six. The company moved to Boulogne-sur-Seine from Neuilly in 1906, prompting a change in its name to C.V.R.
