= Book peddler =

Travelling book sellers

Book peddlers were travelling vendors ("peddlers") of books. This occupation had its peculiarities in various countries.

== United States ==
=== Book peddlers and evangelicals in early United States ===
In the country with no single "state-sponsored" religious denomination, travelling evangelists played an important role. Selling pamphlets and books, especially the Bible, were often an additional source of income of travelling preachers. Among the best organized booksellers were the American Bible Society and the American Tract Society, which had significant forces of colporteurs. "Evangelical preachers pioneered many techniques that salespeople would later adopt."

=== Book canvassers ===
Door-to-door book peddlers of the 18th and 19th centuries, also known as "book canvassers", used to carry special "sample books", a kind of "preview", with a table of contents, sample illustrations and some text, designed to advertise the book in question. Canvassing subscription sales were the only way to deliver books to many rural areas of America.

Hawkers (peddlers) were often frowned upon by the law, but book peddlers were treated differently. For example, Massachusetts and Missouri excepted book peddlers from laws imposing penalties on unlicensed hawkers.

== Russian Empire ==
=== Lithuania ===
When printing Lithuanian language books in Latin alphabet was forbidden in Russian Empire, book peddlers, knygnešiai in Lithuanian, smuggled the books printed abroad, in Lithuania Minor, under the threat of criminal prosecution. This activity played an important role in preservation of the Lithuanian culture, and in modern Lithuania knygnešiai are commemorated in museums, monuments, street names, and their remembrance day.

=== Evangelism ===
In 1866, the "Society for Distribution of the Holy Scripture in Russia" (“Высочайше утверждённое Общество для распространения Священного Писания в России”) was established in St. Petersburg, with subsidiaries in Moscow established in early 1880s. In addition to the initial goal of peddling the Christian literature, they started to arrange religious discussion meetings. Eventually the activities of the society were frowned upon by the administration of the Russian Church for their independence and liberalism and closeness to the Tolstoyans. After various restrictions put forth by the infamous Ober-Procurator of the Holy Synod Konstantin Pobedonostsev, the activity of the society dwindled.

The Seventh-day Adventists, persecuted in Russia, employed colportage of literature published abroad and smuggled into Russia, under the threat of arrest, fine, and confiscation.

== Japan ==
The tradition of book peddling traces back to the Edo period. Taro Aso, Minister for Foreign Affairs of Japan, in his speech in the Japan Institute of International Affairs (2006) describes them as follows.

If you look for example at the book lenders of the day, it seems that a single book lender would have over a hundred customers. When a new title was released, the book lenders would put it into a bag and take it round to their customers. The customers would then slice open the seal on the bag to get the latest release. This, incidentally, is where the word for "the latest release", fukiri — literally "seal-slicing" — has its origins, and we still use that word to this day, although in recent years to describe the release of new movies.

== See also ==
- Bookmobile
- Chapbook
- Mendele Mocher Sforim, (also known as "Mendele the book peddler")
