= Colportage =

Type of book distribution network

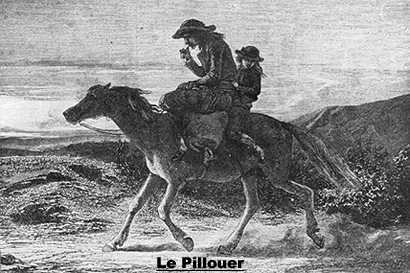
Colporteur during the 19th century in Brittany.

Colportage is the distribution of publications, books, and religious tracts by carriers called "colporteurs" or "colporters". The term does not necessarily refer to religious book peddling.

== Etymology ==
From French colportage, where the term is an alteration of comporter, 'to peddle', as a portmanteau or pun with the word col (Latin collum, 'neck'), with the resulting meaning 'to carry on one's neck'. Porter is from Latin portare, 'to carry'. The term was first used by Bible salesmen working for the British and Foreign Bible Society in southern France in the Pyrenees.

== History ==
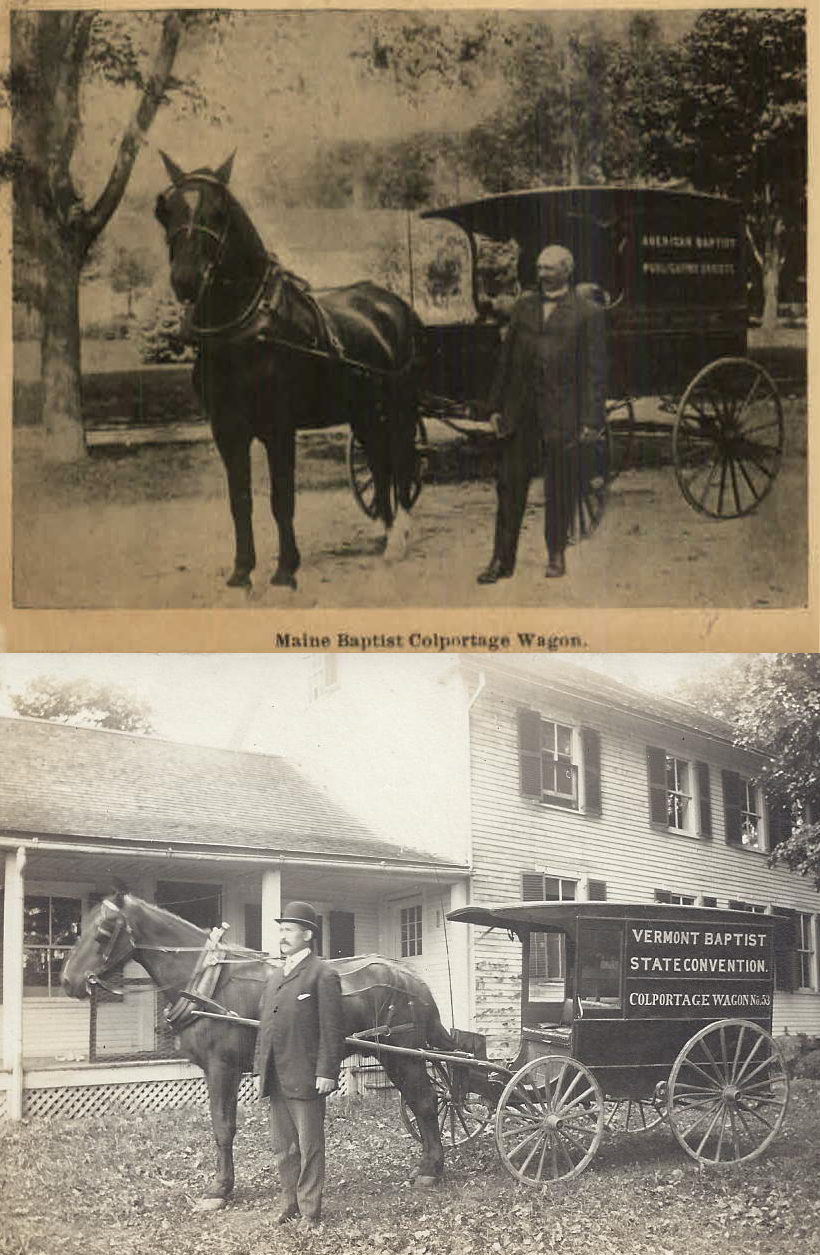
Maine (1905) and Vermont (1907) Baptist Colportage Wagons, with colporters.

Colportage became common in Europe with the distribution of contending religious tracts and books during the religious controversies of the Reformation. In addition to controversial works, the itinerant book-peddling colporteurs also spread widely cheap editions of the popular works of the day to an increasingly literate rural population which had little access to the book shops of the cities.

The American Tract Society (ATS) is often credited as one of the first organizations in the United States to be involved in colportage. ATS is an evangelical organization established in 1825 to distribute Christian literature.

In Christ in the Camp: or, Religion in Lee's Army (1887), Dr. John William Jones refers to the chaplains carrying bibles and tracts during the American Civil War as colporteurs. The American Bible Society and the American Tract Society were among the largest organizations involved in colportage in the United States.

D. L. Moody founded the "Bible Institute Colportage Association" in 1894 to distribute tracts and books. Now known as Moody Publishers, they continue to publish religious materials with proceeds supporting the Moody Bible Institute.

The Seventh-day Adventist Church calls their book distributors "literature evangelists", but until about 1980, the term colporteur was used to describe SDA literature evangelists.

Jehovah's Witnesses who were active in the full-time ministry were called colporteurs until 1931. Today, those participating in the full-time ministry are called "pioneers".

== Colportage novels ==
Colportage novels were serial novels, sold door-to-door by colporters, popular in the late 19th century. Buyers would purchase a subscription to future novels in the series. One popular subject was fictionalization of current events; for example, the early volumes of a serial colportage novel about Franco-Prussian War (1870-71) were already being sold in 1870. One author of colportage novels was Karl May.

== Bible Institute Colportage Association (BICA) ==
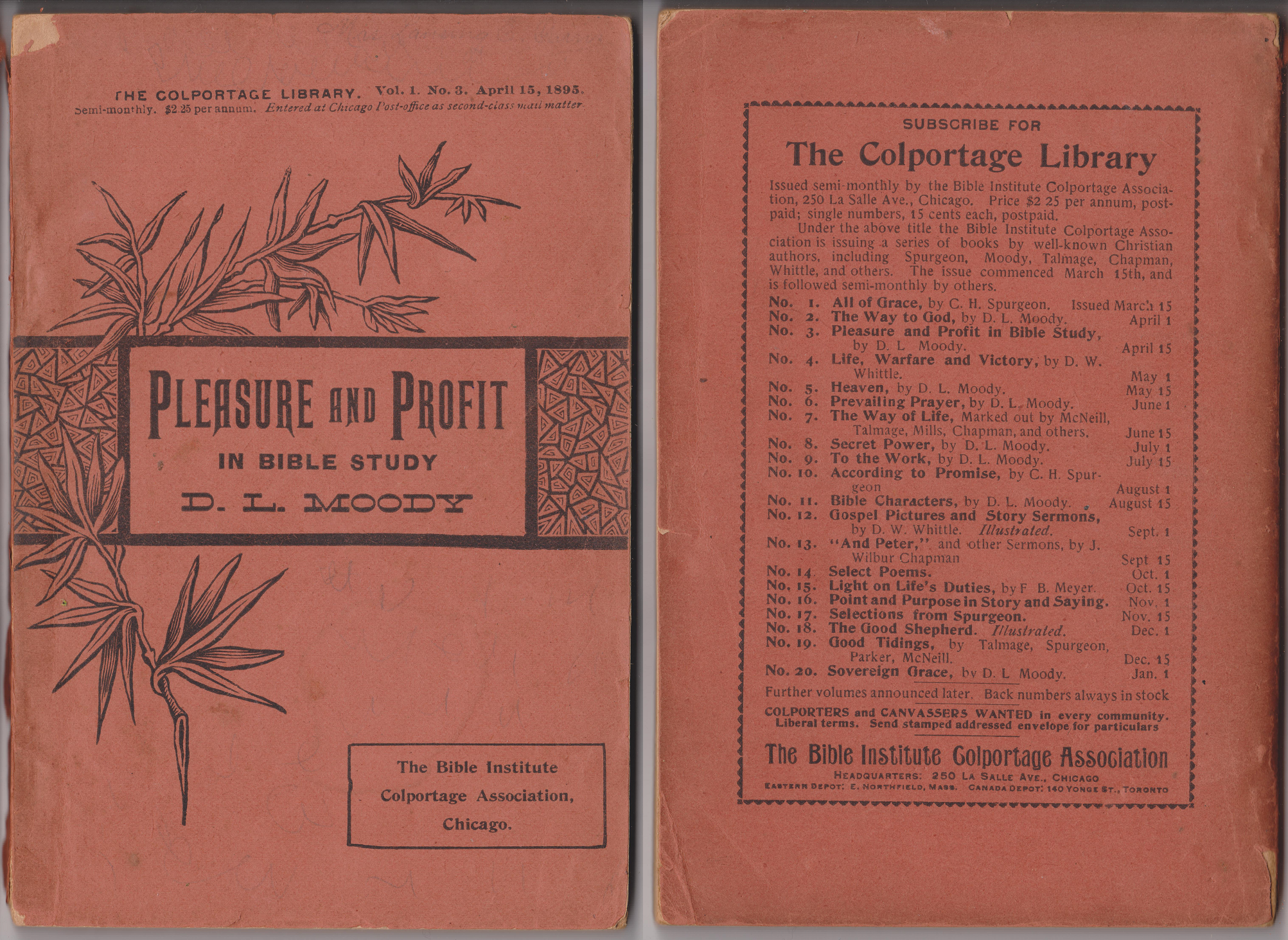
Moody, D. L. (1895). Pleasure and Profit in Bible Study. Colportage Library Vol.1 No.3, 1st Edition: 142 pp, 16mo, 4 7/8 x 7 1/4 inches. Stapled (2) with paper wraps.

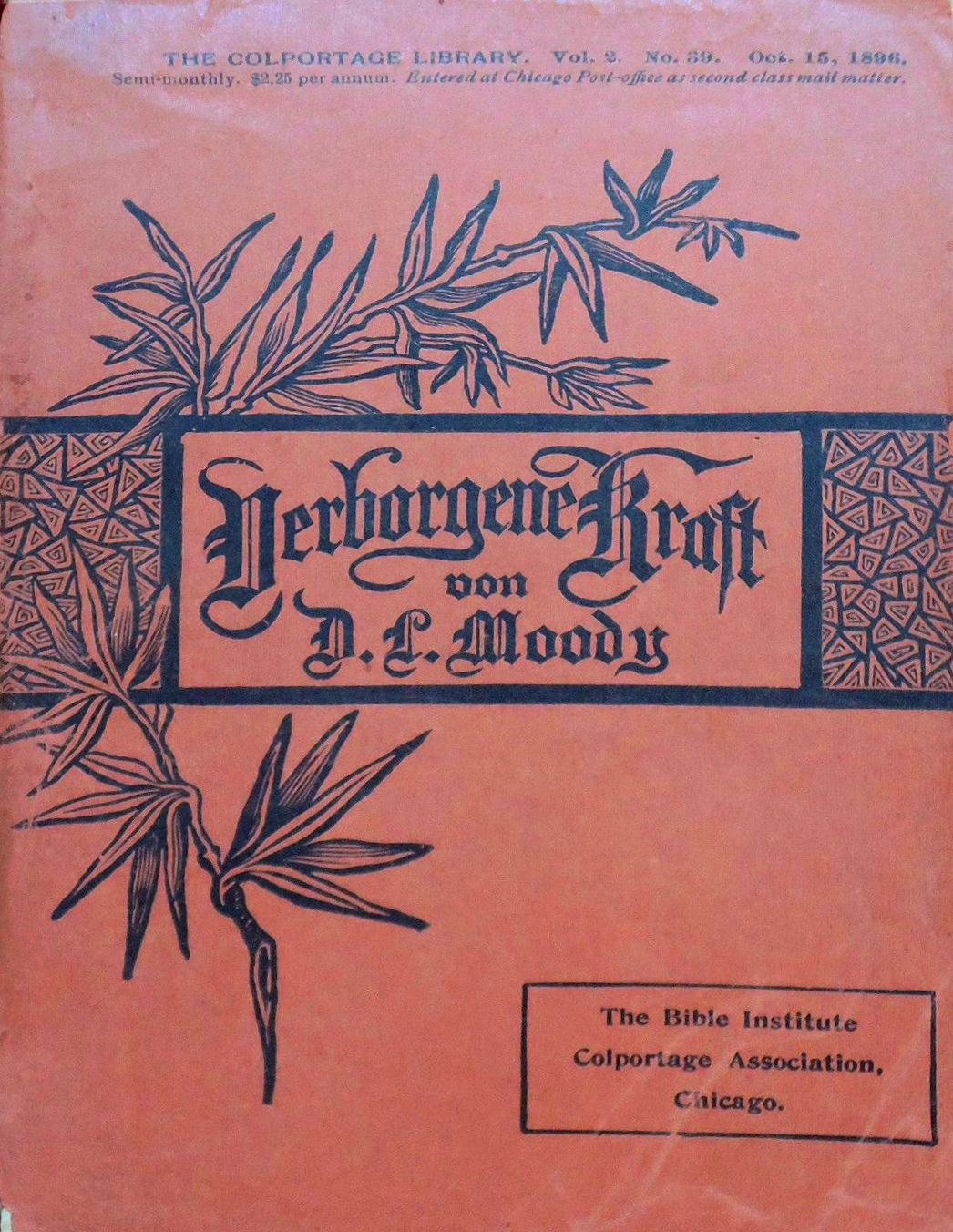
Moody, D. L. (1896). Verborgene Kraft. Colportage Library Vol.2 No.39, 1st Edition.

D. L. Moody founded the Bible Institute Colportage Association (BICA) in 1894 to provide a source for inexpensive Christian literature. Moody's son-in-law, A. P. Fitt, managed BICA operations. Publishing was contracted to Moody's brother-in-law, Fleming Revell, and his upstart publishing company. In 1895 the Colportage Library began the publication at regular intervals of books which met five specific criteria: 1. a popular readable style; 2. well-known authors or books of existing reputation; 3. strictly evangelical and nondenominational works; 4. good workmanship, and; 5. low price.

Volume 1, Number 1, "All of Grace," by C. H. Spurgeon, issued March 15, 1895 and sold for ten cents directly from a colporter. Library subscription price, "$2.25 per annum, postpaid; single numbers 15 cents each, postpaid."

In 1906 the Institute reported, “[t]he volume of business transacted was $76,855.33 as compared with $49,484.23 in 1905. The sale of Colportage Library books was 192,308 copies as compared with 192,490 copies in 1905. The vitality of this series is shown by the constant demand for even the earliest numbers, there being 196,509 reprints in all during 1906. 236,877 copies of the Emphasized Gospel of John were published during 1906. Retail mail order business amounted to $10,839.50 as compared with $8,221.11 in 1905. 100 colporters (about) at work at any one time. Fifteen regular employees at Association's headquarters in Chicago. Twenty-two depots of supply for the Association's colporters in the United States and elsewhere.”

By January 1, 1917, 126 titles had issued, totaling 6,718,313 copies printed. Foreign-language editions included German, Danish-Norwegian, Swedish, Spanish, Italian and Bohemian publications, with requests for translations in Polish, Dutch, French, and other languages.

In 1941, after more than 12 million books in this series had been sold, BICA became Moody Press.
