= Benjamin of Tudela =

Jewish explorer and writer (1130–1173)

- בִּנְיָמִין מִטּוּדֶלָה
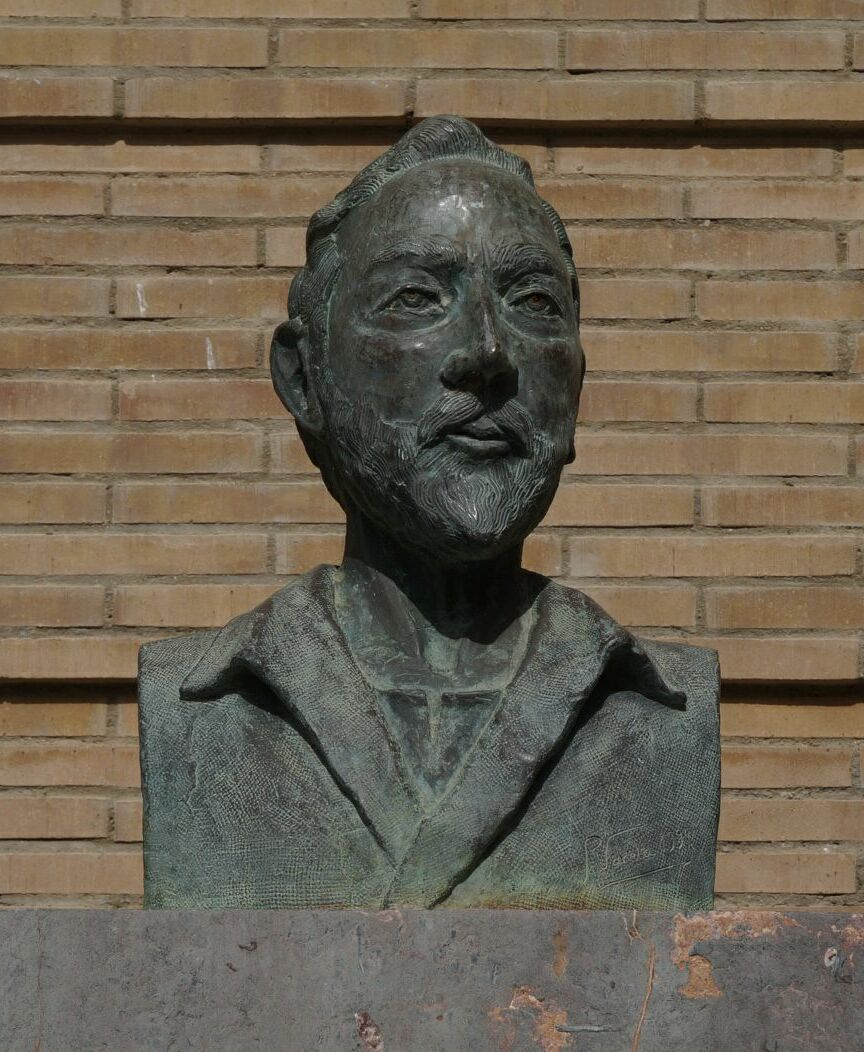
- Bronze bust of Benjamin by Ricardo Varela Andrés in Tudela, Navarre, 1994
- Pronunciation: binjaˈmin mituˈdela
- Born: 1130; Tudela, Kingdom of Navarre
- Died: 1175 (aged 45); Kingdom of Castilla
- Other names: Benjamin ben Jonah
- Years active: c. 1159 – 1173
- Known for: Travels throughout the Old World

Benjamin of Tudela (Note: Hebrew: בִּנְיָמִין מִטּוּדֶלָה, pronounced [binjaˈmin mituˈdela]; Arabic: بنيامين التطيلي, Binyamin al-Tutayli) (1130 – 1175), also known as Benjamin ben Jonah, was a medieval Tudelano Jewish traveler who visited Europe, Asia, and Africa in the twelfth century. His vivid descriptions of western Asia preceded those of Marco Polo by a hundred years. With his broad education and vast knowledge of languages, Benjamin of Tudela is a major figure in medieval geography and Jewish history.

The Travels of Benjamin is an important work not only as a description of the Jewish communities, but also as a reliable source about the geography and ethnography of the Middle Ages. Some modern historians credit Benjamin with giving accurate descriptions of everyday life in the Middle Ages. Originally written in Hebrew, his itinerary was translated into Latin and later translated into most major European languages. It received much attention from Renaissance scholars in the sixteenth century.

His journeys reveal the concurrent interconnectedness and diversity of Jewish communities during this time period.

== Personal life ==
Little is known of his personal life, apart from the fact that he was a native of Tudela in the Kingdom of Navarre, that he lived during the second half of the 12th century and that his father's name was Jonah. He is often referred to as Rabbi by non-Jewish sources, although there is no reliable evidence that he was ever one.

== Journey ==
There is no consensus among scholars as to Benjamin of Tudela's exact route, although most scholars believe from his itinerary that he travelled on a popular route frequented by travelers at the time. Benjamin set out on his journey from the northeast Iberian Peninsula around 1165, in what may have begun as a pilgrimage to the Holy Land. It has been suggested he may have had a commercial motive as well as a religious one. Several times the subject shows an interest in the coral trade, perhaps as a professional gem-merchant. On the other hand, he may have intended to catalog the Jewish communities en route to the Land of Israel to provide a guide where hospitality could be found for Jews traveling to the Holy Land, or for those fleeing oppression elsewhere. He stopped frequently, meeting people, visiting places, describing occupations, and giving a demographic count of Jews in each town and country that he visited. Benjamin provided his own evaluations of various cultures he encountered and, sometimes, drew parallels between customs he encountered.

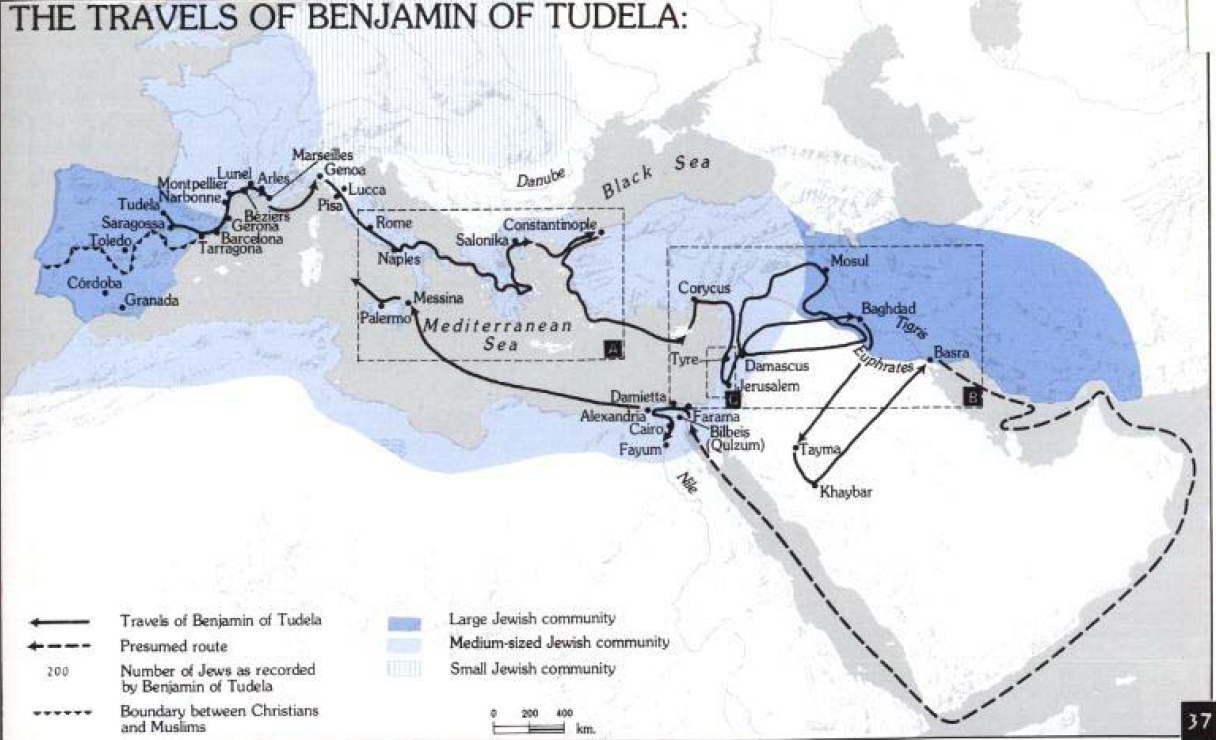
Map of route

His journey began in Zaragoza, farther down the valley of the Ebro to Tarragona, Barcelona, and Girona, whence he proceeded north to France, then set sail from Marseille. After visiting Genoa, Lucca, Pisa, Florence and Rome, he went to Greece and Constantinople, then set off across Asia. He visited Syria, Lebanon, the Land of Israel, and northern Mesopotamia (which he called Shinar) before reaching Baghdad. From there he went to Persia, then cut back across the Arabian Peninsula to Egypt and North Africa, returning to the Iberian Peninsula in 1173. In his travels, he described a significant Jewish community somewhere around modern-day Ethiopia. While it appears clear that such a community existed, scholars still struggle to decide where in Africa he actually visited—a lack of uniform spelling makes it hard to distinguish what places Benjamin and other contemporary travel writers are actually referencing.

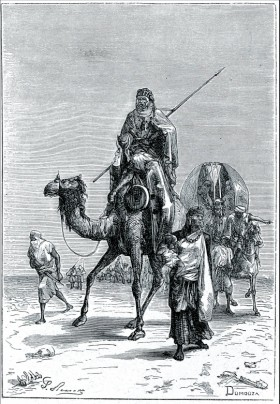
Benjamin of Tudela in the Sahara (Author : Dumouza, 19th-century engraving)

His visit to the ruins outside Mosul is one of the earliest accurate descriptions of the site of ancient Nineveh. He visited 300 cities in all, including many of importance in Jewish history, such as Susa, Sura, and Pumbedita. In addition, he gathered information on many more areas that he heard about in his travels, including China and Tibet. He recorded details on cultures such as that of Al-Hashishin, the hemp smokers, introducing Western Europeans to people and places far beyond their experience.

He described his years abroad in a book, The Travels of Benjamin (מסעות בנימין, Masa'ot Binyamin, also known as ספר המסעות, Sefer ha-Masa'ot, The Book of Travels), which describes the countries he visited, with an emphasis on the Jewish communities, including their total populations and the names of notable community leaders. He also described the customs of the local population, both Jewish and non-Jewish, with an emphasis on urban life. In his accounts, Benjamin of Tudela describes Baghdad with great enthusiasm, making particular note of the virtues of the Caliph. He often writes of the respect and intermingle that he encounters between Judaism and Islam. He gave detailed descriptions of sites and landmarks passed along the way, as well as important buildings and marketplaces. Although Benjamin is noted for citing sources and is generally regarded by historians as trustworthy, some of his claims are faulted as relying on earlier writers. For instance, Benjamin's identification of Laish (Tel Dan) with Baniyas along with Philostorgius, Theodoret, and Samuel ben Samson is given over to dispute. Eusebius of Caesarea locates Dan/Laish more accurately in the vicinity of Paneas at the fourth mile on the route to Tyre.

== Commemoration ==
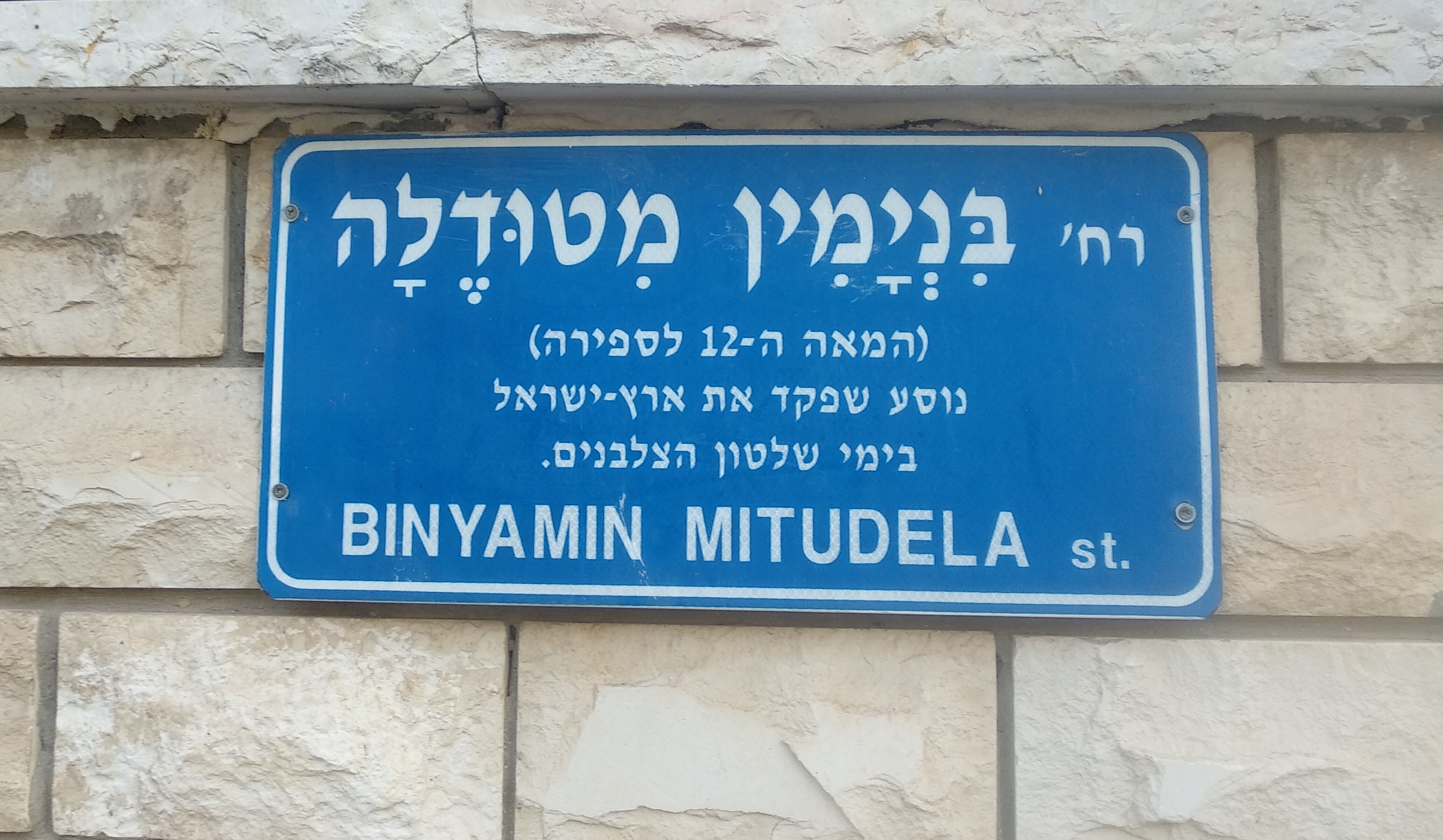
Binyamin Mitudela street, Tel Aviv

The name Benjamin of Tudela was adopted by a mid-19th-century traveler and author, known as Benjamin II.

One of the main works of Mendele Mocher Sforim, a major 19th-century Russian Jewish writer, is the 1878 Masoes Benyomen Hashlishi (מסעות בנימין השלישי) (The Wanderings of Benjamin III), which is considered something of a Jewish Don Quixote and whose title is clearly inspired by Benjamin of Tudela's book.

A street in Jerusalem's Rehavia neighborhood, Rehov Binyamin Mitudela (רחוב בנימין מטודלה), is named after him, as is a street in Tel Aviv and another one in the former Jewish Quarter of his hometown Tudela. A high-school in his hometown is named Benjamín de Tudela after him too.

The well-known Israeli poet Nathan Alterman wrote a poem about Benjamin of Tudela, which was set to music by Naomi Shemer and was often heard on the Israeli radio.

Uri Shulevitz wrote and illustrated The Travels of Benjamin of Tudela: Through Three Continents in the Twelfth Century in 2005.

== Translations of his work ==
- Benjamin of Tudela. The Itinerary of Benjamin of Tudela: Travels in the Middle Ages. Trans. Marcus Nathan Adler. Introductions by Michael A. Signer, Marcus Nathan Adler, and A. Asher. Published by Joseph Simon/Pangloss Press, 1993. ISBN 0-934710-07-4
- The Itinerary of Benjamin of Tudela. trans. Marcus Nathan Adler. 1907: includes map of route (p. 2) and commentary. PDF format.
- The Itinerary of Benjamin of Tudela: Critical Text, Translation and Commentary Nathan Marcus Adler (trans., ed., New York: Phillip Feldheim, Inc., 1907), reprint by Hebrew University – Department of History of Israel, 1960. Text document, accessed July 2020.
- Works by Benjamin of Tudela at Project Gutenberg
- Sefer Masaot Benjamin MiTudela, Trilingual edition in Basque, Spanish and Hebrew published in Pamplona, 1994 by the Government of Navarra. Xabier Kintana translated Sefer Masaot into Basque language and Jose Ramon Magdalena Nom de Deu translated into Spanish. This trilingual special edition of Benjamin MiTudela book has an introduction by the president of Navarra, Juan Cruz Alli Aranguren ISBN 9788423512867
- Tudelalı Benjamin ve Ratisbonlu Petachia, Ortaçağ’da İki Yahudi Seyyahın Avrupa, Asya ve Afrika Gözlemleri [trans. by Nuh Arslantas, from Marmara University, Istanbul Kaknüs: İstanbul 2001 ISBN 975-6698-21-7 (Second ed. M.Ü. İlahiyat Fakültesi Vakfı Yayınları: İstanbul 2009 ISBN 978-975-548-227-9

== See also ==
- Ibrahim ibn Yaqub
- Ibn Battuta
- Exploration of Asia
