= Symphony No. 2 (Kabalevsky) =

Dmitry Kabalevsky's Symphony No. 2 in C minor, Op. 19, written in 1934, is the second of the four symphonies he wrote and the most performed and recorded of the cycle, probably owing to its sense of drama, bright orchestration and expressive straightforwardness, ranging from melancholy to jubilance. With a dramatic and agitated yet extroverted, lyrical and fairly positive outlook, like other dramatic Russian symphonies from the Stalinist era it was alleged to deal with the struggle of mankind to reform society within Soviet values.

The symphony was premiered on December 25, 1934 in the Moscow Conservatory's Large Hall by the Moscow Philharmonic under Albert Coates. The international première was carried out (and recorded) in New York City on November 8, 1942 by the NBC Orchestra conducted by Arturo Toscanini, and it was well received, according to Olin Downes' review for the New York Times. Toscanini, who championed the overture from Kabalevsky's opera Colas Breugnon, would play it again in 1945.

== Movements ==
There are three movements:

1. Allegro quasi presto
2. Andante non troppo
3. Prestissimo scherzando

== Discography ==
Orchestra	Conductor	Location	Year	Label(s)	Duration
NBC Symphony	Arturo Toscanini	(United States) Radio City, New York	1942	Melodiya, Pristine	23:21
Accademia di Santa Cecilia Orchestra	Jacques Rachmilovich	(Italy) Teatro Argentina, Rome	1949	Capitol, Naxos	21:20
Moscow Radio Symphony	Nikolai Anosov		1953	Melodiya, Monarch	24:18
New Philharmonia	David Measham	(United Kingdom) St Giles-without-Cripplegate, London	1973	HNH, Unicorn	23:51
Szeged Symphony	Ervin Acél		1977	Olympia	27:34
Plovdiv Philharmonic	Dimiter Manolov		1991	Balkanton	
Armenian Philharmonic	Loris Tjeknavorian	(Armenia) Aram Khachaturian Hall, Yerevan	1997	ASV	26:53
NDR Radiophilharmonie	Eiji Oue	(Germany) Landesfunkhaus Niedersachsen, Hanover	2001/02	CPO	25:37
BBC Philharmonic	Neeme Järvi	(United Kingdom) New Broadcasting House, Manchester	2006	Chandos	24:11
Malmö Symphony	Darrell Ang	(Sweden) Malmö Live, Malmö	2017	Naxos	23:21
