= Tony Huber =

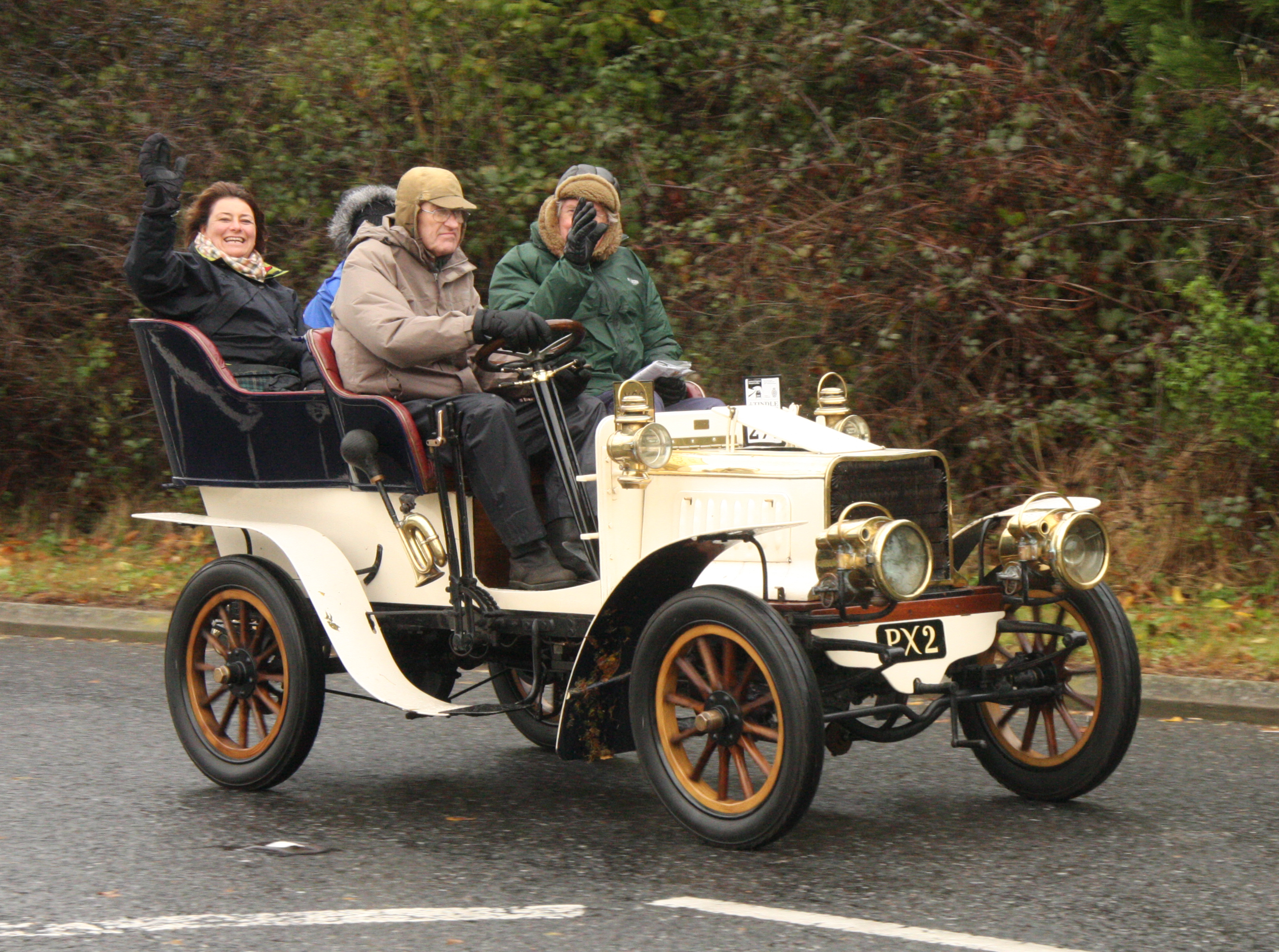
1903 Tony Huber on London to Brighton run

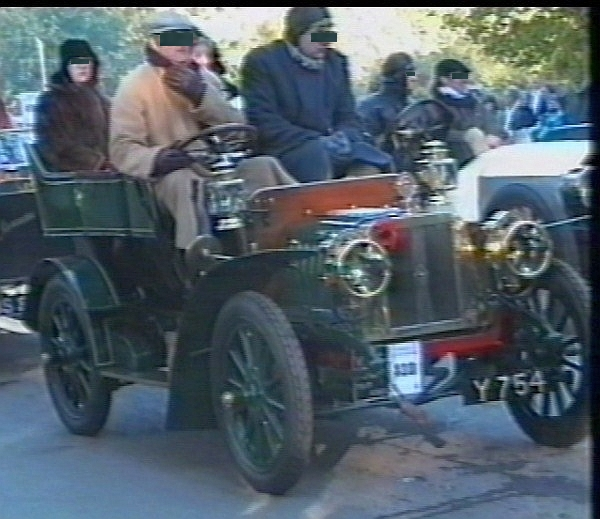
1904 Tony Huber

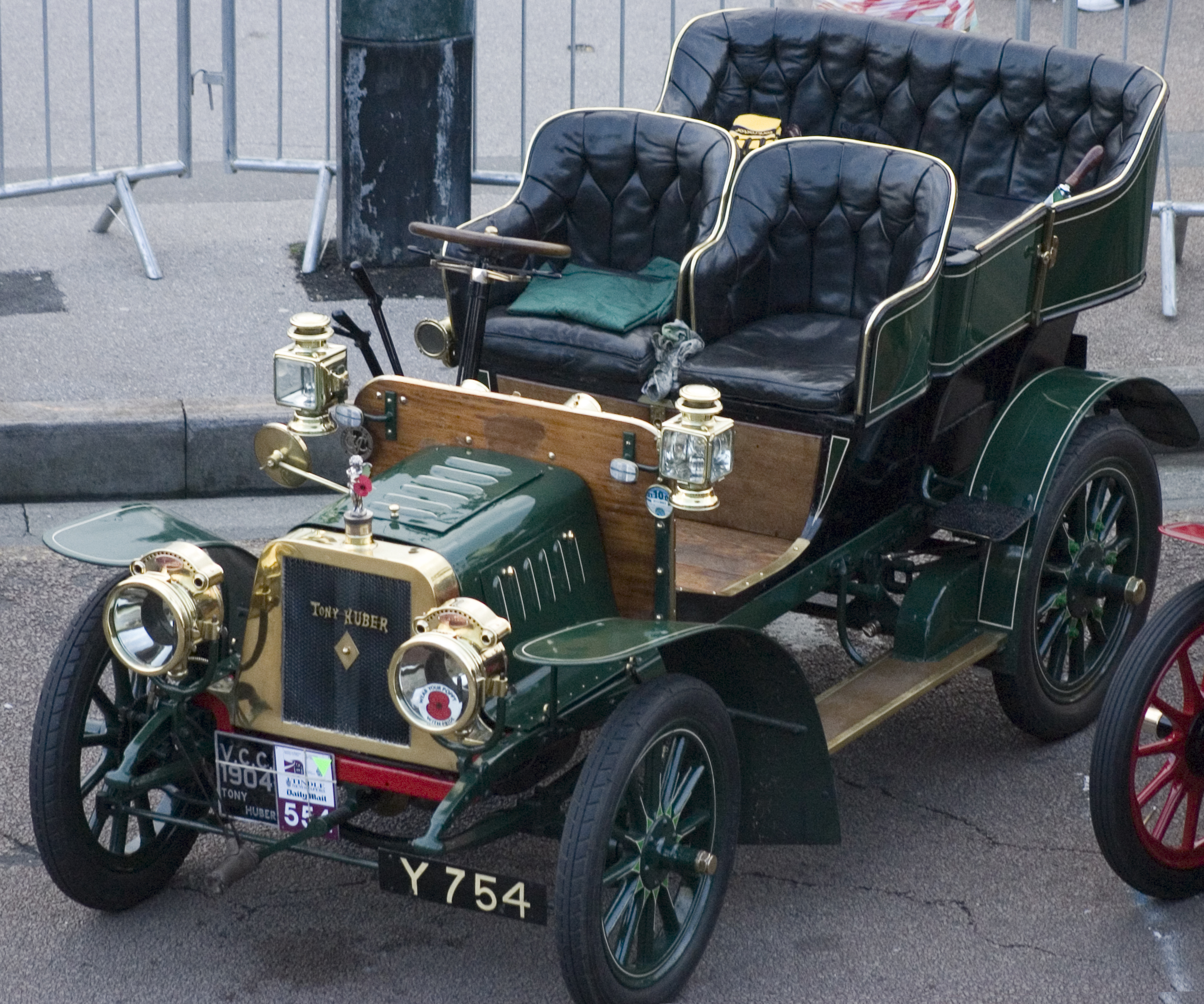
Tony Huber 1904 Tonneau

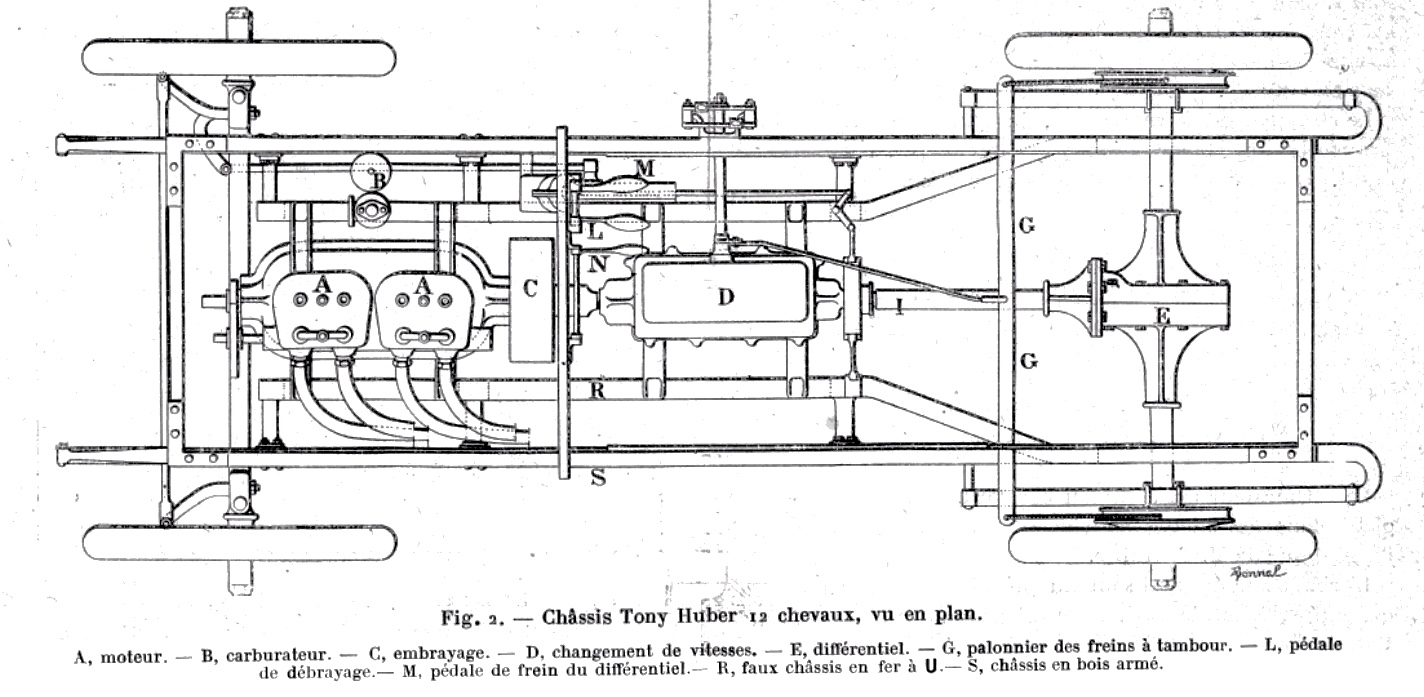
Tony Huber Chassis (1902)

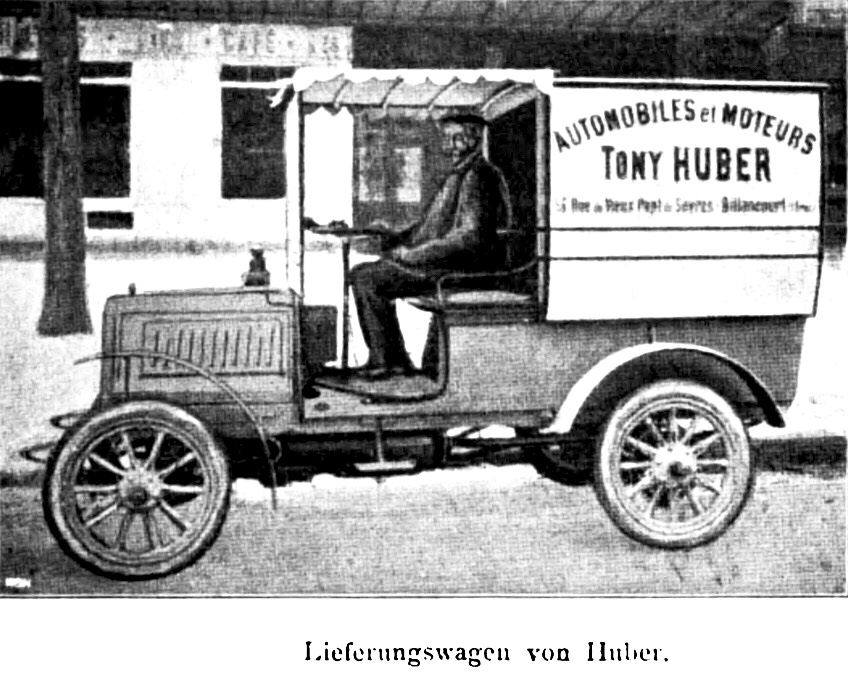
Tony Huber camionnette (1902)

Automobiles Tony Huber, Tony Huber was a French manufacturer of automobiles in Paris from 1902 until 1906.

== Company history ==
Tony Huber founded his automobile production company in Boulogne-Billancourt in 1902. The brand name was Tony Huber. In addition to manufacturing their own automobiles, engines were also supplied to other automobile manufacturers. Production ended in 1906.

The UK agent was 'United Motor Industries' of London and Rue Meyerbeer, Paris, founded in 1899.

Between 1905 and 1912, Huber operated a company with Armand Peugeot for the production of motor boats and electrical systems.

From 1920, Huber again manufactured motor boats in the new company Tony Huber et Compagnie.

== Vehicles ==
Two models with two-cylinder engines were offered, having engines of either 8 HP or 11 HP. The latter model had a chain drive, all other models had a shaft drive. There were also four-cylinder models with 14CV, 16/18CV and 20/25CV.

Two vehicles of this brand still exist and occasionally take part in the London to Brighton Veteran Car Run.

== Engine supplier ==
Tony Huber supplied their engines as original equipment for : Alliance, Bolide, Crypto, C.V.R., Medici and Morisse.
