= C.V.R. (automobile) =

C.V.R., Automobiles C.V.R. was a manufacturer of automobiles in Paris, France, from 1906 until 1907. It was founded when Automobiles Couverchel moved the business from Neuilly-sur-Seine to Boulogne-Billancourt.

== Company history ==
C.V.R., of Boulogne-Billancourt, was the direct successor to Automobiles Couverchel from Neuilly-sur-Seine. Automobile production began in 1906 and ended in 1907. The brand name was CVR.

== Vehicles ==
The company manufactured six different models ranging from the 12/16 CV with four-cylinder engine to the 40/50 CV with six-cylinder engine. The vehicles were equipped with engines from Peugeot, or Mutel of Paris, or Tony Huber of Paris. All vehicles used a four-speed transmission and shaft drive.
