= Bochur =

Young student of Talmud

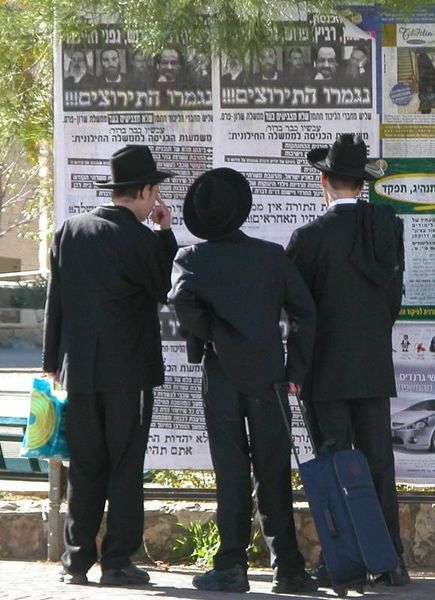
Bochurim in Jerusalem, 2005

Bochur (Hebrew: בחור, plural: bochurim Hebrew: בחורים) (Note: spelling variants: bahur, bachur, bochur, bocher, bokher; plural: bahurim, bachurim, bochurim, bocherim, bokherem, bochrim) literally means "young man" in Hebrew. Historically, among the Ashkenazi Jews "bochurim" (specifically "yeshiva bochurim", Hebrew: ישיבֿה בחורים) came to denote young bachelor men who studied Talmud. Due to the 14th century calamities for the Jews in Europe, including pogroms and other persecutions associated with the Black Death, the prosperity in Jewish communities dwindled and many families could not afford to pay for (religious) education. At the same time many Jewish educational establishments were closed or could not to afford accept many students. This contributed to the emergence of the phenomenon of itinerant bochurim who traveled across the Europe with temporary stops at places where they could get a piece of education, supported by local Jewish communities, see "Essen teg".
