= Benjamin Zuskin =

Jewish actor

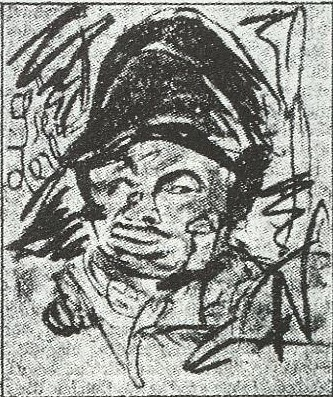
Arno Nadel: Zuskin as Sender in The Dybbuk

Benjamin Zuskin (Russian: Вениамин Львович Зу́скин (Veniamin Lvovich Zuskin); April 28, 1899 – August 12, 1952) was a Soviet and Russian actor and director of the Moscow State Jewish Theatre (GOSET). Zuskin had the title of People's Artist of the RSFSR.

== Biography ==
Zuskin was born in April 1899 in the town of Ponevezh (Panevėžys), in the then Kovno Governorate of the Russian Empire, today Lithuania, a son of a tailor. He attended a cheder. Zuskin was admitted into real school in 1911. Following the April 1915 defeat of a Russian army at the hands of the German army, the Russian authorities ordered the mass deportation of Jews living in central Lithuania to the interior of Russia — approximately 250,000 were expelled. The Zuskin family went to Penza on the European side of the Urals. There he met and married the daughter of another deported family, Rachel Holand (in Russian, Goland). In Penza, Benjamin continued his studies and took roles in a local theatre. In 1920 he became a student of Sverdlovsk Geological Institute, but in 1921 asked for transfer to Moscow Geological Institute. In that year, a daughter, Tamara, was born in Moscow. Shortly afterward, however, Benjamin and Rachel separated, and Rachel and Tamara moved to Rachel's home town, Vilkomir (Ukmergė), Lithuania, and soon thereafter to Kovno (Kaunas), the temporary capital of Lithuania. Tamara rejoined her father in Moscow in 1935 and enrolled in medical school there. (Rachel, her second husband, and their three children remained in Kaunas. All but one daughter were killed in the Kovno Ghetto, the urban concentration camp established by Nazi Germany and their Lithuanian collaborators in the Viliampolė / Slobodke neighborhood of Kaunas.) Benjamin remarried in 1935 and had another daughter, Alla. His second wife died in 1937.

== Theatre career ==
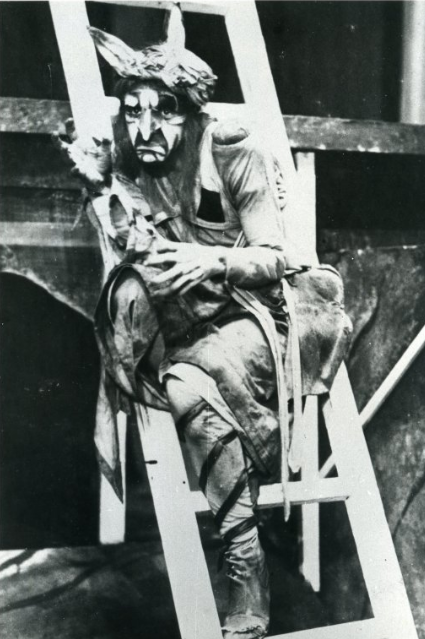
Benjamin Zuskin as the sorceress, GOSET, 1922

Zuskin joined the Moscow State Jewish Theater in 1921. In the same year Zuskin, together with Solomon Mikhoels, brought to the stage a set of one-act plays by Sholem Aleichem presented together under the title "Sholem Aleichem Evening". In 1922 he played the title role in The Sorceress by Abraham Goldfaden.

Zuskin's performance blended with Alexis Granowsky's system of organic interrelation of a word and gesture, plastics and rhythm of movements. His characteristic features were light humor and romanticism which gave additional tints to a controversial life of Jewish hamlet of shtetl. His roles showed to the audience a quarry of talented people among their routine activities. His most famous role was that of the Fool in the 1935 production of King Lear, with Solomon Mikhoels in the title role.

Zuskin was a partner of Mikhoels until the latter's suspicious death in car accident in Minsk, in January 1948 when Zuskin became the artistic director of the theater. Since 1935 he was also teaching at the actors' studio at the theater.

== Filmography ==
Zuskin was a featured actor of Soviet movies.

- A Man from a Shtetl (1930)
- Seekers of Happiness (1936) as Pinya Kopman
- The Unvanquished (1945) as Dr. Aron

== Execution ==
As a prominent member of the Jewish Anti-Fascist Committee, he was arrested at a hospital while being treated for nervous exhaustion. He was suffering from depression and was put to sleep by pharmacological means, which was popular method for treating depression back then. The MGB took him from the hospital while he was asleep. He awoke in a cell at Moscow's Lubyanka prison. Zuskin was later executed on Joseph Stalin's orders in the event known as the Night of the Murdered Poets on August 12, 1952.

== See also ==
- History of the Jews in Russia
- Yiddish theatre
