= Alliance (1905 automobile) =

Short-lived French automobile

The Alliance was a short-lived French automobile manufactured in Paris from 1905 to 1908. Also known as the Aiglon, the marque had a similar radiator to that used on the Mass. The company listed an 18 hp four with Tony Huber engine in 1908; this car sold in England for £450.
