= Piano Concerto No. 2 (Kabalevsky) =

The Piano Concerto No. 2 in G minor, Op. 23 by Dmitry Kabalevsky was composed in 1935 (just a few years after he joined the faculty of the Moscow Conservatory) and then revised in 1973. Its first performance was given in Moscow on May 12, 1936, and consists of three movements:

1. Allegro moderato
2. Andantino semplice
3. Allegro molto
