= Essen teg =

Practice of Jewish community to feed Talmud students

Essen teg or esn teg (Yiddish: עסן טעג, literally "Eating Days") was a practice of community boarding of Talmud students who came from remote places to study at a beit midrash. Families invited students to their homes to share the main meal with them on a certain day of a week on a regular basis. A student would try to arrange his essen teg for all days of the week with different families.

This tradition was extended to yeshiva students, since many yeshivas in Eastern Europe didn't have enough funds to feed their students.

The Jewish community has a long practice of hospitality, which included pletten ("meal tickets") issued to the travelling visitors of a community known since the Middle Ages. The Jewish Encyclopedia (1902-1908) says: "This custom of feeding the bahurim by billeting them daily upon the members of the community originated in Poland and spread to Germany. Through the influence of Elijah Wilna the system was abolished in most Lithuanian yeshibot, and today it is to be found only in certain towns where a few bahurim dwell".

The system had its advantages: it was easy to administer: students or a gabbai made arrangements; there was no need to collect and disburse funds, no need to maintain facilities. It also created opportunities for hosts: to earn a divine reward, to gain prestige by demonstrating charity, to have a good company, and in some cases to arrange a marriage for a daughter. At the same time it was criticized for being demeaning to the students and in poor communities there was a resentment for being forced to share their meager meals.

In some cases an exchange was arranged: it was customary to send boys for study in some other place, and a family who boarded a student would send their own son to the native place of the visitor to board with the parent of the visitor.

The story Eating Days by Lamed Shapiro tells an experience of a poor yeshiva student; in particular it details his weekly schedule of essen teg.

== See also ==
- Homestay
