= The Travels of Benjamin III =

The Travels of Benjamin III (מסעות בנימין השלישי, Masa'os Binyamin Ha-Shelishi) is a satirical work from the writer Mendele Mocher Sforim. The work was published first in the year 1878 in Yiddish, and, from then, until today, it has been considered by some to be the greatest satire on exilic Jewish life. The work is modeled after the Miguel de Cervantes novel Don Quixote.

The titular character is considered the third great Jewish Benjamin to be a traveler: the first being Benjamin of Tudela, and the second being J. J. Benjamin.
