= Aiglon (motorcycle) =

Brand of French motorcycles (1908–1953)

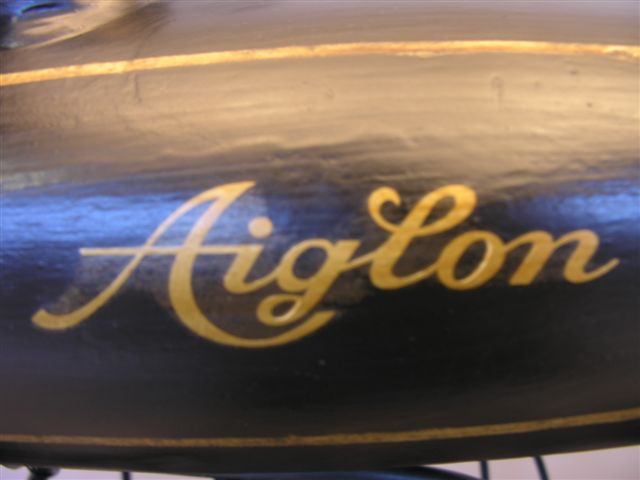
- Aiglon tank logo
- Production: 1908–1953
- Class: Motorcycle
- Engine: 123–500 cc

Aiglon ('Eaglet') was a brand of motorcycles made in France between 1908 and 1953, with engines ranging in size from 123 cc to 500 cc.
