= Piano Concerto No. 3 (Kabalevsky) =

The Piano Concerto No. 3 in D major, Op. 50 (subtitled Youth) by Russian composer Dmitri Kabalevsky is one of three concertos (the others are for violin and cello) written for and dedicated to young performers within the Soviet Union in 1952, and is sometimes performed as a student's first piano concerto. This sunny and tuneful piece manages to combine effective apparent pianistic pyrotechnics whilst keeping it within the range of ability of a keen student.

== Music ==
The piece has three movements:

1. Allegro molto
2. Andante con moto
3. Presto

The opening movement begins with a dramatic trumpet fanfare, followed by swirling piano writing that has a touch of the great piano concertos of Tchaikovsky and Rachmaninov. There is a central dramatic cadenza before the opening theme returns, the movement ending with the same short fanfare.

The second movement begins in G minor in a far more austere style, using pizzicato string notes over which a melody is played in octaves on the piano. There is a shimmering central section at a faster tempo that moves through various major keys before the opening minor theme is restated, but this time with a forte from the full orchestra. The opening quiet atmosphere eventually returns at the end of this movement.

The final movement starts at breakneck speed, which is only briefly interrupted in the middle by a little march. Just before the end a sweeping romantic melody first heard in the first movement is played at full volume before the concerto ends with a prestissimo coda.

The work shares themes in common with Kabalevsky's Rhapsody for Piano and Orchestra, op.75, on the theme of the song "School Years".
