= Piano Concerto No. 1 (Kabalevsky) =

The Piano Concerto No. 1 in A minor, Op. 9 by Dmitry Kabalevsky was written in 1928. Its first performance was given with the composer himself as pianist in Moscow on December 11, 1931. The concerto consists of three movements:

1. Moderato quasi andantino
2. Moderato - Allegro assai
3. Vivace marcato
