= The Comedians (Kabalevsky) =

Orchestral suite by Dmitry Kabalevsky

The Comedians, Op. 26, is an orchestral suite of ten numbers by Dmitry Kabalevsky. It is one of his best-known and best-loved works.

In particular, the "Comedians' Galop" (No. 2) is the single most famous piece of music he ever wrote. It is popular as a piece played on sports days in Japan.

== Background ==
In 1938 or 1939, Kabalevsky wrote incidental music for a children's play called The Inventor and the Comedians, by the Soviet writer Mark Daniel. The play was about the German inventor Johannes Gutenberg and a group of travelling buffoons; it was staged at the Central Children's Theatre in Moscow. Mark Daniel died young the following year.

== Concert suite ==
In 1940, Kabalevsky chose ten short numbers from the incidental music and arranged them into a concert suite. The movements are:

- Prologue: Allegro vivace
- Comedians' Galop: Presto
- March: Moderato
- Waltz: Moderato
- Pantomime: Sostenuto e pesante
- Intermezzo: Allegro scherzando
- Little Lyrical Scene: Andantino semplice
- Gavotte: Allegretto
- Scherzo: Presto assai e molto leggiero
- Epilogue: Allegro molto e con brio.

The Comedians has been frequently recorded.

The "Galop" was used as the theme tune for the U.S. panel game show Masquerade Party for many years.
