= Orlyonok (disambiguation) =

Orlyonok (Russian: Орлёнок, lit. 'eaglet') is a Russian kids camp.

Orlyonok or Orlenok may also refer to:

- A-90 Orlyonok, Russian ekranoplan
- Orlyonok (game), a Soviet mass war game for children
- Orlyonok (film), a 1957 Soviet film
- Orlyonok, a bicycle model by Vairas
- HMS Orlionoch
- 2188 Orlenok, minor planet
