= Colas Breugnon (opera) =

Colas Breugnon (Russian: Кола́ Брюньо́н, Kola Bryun'on), Op. 24, also known as The Master-Craftsman of Clamecy (Мастер из Кламси́, Master iz Klamsi), is a Russian-language opera in three acts with prologue by Dmitry Kabalevsky. The libretto by Vladimir Bragin is based on Romain Rolland's novel about a fictional Burgundian optimist named Colas Breugnon set in 16th-century Clamecy, Nièvre. The opera premiered at the Leningrad State Academic Maly Opera Theatre under the direction of Samuil Samosud on February 22, 1938. In 1968, the composer prepared a second version of the opera, Op. 90, which premiered on April 16, 1970. The opera is best known for its "rollicking" overture.

== Roles ==
Russian	English	Voice type	Premiere Cast, 1938 (Conductor: Samuil Samosud)
Кола Брюньон	Colas Breugnon	baritone	
Селина (по прозвищу Ласочка)	Selina (nicknamed Lasochka)	mezzo-soprano	
Жаклина	Jacqueline	soprano	
Жифляр	Jean Gifflard	high bass	
Кюре Шамай	Curé Chamaille	bass	
Робине	Robinet	tenor	
Герцог д’Ануа	Duke d'Asnois	tenor	
Мадемуазель де Терм	Mademoiselle de Termes	soprano	
Глашатай	A herold	tenor	
1-й прихожанин	1st parishioner	tenor	
2-й прихожанин	2nd parishioner	bass	
Глоди, виучка Брюньона 4-5 лет	Glodie, Breugnon's ward, 4-5 years old	silent	
Два голоса за сценой	2 children's voices behind the scene (high, low)		
Кламсийцы, гости герцога, солдаты	People of Clamecy, Guests of the Duke, Soldiers		
