= The Eaglet (1913 film) =

- Directed by: Emile Chautard
- Written by: Edmond Rostand (play)
- Production company: Société Française des Films Éclair
- Release date: 1913
- Country: France
- Languages: Silent; French

The Eaglet (French:L'aiglon) is a 1913 French silent historical film directed by Emile Chautard. It is an adaptation of the play L'Aiglon by Edmond Rostand, which portrays the life of Napoleon II.

== Cast ==
- Pépa Bonafé
- Emile Chautard as Napoleon Bonaparte
- Marie-Louise Derval
- Maxime Desjardins
- Catherine Fonteney
- Philippe Garnier
- Paul Guidé
- Jacques Guilhène
- Emmy Lynn
- Maxime Léry
- Jules Mondos
- Louis Ravet
- Henry Roussel

== Bibliography ==
- Abel, Richard. The Ciné Goes to Town: French Cinema, 1896-1914. University of California Press, 1998.
