= Dmitry Kabalevsky =

Russian composer (1904–1987)

- Дмитрий Кабалевский
- Kabalevsky c. 1940
- Born: 17 December [O.S. 30 December] 1904; Moscow, Russian Empire
- Died: February 14, 1987 (aged 82); Moscow
- Resting place: Novodevichy Cemetery
- Education: Academic Music College; Moscow Conservatory
- Known for: Composer, conductor, pianist, pedagogue

Dmitry Borisovich Kabalevsky (Russian: Дми́трий Бори́сович Кабале́вский; 30 December [O.S. 17 December] 1904 – 14 February 1987) was a Soviet composer, conductor, pianist and pedagogue of Russian gentry descent.

He helped set up the Union of Soviet Composers in Moscow and remained one of its leading figures during his lifetime. He was a prolific composer of piano music and chamber music; many of his piano works were performed by Vladimir Horowitz. He is best known in Western Europe for his Second Symphony; the "Comedians' Galop" from The Comedians Suite, Op. 26; and his Third Piano Concerto.

== Life ==
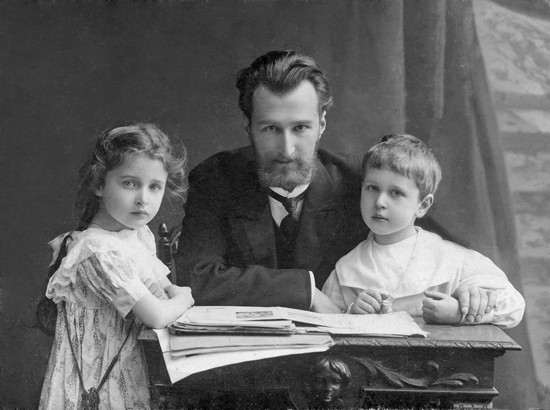
Boris Klavdievich Kabalevsky and his son Dmitry and daughter Elena. St. Petersburg, 1909.

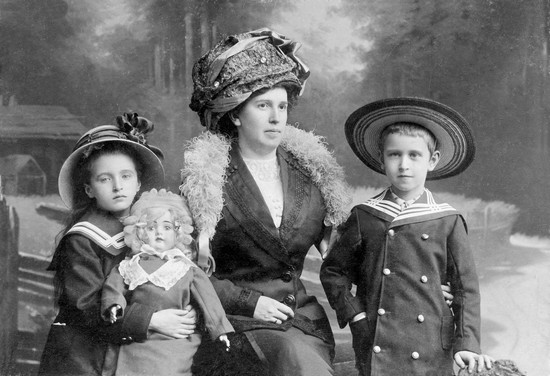
Nadezhda Kabalevskaya (née Nowicka) and her son Dmitry and daughter Elena. St. Petersburg, 1911.

Kabalevsky was born in Saint Petersburg in 1904, but moved to Moscow at a young age. His father was a mathematician and encouraged him to study mathematics, but he showed a fascination for the arts. He studied at the Academic Music College in Moscow and graduated in 1922. He then continued his studies with Vasily Selivanov. In 1925, he then went on to study at the Moscow Conservatory where he learned composition with first Georgy Catoire, then Nikolai Myaskovsky and piano with Aleksandr Goldenweiser. By the age of 26 his list of compositions included the String Quartet, Op. 8, Piano Concerto, Op. 9, Eight Children's Songs, Op. 17, and various works for solo piano. In 1925 he joined PROKULL (Production Collective of Student Composers), a student group affiliated with Moscow Conservatory aimed at bridging the gap between the modernism of the ACM and the utilitarian "agitprop" music of the RAPM. (add cit.) In 1932 he was appointed senior lecturer at the Moscow Conservatory and by 1939 was a full-time professor. He also worked as a music critic for the All-Union Radio and as an editor for the Sovetskaya muzïka and the publisher Muzgiz.

Kabalevsky was a prolific composer in many musical forms; he wrote symphonies, concertos, operas, ballets, chamber works, songs, theatre, film scores, pieces for children and some pieces for the proletariat. During the 1930s he wrote music for the emerging genre of films with sound. (Shostakovich and Prokofiev also wrote music for this genre.) Some of his film music became recognized in its own right. However, his biggest contribution to the world of music-making was his consistent effort to connect children to music. During 1925–1926 he worked as a piano teacher in a government school and was struck by the lack of proper material for helping children to learn music. He set out to write easy pieces that would allow children to conquer technical difficulties and to form their taste. His music focused on bridging the gap between children's technical skills and adult aesthetics. He also wrote a book on the subject, which was published in the United States in 1988 as Music and Education: A Composer Writes about Musical Education.

He joined the Communist Party in 1940 and received the Medal of Honour from the Soviet government for his musical skill in 1941. In 1948, when Andrei Zhdanov issued his resolution on the directions and changes for Soviet music, Kabalevsky was originally on the list of composers who were allegedly the most guilty of "formalism", but due to his connections within official circles, Kabalevsky's name was removed. Another theory states that Kabalevsky's name was only on the list because of his position in the leadership of the Union of Soviet Composers.

His traditional stance as a composer, combined with his strong sense of civic duty expressed in his educational work, endeared him to the Soviet regime and earned him a long list of honours and awards, including the Lenin Prize in 1972 and the Hero of Socialist Labour in 1974. This is a testament to his ability to work creatively in the same conditions in which so many of his contemporary composers had difficulties.

In general, Kabalevsky was not as adventurous as his contemporaries in terms of harmony and preferred a more conventional diatonicism, interlaced with chromaticism and major-minor interplay. The important role played by the subdominant and the frequent juxtaposition of thirds in Kabalevsky's works are features common to many Russian composers. His use of form is mostly conventional as he preferred symmetrical rondo or variation structures.

Unlike fellow composer Sergei Prokofiev, Kabalevsky embraced the ideas of socialist realism, and his post-war works have been characterized as "popular, bland, and successful," though this judgement has been applied to many other composers of the time. Some of Kabalevsky's best-known "youth works" date from this era, such as the Violin Concerto and the First Cello Concerto. Kabalevsky wrote for all musical genres and was consistently faithful to the ideals of socialist realism. Kabalevsky frequently travelled overseas; he was a member of the Soviet Committee for the Defense of Peace as well as a representative for the promotion of friendship between the Soviet Union and foreign countries.

In 1961, Kabalevsky made a recording of his Overture Pathetique, Spring, and Songs of Morning, in which he conducted. It was released in the U.S. in 1975 on the Westminster Gold label.

Also in 1961, Kabalevsky orchestrated Franz Schubert's well known Fantasia in F minor, originally written for four hands on one piano, producing a virtuoso piece for a piano soloist playing with a symphony orchestra. This work has been recorded several times.

He was awarded a number of state honours for his musical works, including those given by the Soviet government. In regards to his teaching, he was elected the head of the Commission of Musical Aesthetic Education of Children in 1962, and was also elected president of the Scientific Council of Educational Aesthetics in the Academy of Pedagogical Sciences of the USSR in 1969. Kabalevsky also received the honorary degree of the president of the International Society of Musical Education.

His notable students included Leo Smit.

He died in Moscow on 14 February 1987.

== Legacy ==
According to musicologist Marina Raku, "Through verbal commentaries on music the Soviet ideology ‘appropriated’ the classical musical heritage." In 1924, Maxim Gorky said that Soviet leader Vladimir Lenin was a quasi-religious admirer of Issay Dobrowen's performance of the "preterhuman music" of one of Beethoven's 32 sonatas. Kabalevsky successfully developed and promoted that "quasi-religious" system and attitude towards musical education. The system included, at one stage, thousands of free, state-sponsored regional children's musical schools that offered an 8-year course promoting musical literacy and appreciation but not professional musicianship. The next stage included dozens of music schools training teachers for the previous stage, and conservatories training world-class performers. Classical music performers, like ballet dancers, were household names through their frequent appearances on Soviet TV. Kabalevsky's oft-quoted credo was "Beauty Evokes Kindness" (Russian: Прекрасное пробуждает доброе, romanized: Prekrasnoe probuzhdaet dobroe). The system was criticised for its alleged psychological violence towards the youth, e.g., threats that violin students would "be raped by the bow" unless they practice enough, and for being a "tortuous tool for the gender socialization of girls." After 1991, music teachers' salaries, said to be "microscopic", were below the living wage in Russia.

After the dissolution of the Soviet Union, the conservatories were "abandoned by the state to face the merciless fate". His idea to implement his system of musical education in secondary schools was abandoned long before the clericalization of Russian society. As of 2015, 3,089 children's musical schools and arts schools with music departments survived in Russia.

== Honours and awards ==
- People's Artist of the RSFSR (1954).
- People's Artist of the USSR (1963).
- Hero of Socialist Labour (1974).
- Four Orders of Lenin (1964, 1971, 1974, 1984)
- Order of the Red Banner of Labour (1966)
- Order of the Badge of Honour (1940)
- Lenin Prize (1972) – a new version of the opera "Colas Breugnon" (1968)
- Stalin Prizes

first degree (1946) – for the String Quartet No. 2 in G minor Op. 44 (1945)
second degree (1949) – Concerto for Violin and Orchestra (1948)
second degree – for the opera "Taras Family" (1950)

- USSR State Prize (1980) – for the 4th Concerto for Piano and Orchestra ("Prague") (1979)
- Glinka State Prize of the RSFSR (1966) – for "Requiem" for soloists, two choirs and orchestra (1962)
- Lenin Komsomol Prize (1984)

== Selected filmography ==
- A Petersburg Night (1934)
- Aerograd (1935)
- Dawn of Paris (1936)
- Shchors (1939)
- Anton Ivanovich Is Angry (1941)
- First-Year Student (1948)
- Ivan Pavlov (1949)
- Mussorgsky (1950)
- Hostile Whirlwinds (1953)
- The Sisters (1957)

== Works ==
- See List of compositions by Dmitry Kabalevsky

== Sources ==
- Anon. "Obituary: Dmitry Kabalevsky". The Musical Times 128, no. 1731 (May 1987): 287.
- Abraham, Gerald. 1944. Eight Soviet Composers. Great Britain: Oxford University Press. pp. 70–73.
- Leonard, Richard Anthony. 1957. A History of Russian Music. New York: The MacMillan Company. pp. 354–355.
- Daragan, Dina Grigor'yevna. 2001. "Kabalevsky, Dmitry Borisovich", The New Grove Dictionary of Music and Musicians edited by S. Sadie and J. Tyrrell. London: Macmillan. Also in Grove Music Online , ed. L. Macy (accessed 23 October 2007) (Subscription Access)
- Schwarz, Boris. 1983. Music and Musical Life in Soviet Russia, enlarged edition 1917–1981. Bloomington: Indiana University Press. ISBN 0-253-33956-1
- Maes, Francis. 2002. A History of Russian Music: From Kamarinskaya to Babi Yar. Translated by Arnold J. Pomerans and Erica Pomerans. Berkeley: University of California Press. ISBN 0-520-21815-9
