= Eagle (disambiguation) =

The eagle is a large bird of prey.

Eagle or The Eagle may also refer to:

== Places ==
=== China ===
- The Eagle (sinkhole), in Guangxi

=== England ===
- Eagle, Lincolnshire, a village

=== United States ===
- Eagle, Alaska, a city
- Eagle Village, Alaska, a census-designated place
- Eagle, Colorado, a statutory town
- Eagle, Idaho, a city
- Eagle, Illinois, an unincorporated community
- Eagle, Michigan, a village
- Eagle, Nebraska, a village
- Eagle, New Jersey, a ghost town
- Eagle, New York, a town
- Eagle, Pennsylvania, an unincorporated community
- Eagle, West Virginia, an unincorporated community
- Eagle, Wisconsin, a village
- Eagle (town), Wisconsin
- Eagle, Richland County, Wisconsin, a town
- Eagle Township (disambiguation)

=== Multiple countries ===
- Eagle Creek (disambiguation)
- Eagle Island (disambiguation)
- Eagle Lake (disambiguation)
- Eagle Pass (disambiguation)
- Eagle River (disambiguation)

=== Outer space ===
- Eagle Nebula
- Eagle (crater), landing spot on Mars of the rover Opportunity

== Arts and entertainment ==
=== Films ===
- The Eagle (1918 film), directed by Elmer Clifton
- The Eagle (1925 film), a silent film starring Rudolph Valentino
- The Eagle (1959 film), a Polish film
- Eagle (1990 film), a Croatian film
- The Eagle (2011 film), a British film starring Channing Tatum
- Eagle (2024 film), an Indian film

=== Music ===
- Eagle Records, a record label
- The Eagle Band, an American jazz band in New Orleans (1895–1929)
- Eagle, a rock band formed by former members of the Beacon Street Union
- The Eagle (album), 1990, by Waylon Jennings

=== Songs ===
- "Eagle" (ABBA song), 1977
- "The Eagle" (song), 1991, recorded by Waylon Jennings
- "Eagle", 2001, by Gotthard on Homerun
- "Eagle", 2016, by the Cat Empire on Rising with the Sun
- "Eagle" (D-Block Europe and Noizy song), 2024

=== Other arts and entertainment ===
- The Eagle (poem), written by Alfred, Lord Tennyson
- The Eagle (novel), the final book in Jack Whyte's Arthurian cycle
- Eagle (Middle-earth), the Great Eagles of J.R.R. Tolkien's Middle-earth
- Eagle (Calder), a 1971 abstract sculpture by Alexander Calder
- Eagle (British comics), a UK comic (1950–1969)
- Eagle (1982 comic), another UK comic (1982–1994)
- Eagle: The Making of an Asian-American President, a 1997 manga by Kaiji Kawaguchi
- The Eagle, hero of the six-issue American comic book series Red Menace
- The Eagle (TV series), a Danish crime series
- "The Eagle" (Veep), a 2016 television episode
- Eagle Transporter, a fictional vehicle from the Space: 1999 television series

== Businesses ==
- Eagle Broadcasting Corporation, a Philippine media company
- Eagle Electric, a former manufacturing company in Long Island City, New York, US
- Eagle Food Centers, a former chain of grocery stores
- Eagle Games, a board game publisher
- Eagle Inn, a pub in Salford, England
- Eagle Insurance, a vehicle insurance agency in Chicago, US
- Eagle Mobile, a former mobile communication company in Albania
- Eagle Pencil Company, now known as Berol
- Eagle Snacks, a brand name for snack food
- The Eagle at Weeton, a pub in Lancashire, England
- The Eagle (gay bars), a name shared by multiple gay bars
- The Eagle, Cambridge, a pub in England
- The Eagle Tavern, a London pub cited in Pop Goes the Weasel
- The Eagle, a pub in Clerkenwell, London, the original gastropub

== Computer software and hardware ==
- Eagle (application server), a CICS-to-Web development environment
- EAGLE (program), an electronic design automation software
- Eagle Computer, an early IBM-PC clone manufacturer
- Fujitsu Eagle, a model of disk drive popular in the 1980s
- Data General Eclipse MV/8000 (development codename EAGLE)
- Eagle, a deep packet inspection system

== In the military ==
- Fisher P-75 Eagle, a World War II US Army Air Forces fighter that was cancelled before production started
- McDonnell Douglas F-15 Eagle, a fighter aircraft
- AAM-N-10 Eagle, an American air-to-air missile
- Rolls-Royce Eagle, a V-12 aircraft engine of World War I
- Rolls-Royce Eagle XVI, an experimental aero engine developed in 1925
- Rolls-Royce Eagle (1944), an H-24 aircraft engine of the late 1940s
- HMS Eagle, various British Royal Navy ships
- USS Eagle, various US Navy ships
- Eagle-class patrol craft, a US Navy class
- Mowag Eagle, a reconnaissance vehicle
- Roman eagle, the standard of a legion
- French Imperial Eagle

== Publications ==
- The Eagle (newspaper), a list of daily newspapers
- The Eagle (magazine), the magazine of St. John's College, University of Cambridge
- The Eagle, the campus newspaper at American University
- Eagle (British comics), an illustrated comics paper for boys (1950-1994)

== People ==
- Eagle (surname), a list of people with the surname name
- Eagle of Delight (died 1822), emissary of the Otoe tribe
- Laxsgiik, the Eagle Clan of the Tsimshian First Nation of British Columbia, Canada
- Ed Belfour (born 1965), Canadian retired ice hockey player nicknamed "The Eagle"
- Eddie "The Eagle" Edwards (born 1963), British ski jumper
- Espen Bredesen (born 1968), Norwegian former ski jumper dubbed "Espen the Eagle"
- The Eagle, nickname of Anisur Rahman Zico (born 1997), Bangladeshi football goalkeeper
- The Eagle and American Eagle, and Jackie Fulton, ring names of American retired professional wrestler George Hines (born 1963)
- Starship Eagle, a ring name of Dan Spivey (born 1952), American retired professional wrestler
- The Eagle, nickname of Khabib Nurmagomedov (born 1988), Russian retired mixed martial artist

== Radio stations ==
- 96.4 Eagle Radio, a radio station in Guildford, England
- CFXL-FM, a classic and contemporary rock station in High River, Alberta, Canada
- CKCH-FM, a country station in Cape Breton, Nova Scotia, Canada
- CKUV-FM, a classic rock station in Okotoks, Alberta, Canada
- DWDM-FM, a classic hits and OPM radio station in Metro Manila, Philippines known as Eagle FM 95.5
- KEGK, a classic hits station in Fargo/Moorhead, Minnesota, US
- KEGL, a classic rock station in Dallas/Fort Worth, Texas, US
- KGLK, a classic rock station in Lake Jackson, Texas, US
- KKGL, a classic rock radio station in Boise, Idaho, US
- KLTH, a classic hits radio station in Lake Oswego, Oregon, US
- KNWN-FM, a classic rock radio station in Seattle, Washington, US
- WDGL, a classic rock station in Baton Rouge, Louisiana, US
- WTOB (AM), a radio station in Winston-Salem, North Carolina, US
- WWEG, a classic hits station in Myersville, Pennsylvania, US
- WXGL, a classic rock station in St. Petersburg, Florida, US

== Vehicles ==
=== Aircraft ===
- Airtrike Eagle 5, a German ultralight
- American Aerolights Eagle, an ultralight
- Buckeye Eagle, an American powered parachute
- Wills Wing Eagle, an American hang glider

=== Cars ===
- AMC Eagle, American Motors, from 1980 to 1987
- Eagle (automobile), Chrysler Corporation, from 1988 to 1998
- Eagle HF89, an IMSA Grand Touring Prototype built by All American Racers in 1989
- Eagle MkIII, an IMSA Grand Touring Prototype built by All American Racers in 1991
- North American Eagle Project, to attempt the land speed record
- Eagle Mk1, a 1960s Formula One car

=== Ships and boats ===
- HMS Eagle, various ships operated by the Royal Navy
- USCGC Eagle, various US Coast Guard ships
- MS Eagle, a ferry operated by Southern Ferries 1971 to 1975
- Eagle (yacht), a 12-metre class yacht
- Eagle (freighter), a 20th century freighter sunk to create an artificial reef
- Eagle (steamboat), a 1900 passenger steamboat
- Herreshoff Eagle, an American sailboat design
- PS Eagle
- PS Eagle III

=== Other vehicles ===
- Eagle Bus (1958–1993)
- Lunar Module Eagle, a spacecraft used in the Apollo 11 mission
- South Devon Railway Eagle class steam locomotive

== Other uses ==
- Eagle (golf), a score of two under par
- Eagle (English coin), a nickname for a 13th-century coin
- Eagle (heraldry), in a coat of arms
- EAGLE (organization), an NGO arresting traffickers in protected animals
- Eagle (United States coin), a $10 gold coin
- European Association for Grey Literature Exploitation, a bibliographic database producer
- Racehorse that fell in the 1848 Grand National
- The American School in London mascot
- Eagle (typeface)
- Bald eagle, sometimes referred to as simply "eagle" in the US

== See also ==
- Eagles (disambiguation)
- American Eagle Outfitters, a clothing brand
- Aquila (disambiguation) for the Latin word for Eagle
- Eagle Scout (disambiguation)
