= Eagle Lake =

Eagle Lake may refer to:

== Cities, towns, townships etc. ==
=== Canada ===
- Eagle Lake, Haliburton County, Ontario
- Eagle Lake, Parry Sound District, Ontario
- Eagle Lake 27, Ontario (Indian reserve)
- Eagle Lake, Kenora District, Ontario

=== United States ===
- Eagle Lake, Florida
- Eagle Lake, Illinois
- Eagle Lake, Maine, a New England town
  - Eagle Lake (CDP), Maine, the primary village in the town
- Eagle Lake, Minnesota
- Eagle Lake, Texas
- Eagle Lake, Wisconsin

== Lakes ==
=== Canada ===
- Eagle Lake (Alberta)
- Eagle Lake (British Columbia)
- Eagle Lake (Ontario)

=== United States ===
- Eagle Lake, Alaska, near Bell Island - see List of lakes of Alaska)
- Eagle Lake, in Bradley County, Arkansas
- Eagle Lake (Lassen County), 2nd largest natural lake entirely in California
- Eagle Lake (Desolation Wilderness), California
- Eagle Lake (Tulare County), near Mineral King, California
- Eagle Lake (Florida), on the west side of the town of Eagle Lake, Florida
- Eagle Lake (Maine), at the head of the Allagash Wilderness Waterway
- Eagle Lake (Fish River), one of the Maine Fish River chain of lakes
- Eagle Lake (Waterford Township, Michigan)
- Eagle Lake (Blue Earth County, Minnesota)
- Eagle Lake (Carlton County, Minnesota)
- Eagle Lake (Carver County, Minnesota)
- Eagle Lake, Cottonwood County, Minnesota
- Eagle Lake (Hubbard County, Minnesota)
- Eagle Lake, Martin County, Minnesota
- Eagle Lake, McLeod County, Minnesota
- Eagle Lake, Otter Tail County, Minnesota
- Eagle Lake (St. Louis County, Minnesota)
- Eagle Lake, Warren County, Mississippi
- Eagle Lake (New York)
- Eagle Lake (Oklahoma), Oklahoma County
- Eagle Lake, Texas, Colorado County

== See also ==
- Lacul Vulturilor (Romanian for "Eagles' lake"), a lake in Buzău County, Romania
- Eagle River (disambiguation)
- Eagle Creek (disambiguation)
- Eagle (disambiguation)
