= Eagle 5 =

Eagle 5 or Eagle V may refer to:

- Airtrike Eagle 5, an ultralight aircraft
- Eagle Mk 5, an open-wheeled open-cockpit CART/Indycar racecar manufactured by All American Racers
- Eagle V, a personal computer manufactured by Eagle Computer
- Eagle 5, the Winnebago spaceship driven by Cap. Lone Starr in the comedy sci-fi franchise Spaceballs
- A variation of the Mowag Eagle, a wheeled armored vehicle

== See also ==
- Eagle (disambiguation)
- Five (disambiguation)
