= Eagles (disambiguation) =

Eagles are large birds of prey.

Eagles may also refer to:

== Music ==
- Eagles (band), an American rock band formed in 1971
  - Eagles (album), the Eagles' debut album from 1972
  - Eagles (box set), a box set by the Eagles
- The Eagles (rhythm and blues group), a 1950s American vocal group
- The Eagles (British band), a British quartet

== Film and television ==
- Eagles (1984 film), an Iranian film
- Eagles (2012 film), an Israeli film
- Eagles (TV series), a 2019 Swedish television series

== Sports teams ==
=== American football teams ===
- Philadelphia Eagles, a National Football League team

=== Association football teams ===
- Bedford Town F.C., an English football team known as the Bedford Town Eagles
- Beşiktaş J.K., a Turkish football team based in Istanbul
- Crystal Palace F.C., an English football team based in South London known as the Eagles
- Eintracht Frankfurt, an association football team in Germany known as Die Adler (The Eagles)
- PFC Ludogorets Razgrad, a Bulgarian association football club
- S.L. Benfica, a Portuguese association football team
- S.S. Lazio, the Italian football association "Serie A" team
- The Eagles ("Die Adler"), a nickname for the Germany national football team
- Whitehead Eagles F.C., a football club in Northern Ireland

=== Australian rules football teams ===
- West Coast Eagles, an Australian Football League team
- Woodville-West Torrens Eagles, a South Australian National Football League team

=== Baseball teams ===
- Hanwha Eagles, a professional baseball team in South Korea
- Tohoku Rakuten Golden Eagles, a Japanese Pacific League baseball team

=== Basketball teams ===
- BCM U Pitești, a Romanian basketball team
- Newcastle Eagles, a British basketball team
- Qasioun Eagles, a nickname for the Syria national basketball team
- The Eagles ("Orły"), a nickname for the Poland men's national basketball team

=== Cricket teams ===
- Eagles cricket team, a South African cricket team based in Bloemfontein
- Eagles women's cricket team, a Zimbabwean cricket team based in Harare
- Mashonaland Eagles, a Zimbabwean cricket team based in Mashonaland

=== Hockey teams ===
- Colorado Eagles, an American Hockey League team located in Loveland, Colorado
- Surrey Eagles, a Tier II Junior "A" ice hockey team
- Washington Eagles, an Eastern Hockey League team that played from 1939 to 1942

=== Rugby teams ===
- Manly-Warringah Sea Eagles, an Australian rugby league football team
- Northern Eagles, an Australian former rugby league football club
- Northern Virginia Eagles, an American rugby league team
- Sheffield Eagles, a Rugby league team based in Sheffield, South Yorkshire
- SWD Eagles, a rugby club in South Africa
- Turku Eagles, a Finnish rugby union team
- The Eagles, a nickname for the United States men's national rugby union team
- The Women's Eagles, a nickname for the United States women's national rugby union team

=== Multi-sport teams ===
- American Eagles, the sports teams of American University, Washington, D.C.
- Ateneo Blue Eagles, the sports teams of Ateneo de Manila University in Quezon City, Philippines
- Boston College Eagles, the sports teams of Boston College
- Coppin State Eagles, the sports teams of Coppin State University
- Eastern Michigan Eagles, the sports teams of Eastern Michigan University
- Eastern Washington Eagles, the sports teams of Eastern Washington University
- Embry–Riddle Aeronautical University, an intercollegiate athletic conference team
- Florida Gulf Coast Eagles, the sports teams of Florida Gulf Coast University
- Georgia Southern Eagles, the sports teams of Georgia Southern University
- Marquette Golden Eagles, the sports teams of Marquette University
- Morehead State Eagles, the sports teams of Morehead State University
- Niagara Purple Eagles, the sports team of Niagara University
- North Carolina Central Eagles, the sports teams of North Carolina Central University
- North Texas Eagles, former name of the sports teams of the University of North Texas
- Oral Roberts Golden Eagles, the sports teams of Oral Roberts University
- P.A.O.K., a Greek multi-sport club known as the double-headed eagles
- Southern Miss Golden Eagles, the sports teams of Southern Mississippi University
- Tennessee Tech Golden Eagles, the sports teams of Tennessee Technological University
- Winthrop Eagles, the sports teams of Winthrop University
- UTM Eagles, the sports teams of the University of Toronto Mississauga

== Other uses ==
- Eagles (wargame), 1974 board wargame simulating the Roman campaign across the Rhine into Germania in 15 CE led by Germanicus
- Eagles (Squadron), a Pakistan Air Force squadron
- Eagles (surname)
- Eagles (card game), a collectible card game
- Fraternal Order of Eagles, a fraternal organization founded in 1898
- The American Eagles, later name for professional wrestling tag-team The Nightmares

== See also ==
- Eagle (disambiguation)
- Screaming Eagles (disambiguation)
