= Eagle Township, Kansas =

Eagle Township, Kansas may refer to the following places in Kansas:

- Eagle Township, Barber County, Kansas
- Eagle Township, Kingman County, Kansas

== See also ==
- List of Kansas townships
- Eagle Township (disambiguation)
