= Eagle Creek =

Eagle Creek may refer to:

== Places ==
=== Canada ===
- Eagle Creek, British Columbia, an unincorporated community in Cariboo Regional District, British Columbia
- Eagle Creek (Burnaby), a river in British Columbia
- Eagle Creek (Saskatchewan), a river in Saskatchewan
- Eagle Creek Regional Park, a park in Saskatchewan
- Rural Municipality of Eagle Creek No. 376, a municipality in Saskatchewan
- Eagle Creek (electoral district), a former provincial electoral district in Saskatchewan

=== United States ===
- Eagle Creek Formation, a geologic formation in Alaska
- Eagle Creek (Arizona), a river at the base of the White Mountain Range in Arizona
- Eagle Creek State Recreation Area, a state park in Shelby County, Illinois
- Eagle Creek Township, Gallatin County, Illinois, a township in Gallatin County, Illinois
- Eagle Creek Township, Lake County, Indiana, a township in Lake County, Indiana
- Eagle Creek Airpark, a public use airport in Indianapolis, Indiana
- Eagle Creek Park, a city park in Indianapolis, Indiana located along the Eagle Creek in Indiana
- Eagle Creek (Kentucky), a tributary of the Kentucky River in Kentucky
- Eagle Creek (Niobrara River tributary), a stream in Holt County, Nebraska
- Eagle Creek (Multnomah County, Oregon), a tributary of the Columbia River in Oregon
- Eagle Creek, Oregon, an unincorporated community in Clackamas County, Oregon
- Eagle Creek (Oregon) (disambiguation), many physical features in Oregon
- Eagle Creek, Pennsylvania, a Census Designated Place in Centre County, Pennsylvania
- Eagle Creek waterfalls, waterfalls on a tributary of the Columbia River in Oregon
- Eagle Creek (South Carolina), a tributary of the Ashley River (South Carolina)

== Businesses ==
- Eagle Creek (company), a luggage manufacturing company in Carlsbad, California
- Eagle Creek Golf Club, an eighteen-hole golf course in Orlando, Florida

== See also ==
- Eagle River (disambiguation)
- Eagle Lake (disambiguation)
- Eagle (disambiguation)
