= Aigle River =

Aigle River may refer to:

- Aigle River (Doda Lake), Quebec, Canada
- Aigle River (Desert River tributary), Quebec, Canada

== See also ==
- Aigle (disambiguation)
- Eagle River (disambiguation)
