= Screaming eagle =

Screaming eagle may refer to:

- Screaming eagle (wave), a tropical wave that resembles the head of an eagle
- Screaming Eagle Winery and Vineyards, a California boutique winery with limited production
- Screamin' Eagle, a wooden roller coaster at Six Flags St. Louis
- "Screamin' Eagle", an instrumental by The Desert Sessions on the 1998 album Volume 2: Status: Ships Commander Butchered
- The Boston College "Screaming Eagles" Marching Band, an alternative name for the Boston College Marching Band

== See also ==
- Screaming Eagles (disambiguation)
