= USS Eagle =

USS Eagle may refer to the following ships of the United States Navy:

- USS Eagle (1798), was a 14-gun schooner in service from 1798 to 1801
- USS Eagle (1812), was an 11-gun sloop in service on Lake Champlain during the War of 1812
- USS Eagle (1814), was a 20-gun brig also on Lake Champlain, launched and named while the 1812 Eagle was in British hands
- USS Eagle (1814 schooner) was a 12-gun schooner of the New Orleans station (US Navy)
- USS Eagle (1898), was a yacht purchased in 1898 and in service until 1919
- USS Eagle (SP-145), later renamed USS SP-145, was a patrol boat in commission from 1917 to 1919
- USS Eagle (AM-132), was a Q-ship renamed Captor (PYc-40) shortly after commissioning in 1942
- USS Eagle Boat 56 (PE-56), later USS PE-56, in commission from 1919 to 1945

== See also ==
- Eagle-class patrol craft, also known as "Eagle boats," commissioned in 1918 and 1919
- USCGC Eagle for two United States Coast Guard cutters
- USS Eaglet (SP-909)
- Eagle was the name of the Lunar Module on Apollo 11
