= Eagles (surname) =

Eagles is the surname of:

- Brennan Eagles, American football player
- Catherine Eagles (born 1958), American judge
- Chris Eagles (born 1985), English footballer
- Edmund Eagles, British painter
- Greg Eagles, American voice actor
- Jeanne Eagels (born Eugenia Eagles), American actress
- John Eagles (1783–1855), English artist and author
- Kim Eagles (born 1976), Canadian sport shooter
- Matt Eagles (born 1990), Australian rules footballer
- Thomas Eagles (1746–1812), English classical scholar

== See also ==
- Eagle (name)
