= Conte Forum =

Multi-purpose arena in Chestnut Hill, Massachusetts

- Kelley Rink

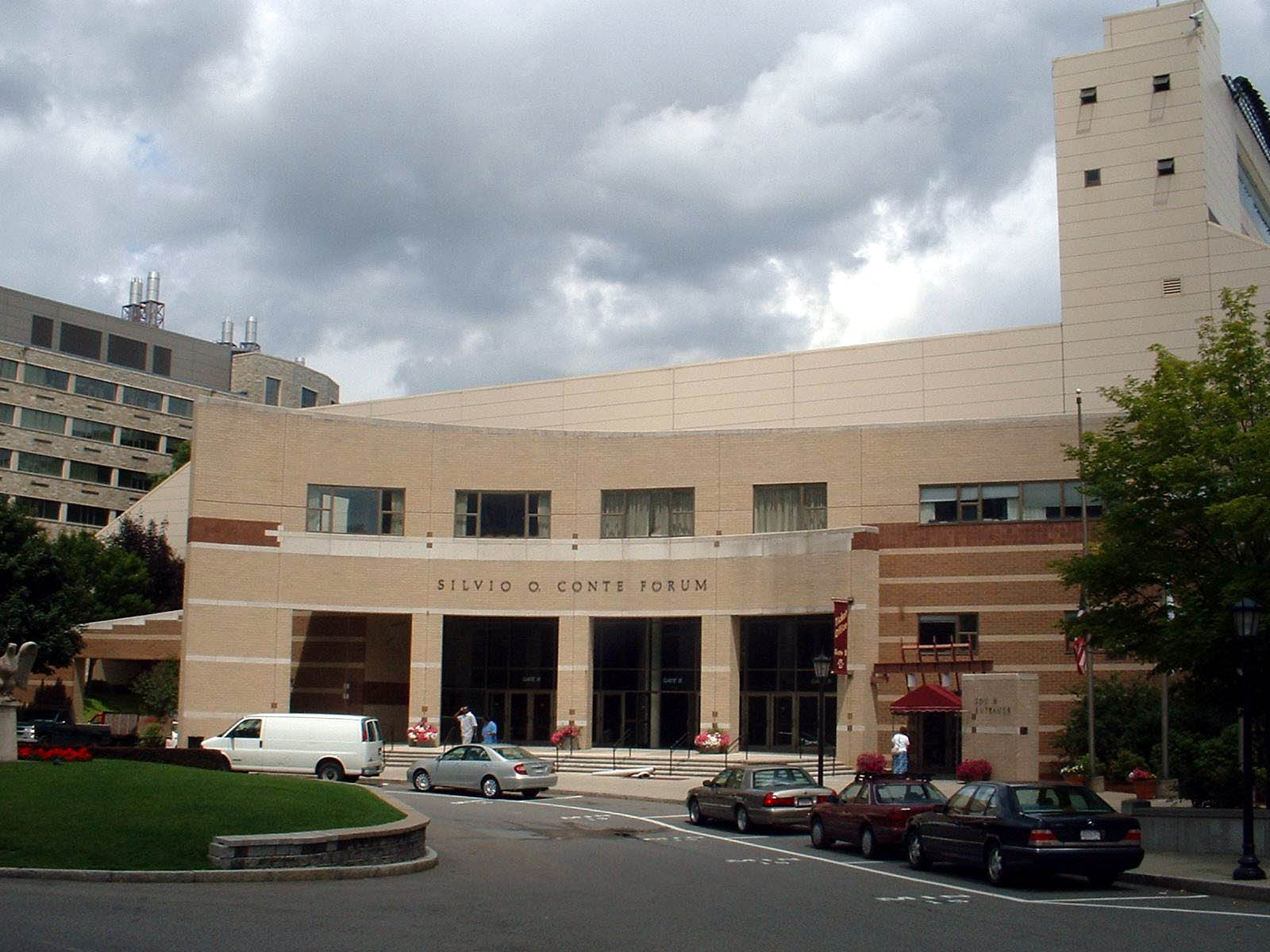
- Exterior view of the arena in 2006
- Interactive map of Conte Forum
- Full name: Silvio O. Conte Forum
- Address: Chestnut Hill, MA; United States
- Coordinates: 42°20′6″N 71°10′3″W
- Owner: Boston College
- Operator: Boston College Athletics
- Capacity: 7,884 (hockey); 8,606 (basketball)
- Type: Arena
- Surface: Multi-surface
- Field size: 200' x 87' (hockey)
- Current use: Basketball; Ice hockey
- Public transit: Green Line at Boston College

Construction
- Groundbreaking: July 1986
- Opened: October 24, 1988; 38 years ago
- Cost: $25 million ($68.1 million in 2025 dollars)
- Architect: Sasaki
- Structural engineer: Thornton Tomasetti
- General contractors: Richard White Sons, Inc.

Tenants
- Boston College Eagles (NCAA) teams: basketball and hockey

Website
- bceagles.com/conte-forum

The Silvio O. Conte Forum, commonly known as Conte Forum, Kelley Rink (for ice hockey games), or simply Conte, is an 8,606-seat multi-purpose arena which opened in 1988 in Boston, Massachusetts on the campus of Boston College in the Chestnut Hill neighborhood. Conte Forum is home to the Boston College Eagles men's and women's basketball and ice hockey teams as well as the Boston College Marching Band.

== History ==
Conte Forum is named for former United States congressman Silvio O. Conte, an alumnus of Boston College and Boston College Law School. The ice rink is named in honor of long-time BC hockey coach John "Snooks" Kelley. The entire arena is traditionally called "Kelley Rink" during hockey games.

Before the arena opened in 1988, the BC basketball teams played their home games in Roberts Center to the immediate southwest of Alumni Stadium, on the site of the present-day Merkert Chemistry Center. Games expected to draw more than its 4,400 capacity were moved off-campus to Boston Garden. The Eagles hockey teams played at McHugh Forum which was positioned parallel to Alumni Stadium. Conte Forum was built on the site of McHugh Forum, and is situated perpendicular to the football stadium. The arena is directly adjacent to Alumni, with some luxury boxes overlooking both the football field and arena floors.

Conte Forum seats 8,606 spectators in its basketball configuration and 7,884 when set up for hockey. The facility also houses 950-seat Power Gym which is used for BC volleyball games and as an auxiliary basketball court.

As the largest indoor venue on the BC campus, Conte Forum hosts larger university-related events including conferences and debates. It is the site of the annual "Pops-on-the-Heights" during the annual Parents' Weekend in the fall, a gala concert featuring the Boston Pops Orchestra which raises over $1.5 million for BC's academic scholarship fund. In the event of inclement weather, Conte Forum also hosts the university's commencement exercises.

Since 2008, Conte Forum has also hosted the Boston College AHANA Leadership Council Showdown in the spring, an increasingly popular dance competition between BC's various dance and cultural organizations. Conte has also hosted numerous concerts, including in recent years Akon, Third Eye Blind, hellogoodbye, The Roots, Kanye West, and The Academy Is, as well as Will Ferrell's Funny or Die Comedy Tour.

On January 5, 2014, the Conte Forum was the venue for Boston mayor Marty Walsh's inauguration.

In Boston's proposed bid for the 2024 Summer Olympics, Conte Forum was selected as a potential venue for various events, such as Wrestling and Judo. However, the city eventually withdrew the bid.

== Gallery ==
Conte Forum during a BC vs. West Virginia basketball game.

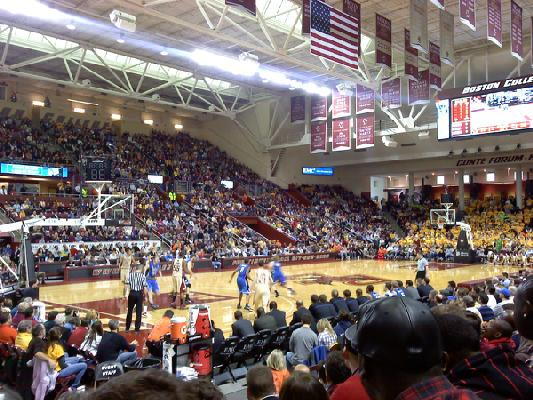
BC vs. Duke men's basketball game.

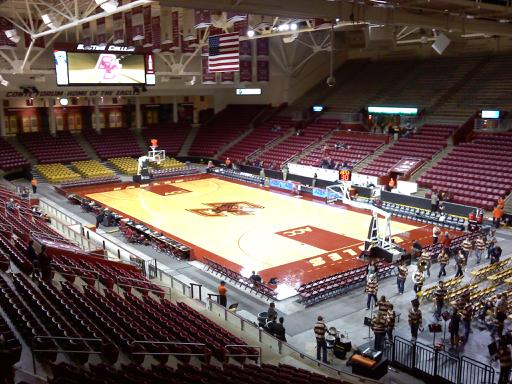
Conte Forum before a BC basketball game.

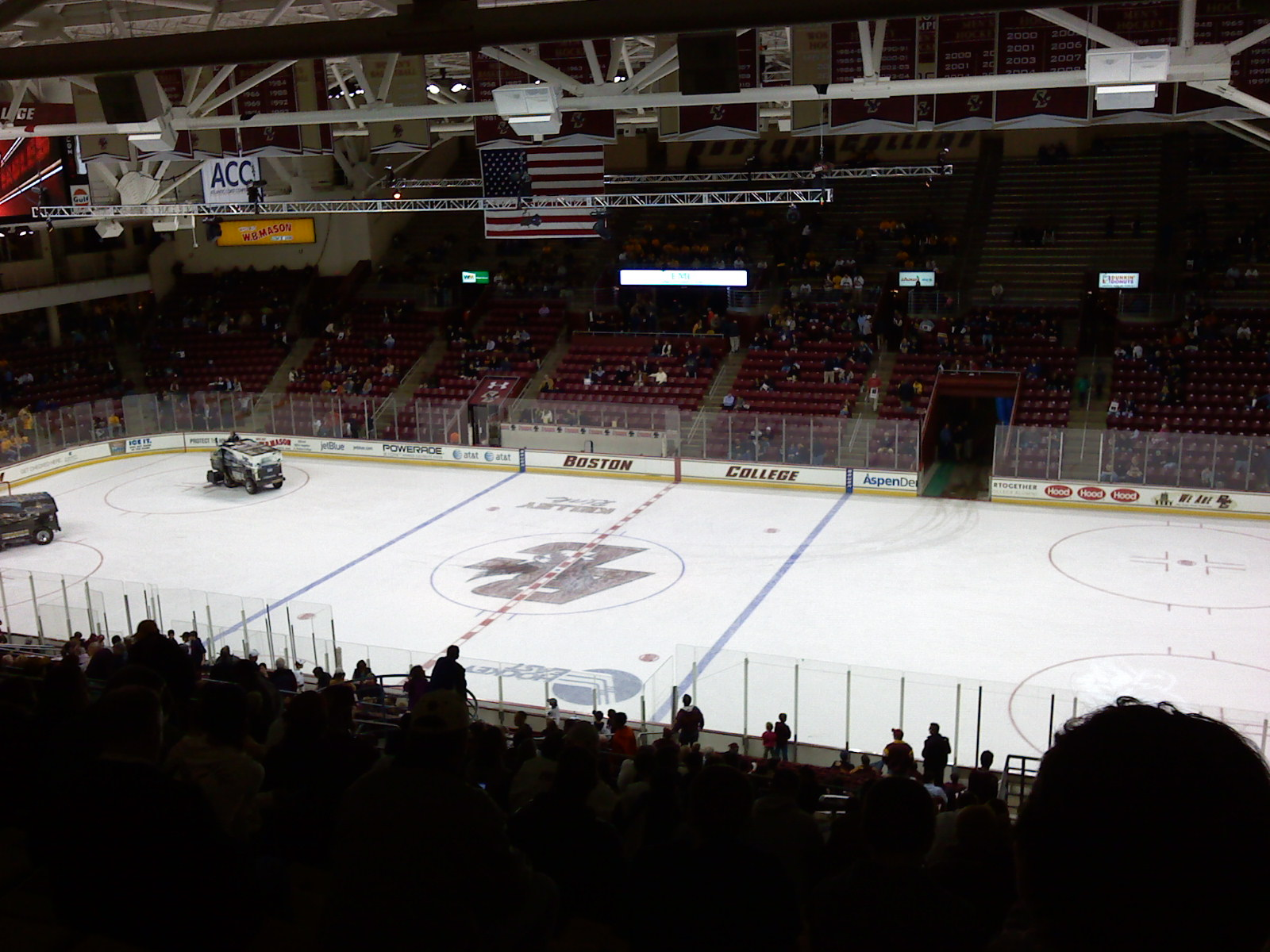
Kelley Rink before a BC hockey game.

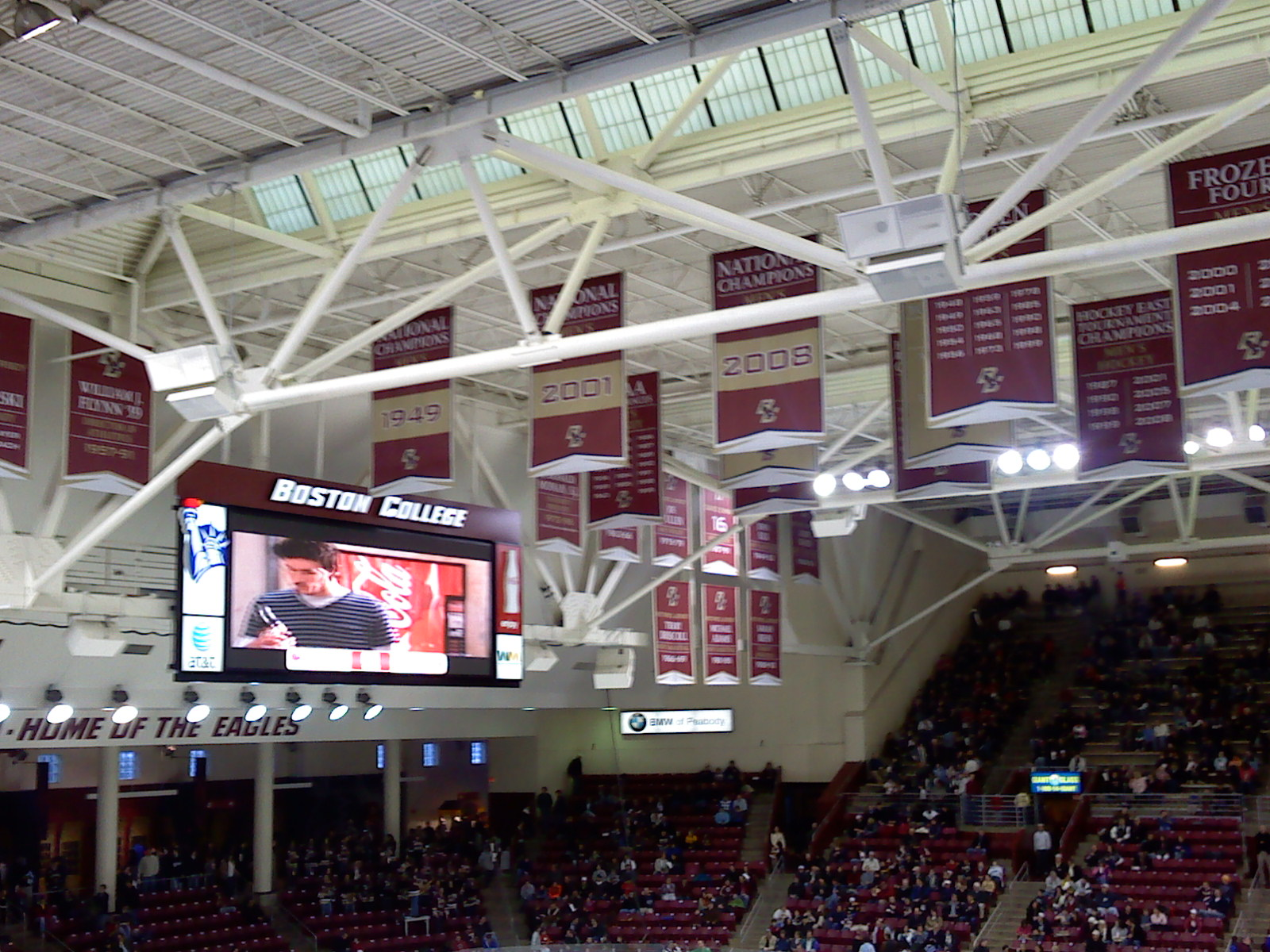
BC hockey's 1949, 2001, and 2008 national championship banners in the Conte Forum rafters.

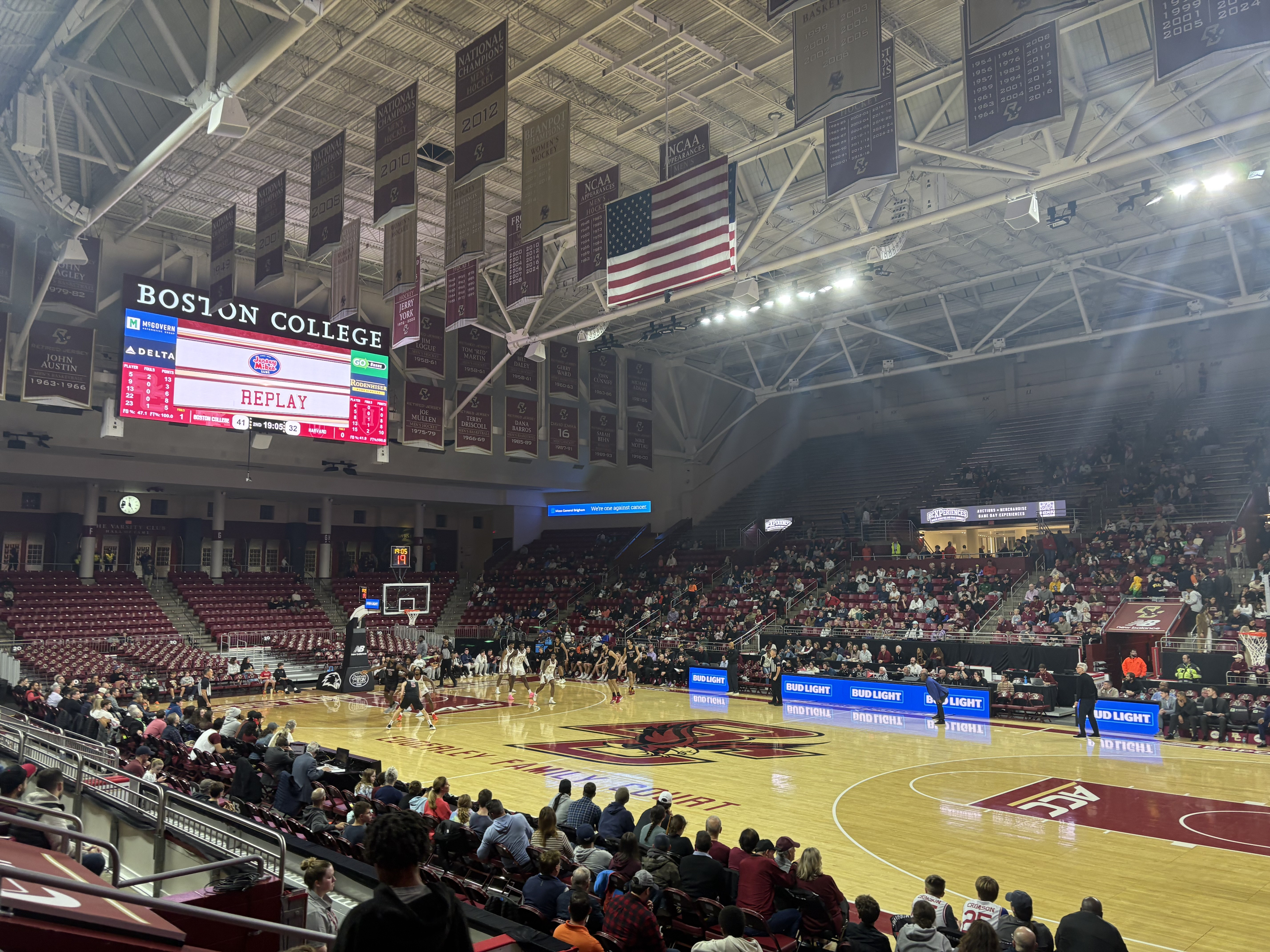
Conte Forum during BC vs. Harvard men's basketball. November 26, 2025.

== See also ==
- List of NCAA Division I basketball arenas

Preceded by McHugh Forum	Home of Boston College Eagles hockey 1988 – present	Succeeded by Current Arena
