= Screaming Eagles =

Screaming Eagles may refer to:

== Military ==
- 101st Airborne Division (United States), a U.S. Army Division
- 319th Missile Squadron, a U.S. Air Force ICBM operations unit
- VF-51, a U.S. Navy fighter squadron active 1943–1995

== Sports ==
- Screaming Eagles (MLS supporters association), a fan group of soccer team D.C. United
- Cape Breton Screaming Eagles, a Canadian junior ice hockey team in the QMJHL
- Espanola Screaming Eagles, a Canadian junior ice hockey team in Espanola, Ontario, 1962—2003
- Huron University Screeaming Eagles, the sports teams of Huron University, South Dakota, U.S.
- Miami Screaming Eagles, a founding team of the World Hockey Association that moved before the inaugural season started
- Minnesota State Screaming Eagles, a fictional American football team in the TV series Coach
- Salt Lake Screaming Eagles, an American indoor football team
- Southern Indiana Screaming Eagles, the athletic program of the University of Southern Indiana

== Other uses ==
- Screaming Eagles (film), a 1956 film starring Tom Tryon
- Sgt. Savage and his Screaming Eagles, a short-lived G.I. Joe toy line
- Boston College Marching Band
- "Screaming Eagles", a song by Sabaton from Coat of Arms

== See also ==
- Screaming eagle (disambiguation)
