= Aigle (disambiguation) =

Aigle is a municipality of the canton of Vaud, Switzerland.

Aigle is a French word which means eagle and may also refer to:

In geography:

- L'Aigle, a commune in the département of Orne, France
- Aigle (district), a district of the canton of Vaud, Switzerland
- Aigle River (Doda Lake), Quebec, Canada
- Aigle River (Desert River tributary), Quebec, Canada

In engineering:

- Aigle (rocket), a French experimental rocket

In business:

- Aigle (company), a French clothing brand

Of people:

- Caroline Aigle, the first woman to become fighter pilot in the Armée de l'Air
- Aigle, a character in the video games Rumble Roses and Rumble Roses XX

Ships named Aigle:

- List of French ships named Aigle
- Aigle-class destroyer
