= USS Eagle (SP-145) =

Patrol vessel of the United States Navy

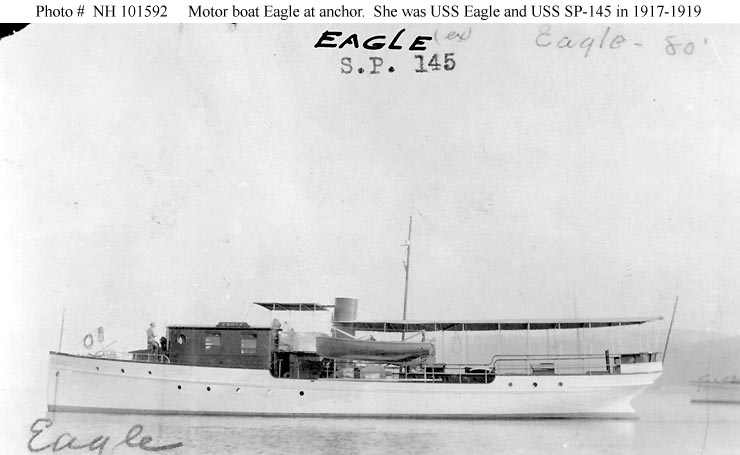
- Eagle as a civilian motorboat sometime between 1909 and 1917, prior to her U.S. Navy service.

History

United States
- Name: USS Eagle
- Namesake: Previous name retained
- Builder: J. M. Bayles and Son, Port Jefferson, New York
- Completed: 1909
- Acquired: 2 May 1917
- Commissioned: 10 September 1917
- Renamed: USS SP-145 April 1918
- Stricken: 11 March 1919
- Fate: Sold 25 June 1919
- Notes: Operated as private motorboat Eagle 1909-1917

General characteristics
- Type: Patrol vessel
- Length: 80 ft (24 m)
- Notes: The ship characteristics provided at NavSource Online clearly are excessive for an 80-foot (24-meter) patrol boat, and appear to have been mistakenly copied from another ship.

The sixth USS Eagle (SP-145), later renamed USS SP-145, was an armed motorboat that served in the United States Navy as a patrol vessel from 1917 to 1919.

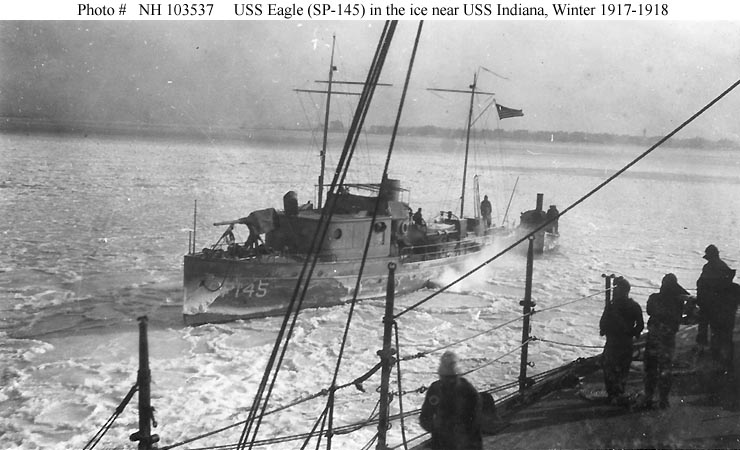
USS Eagle stuck in the ice during the winter of 1917–1918, photographed from battleship USS Indiana (BB-1).

Eagle was built as a civilian motorboat in 1909 by J. M. Bayles and Son at Port Jefferson, New York. The U.S. Navy acquired her from her owner, Colonel William Hester of Brooklyn, New York, on 2 May 1917 for use as a patrol vessel during World War I. She was commissioned on 10 September 1917 as USS Eagle (SP-145).

Eagle was assigned to the 3rd Naval District, and spent her naval career in the New York City area. She was renamed USS SP-145 in April 1918 to avoid confusion with the gunboat USS Eagle, which was in commission at the same time. (Note that neither of these ships should be confused with patrol boat USS Eaglet (SP-909), also in commission at the time.)

SP-145 was stricken from the Navy List on 11 March 1919 and sold on 25 June 1919.
