= Airtrike 850ti =

German aircraft motor

850ti
- Type: Aircraft engine
- National origin: Germany
- Manufacturer: Airtrike
- Major applications: Airtrike Eagle 5

The Airtrike 850ti is a German aircraft engine, that was designed and produced by Airtrike of Berlin for use in ultralight aircraft and in particular their Airtrike Eagle 5 design.

The manufacturer entered liquidation on 1 January 2017.

== Design and development ==
The engine is an in-line twin-cylinder four-stroke, 850 cc (51.9 cu in) displacement, liquid-cooled, petrol engine design, with a poly V belt reduction drive with reduction ratios from 2.0:1 to 4.5:1. It employs dual capacitor discharge ignition and produces 120 hp (89 kW) at 6500 rpm, with a compression ratio of 9:1.

== Applications ==
- Airtrike Eagle 5

== Specifications (850ti) ==
Data from Tacke

=== General characteristics ===
- Type: Single Twin cylinder, two stroke aircraft engine
- Bore: 92 mm (3.6 in)
- Stroke: 66 mm (2.6 in)
- Displacement: 850 cc (51.9 cu in)
- Length: 630 mm (24.8 in)
- Width: 560 mm (22.0 in)
- Height: 500 mm (19.7 in)
- Dry weight: 78 kg (172.0 lb)

=== Components ===
- Fuel type: petrol
- Cooling system: liquid
- Reduction gear: Poly V belt

=== Performance ===
- Power output: 120 hp (89 kW)

== See also ==
Related lists

- List of aircraft engines
