= Eagle Pass =

Eagle Pass may refer to:

== Canada ==
- Eagle Pass (British Columbia), a mountain pass through the Gold Range of the Monashee Mountains

== United States ==
=== Communities ===
- Eagle Pass, Texas, a city and county seat

=== Mountain passes ===
- Eagle Pass (Coconino County, Arizona), Coconino County, Arizona
- Eagle Pass (Graham County, Arizona), Graham County, Arizona
- Eagle Pass (Maricopa County, Arizona), Maricopa County, Arizona
- Eagle Pass (San Bernardino County, California), San Bernardino County, California
- Eagle Pass (Tuolumne County, California), Tuolumne County, California
- Eagle Pass (Colorado), La Plata County, Colorado
- Eagle Pass (Idaho), Power County, Idaho
- Eagle Pass (Lake County, Montana)
- Eagle Pass (Nevada), Nye County, Nevada
- Eagle Pass (New York), Franklin County, New York
- Eagle Pass (Washington), Sawtooth Ridge
- Eagle Pass (Park County, Wyoming), Park County, Wyoming
- Eagle Pass (Washakie Range), Washakie Range, Wyoming
