= Eagle (surname) =

Eagle is a surname.

== People ==
=== Native Americans ===
- Adam Fortunate Eagle (born 1929), Ojibwa activist
- Big Eagle (c. 1827–1906), Mdewakanton Sioux leader
- Don Eagle (1925–1966), Mohawk Native American professional wrestler
- Running Eagle, a female Piegan war chief
- Chief War Eagle (c. 1785–1851), a Santee Sioux leader
- Chief White Eagle (c. 1825–1914), Native American chief of the Ponca, politician, and civil rights leader
- William Weatherford (1780–1824), a Muscogee leader also known as Red Eagle

=== Sports ===
- Ian Eagle, sports commentator
- Joshua Eagle (born 1973), Australian tennis player
- Robert Eagle (footballer), English footballer
- Trevor Eagle (1932–2000), New Zealand swimmer and businessman

=== Politicians ===
- Angela Eagle (born 1961), Labour Member of Parliament for Wallasey
- James Philip Eagle (1837–1904), Governor of Arkansas; husband of Mary Kavanaugh Eagle
- Maria Eagle (born 1961), British politician and solicitor
- Mary Kavanaugh Eagle (1854–1903), American activist, clubwoman and book editor; wife of James Philip Eagle
- Tim Eagle, Conservative member of the Scottish Parliament

=== Artists and musicians ===
- Acee Blue Eagle (1907–1959), Muscogee Creek artist
- Douglas Spotted Eagle, Native American flutist
- Eagle Pennell, American independent filmmaker
- Jay Red Eagle, Cherokee flutist
- Kathleen Eagle, American novelist
- Michael Eagle II, American rapper and comedian

=== Other ===
- Albert Eagle, English mathematician
- Charles K. Eagle, American businessman

== Fictional characters ==
- Eddie Eagle, mascot of a National Rifle Association program teaching young children to avoid guns
- Emil Eagle, a Disney character
- Sam Eagle, a Muppet
