= Eagle River =

Eagle River may refer to:

== Streams ==
In the United States:

- Eagle River (Bradfield Canal), Alaska
- Eagle River (Colorado), a tributary of the Colorado River
- Eagle River (Cook Inlet), Alaska
- Eagle River (Favorite Channel), Alaska
- Eagle River (Michigan), a river flowing into Lake Superior
- Eagle River (Wisconsin River tributary), a tributary of the Wisconsin River

In Canada:

- Eagle River (Labrador)
- Two rivers in British Columbia:
  - Eagle River (Dease River), a river flowing into the Dease River
  - Eagle River (Shuswap Lake), a river flowing into Shuswap Lake

== Communities ==
In the United States:

- Eagle River, Alaska
- Eagle River, Michigan
- Eagle River, Wisconsin

In Canada:

- Eagle River, Ontario

== Buildings ==
- Eagle River Lighthouse, in Eagle River, Michigan, United States

== See also ==
- Eagle Creek (disambiguation)
- Eagle Lake (disambiguation)
- Eagle (disambiguation)
- Aigle River (disambiguation)
- Eagle River (Wisconsin)
