= HMS Eaglet =

Five ships and a training establishment of the Royal Navy have borne the name HMS Eaglet:

- HMS Eaglet (1655) was an 8-gun ketch built in 1655 and sold in 1674.
- HMS Eaglet (1691) was a 10-gun ketch launched in 1691 and captured in 1693 by the French off the Isle of Arran.
- HMS Eaglet (1855) was a paddle vessel, hired between 1855 and 1857.
- HMS Eaglet (1918) was launched in 1804 as Eagle and renamed whilst a training ship in 1918. She was destroyed by fire in 1926 and the wreck was sold in 1927.
- HMS Eaglet (1926) was a 24-class sloop launched as Sir Bevis in 1918, renamed Irwell in 1923 and Eaglet in 1926. She was broken up in 1971.
- HMS Eaglet (shore establishment) was founded in 1904 and moved onshore after the scrapping of the last named ship in 1971.

== See also ==
- HMS Eagle - for similarly named ships of the Royal Navy.
