= Eagle Lake (St. Louis County, Minnesota) =

Lake in the state of Minnesota, United States

- Location within Minnesota
- Location: St. Louis County, Minnesota
- Coordinates: 46°57′8″N 92°3′56″W
- Type: lake

Eagle Lake is a lake in St. Louis County, in the U.S. state of Minnesota.

Eagle Lake was named for the fact eagles nested there. Eagle lake has an area of 113.47 acres and has approximately 1.85 miles of shoreline. Being a bog lake, it is shallow, at only around 8 feet in maximum depth, with dark stained water. It serves as one of the headwaters of the Lester River, which flows through the lake from an origin point in a nearby marsh. Fish species include [Bluegill], [Black Bullhead], [Northern Pike], [Yellow Perch], [Creek Chub], and [White Sucker]. The lake has a substrate of cobble and gravel with silt and heavy weed cover near shore.

== See also ==
- List of lakes in Minnesota
