= Eagle Township =

Eagle Township may refer to the following places in the United States:

- Eagle Township, LaSalle County, Illinois
- Eagle Township, Boone County, Indiana
- Eagle Township, Black Hawk County, Iowa
- Eagle Township, Kossuth County, Iowa
- Eagle Township, Sioux County, Iowa
- Eagle Township, Barber County, Kansas
- Eagle Township, Kingman County, Kansas
- Eagle Township, Clinton County, Michigan
- Eagle Township, Carlton County, Minnesota
- Eagle Township, Brown County, Ohio
- Eagle Township, Hancock County, Ohio
- Eagle Township, Vinton County, Ohio
