= Edmund Eagles =

English painter

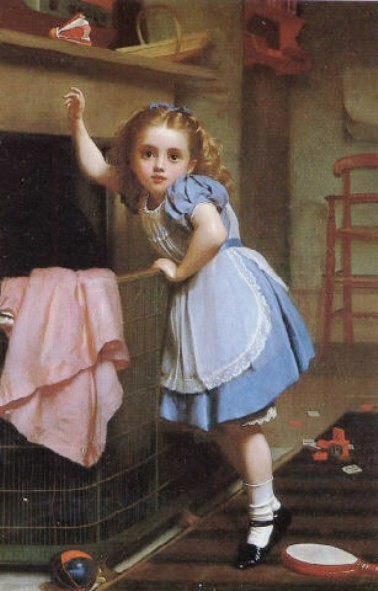
Played Out by Edmund Eagles

Edmund Eagles (active between 1851 and 1877) was a British painter. He grew up at Hanenfield Lodge, Great Missenden, Buckinghamshire and lived in London 1866 to 1869. His works include “The Little Prisoner”, “Come in my Child”, “The way to make a Pancake” and “The Hobby Horse”. 18 of his paintings are exhibited at the Royal Academy of Arts.
