= Eagle Lake (Tulare County) =

Lake in the state of California, United States

- Location within California Location within the United States
- Location: Sequoia National Park, Tulare County, California, US
- Coordinates: 36°25′03″N 118°36′21″W
- Type: Lake
- Basin countries: United States
- Surface elevation: 10,000 ft (3,000 m)

Eagle Lake is an alpine lake in the Southern Sierra Nevada near Mineral King in Sequoia National Park. The lake can be reached by a 3.5-mile-long (5.6 km) hike from Mineral King Valley and lies at 10,000 feet (3,000 m) above sea level.

== See also ==
- List of lakes in California
