= Eagle Creek (Oregon) =

Eagle Creek may refer to any of a number of places in the U.S. state of Oregon:

| name | type | elevation | coordinate | USGS Map | GNIS ID |
|---|---|---|---|---|---|
| Abbot Creek (Jefferson County, Oregon) | Stream | 2,736 ft (834 m) | 44°34′12″N 121°37′17″W | Prairie Farm Spring | 1136994 |
| Eagle Butte Creek (Lane County, Oregon) | Stream | 1,765 ft (538 m) | 43°47′34″N 122°19′24″W | Huckleberry Mountain | 1141461 |
| Eagle Creek, Oregon | Populated Place | 344 ft (105 m) | 45°21′26″N 122°21′32″W | Estacada | 1120258 |
| Eagle Creek (Polk County, Oregon) | Stream | 732 ft (223 m) | 44°53′18″N 123°43′02″W | Warnicke Creek | 1120259 |
| Eagle Creek (Mount Moriah, Union County, Oregon) | Stream | 3,117 ft (950 m) | 45°27′43″N 117°41′38″W | Mount Moriah | 1120260 |
| Eagle Creek (Wasco County, Oregon) | Stream | 1,007 ft (307 m) | 45°02′09″N 121°06′34″W | Dant | 1120261 |
| Eagle Creek (Tillamook County, Oregon) | Stream | 295 ft (90 m) | 45°30′50″N 123°37′10″W | Jordan Creek | 1120262 |
| Eagle Creek (Umatilla County, Oregon) | Stream | 1,949 ft (594 m) | 45°45′55″N 118°26′41″W | Athena | 1120263 |
| Eagle Creek (Kloster Mountain, Lane County, Oregon) | Stream | 1,027 ft (313 m) | 43°50′27″N 122°46′35″W | Kloster Mountain | 1134059 |
| Eagle Creek (Douglas County, Oregon) | Stream | 1,591 ft (485 m) | 43°17′47″N 122°32′11″W | Illahee Rock | 1141466 |
| Eagle Creek (Mount David Douglas, Lane County, Oregon) | Stream | 2,241 ft (683 m) | 43°40′39″N 122°14′38″W | Mount David Douglas | 1141467 |
| Eagle Creek (Powder River) | Stream | 2,106 ft (642 m) | 44°44′45″N 117°10′21″W | Daly Creek | 1141468 |
| Eagle Creek (Bosley Butte, Curry County, Oregon) | Stream | 253 ft (77 m) | 42°12′57″N 124°08′37″W | Bosley Butte | 1141469 |
| Eagle Creek (Josephine Mountain, Curry County, Oregon) | Stream | 2,146 ft (654 m) | 42°14′51″N 123°50′12″W | Josephine Mountain | 1141470 |
| Eagle Creek (Crook County, Oregon) | Stream | 3,255 ft (992 m) | 44°10′46″N 120°37′35″W | Eagle Rock | 1141471 |
| Eagle Creek (Multnomah County, Oregon) | Stream | 79 ft (24 m) | 45°38′26″N 121°55′57″W | Bonneville Dam | 1141472 |
| Eagle Creek (Jubilee Lake, Union County, Oregon) | Stream | 3,038 ft (926 m) | 45°45′15″N 117°56′55″W | Jubilee Lake | 1141473 |
| Eagle Creek (Grant County, Oregon) | Stream | 4,711 ft (1,436 m) | 44°34′05″N 118°50′44″W | Cougar Rock | 1152951 |
| Eagle Creek (Clackamas County, Oregon) | Stream | 197 ft (60 m) | 45°21′11″N 122°22′57″W | Redland | 1167853 |
| Eagle Creek, Multnomah County, Oregon | Historic locale | 121 ft (37 m) | 45°38′27″N 121°55′50″W | Bonneville Dam | 1167762 |
| Eagle Creek Canyon | Valley | 4,124 ft (1,257 m) | 44°51′25″N 117°18′34″W | Sparta | 1152809 |
| Eagle Creek Cutoff | Trail | 3,448 ft (1,051 m) | 45°15′19″N 122°01′57″W | Wildcat Mountain | 1167854 |
| Eagle Creek Forest Camp | Locale | 3,750 ft (1,140 m) | 44°59′05″N 117°22′04″W | Sparta Butte | 1154115 |
| Eagle Creek Lookout | Locale | 2,523 ft (769 m) | 45°18′25″N 122°06′32″W | Wildcat Mountain | 1167855 |
| Eagle Creek Overlook Group Camp | Locale | 125 ft (38 m) | 45°38′32″N 121°55′51″W | Bonneville Dam | 1952999 |
| Eagle Creek Recreation Site | Locale | 177 ft (54 m) | 45°38′26″N 121°55′26″W | Bonneville Dam | 1141474 |
| Eagle Creek Trail (Hood River County, Oregon) | Trail | 3,212 ft (979 m) | 45°34′21″N 121°49′14″W | Wahtum Lake | 1141475 |
| Eagle Creek Trail (Curry County, Oregon) | Trail | 1,585 ft (483 m) | 42°15′34″N 124°08′12″W | Collier Butte | 1141476 |
| Eagle Creek Upper Falls | Falls | 968 ft (295 m) | 45°16′39″N 122°11′44″W | Cherryville | 1154927 |
| Eagle Island Creek | Stream | 1,834 ft (559 m) | 44°52′22″N 116°51′43″W | Cuddy Mountain | 1141478 |
| East Fork Eagle Creek (Hood River County, Oregon) | Stream | 1,138 ft (347 m) | 45°35′01″N 121°51′10″W | Wahtum Lake | 1141558 |
| East Fork Eagle Creek (Baker County, Oregon) | Stream | 4,016 ft (1,224 m) | 44°58′58″N 117°22′27″W | Sparta Butte | 1141559 |
| East Fork West Eagle Creek (Union County, Oregon) | Stream | 5,499 ft (1,676 m) | 45°05′35″N 117°28′39″W | Bennet Peak | 1120330 |
| Kirby Creek (Baker County, Oregon) | Stream | 2,096 ft (639 m) | 44°44′49″N 117°11′01″W | Daly Creek | 1158309 |
| Little Eagle Creek (Clackamas County, Oregon) | Stream | 961 ft (293 m) | 45°19′01″N 122°13′10″W | Cherryville | 1145156 |
| Little Eagle Creek (Baker County, Oregon) | Stream | 2,926 ft (892 m) | 44°53′28″N 117°15′46″W | Sparta Butte | 1145157 |
| North Fork Eagle Creek (Clackamas County, Oregon) | Stream | 509 ft (155 m) | 45°19′30″N 122°17′20″W | Estacada | 1167857 |
| South Fork Eagle Creek (Clackamas County, Oregon) | Stream | 1,220 ft (370 m) | 45°17′07″N 122°09′01″W | Cherryville | 1167865 |
| West Eagle Creek (Union County, Oregon) | Stream | 4,426 ft (1,349 m) | 45°01′10″N 117°27′15″W | Bennet Peak | 1128826 |
