= Jay Red Eagle =

American musician

Jay Red Eagle is a Native American flautist and Native American artist whose businesses include lines of music clothing called Nashville Threads and M.T. Medicine Bottle. His clothing and shoe designs include country music and Native American clothing, Hip hop clothing, and the first ever Cherokee shoes specifically designed using the Cherokee syllabary and language. He is an enrolled member of the Cherokee Nation. His debut CD was entitled Vision. He was born in Tahlequah, Oklahoma, and in 2010 he released a second CD titled Cherokee Nation which is also composed of Native American flute music.

Red Eagle won two Music Awards in 2006: Best Native American Artist of the Year and Native American Flutist of the Year. In 2007 Red Eagle was voted Flutist of the Year a second time.
