= USCGC Eagle =

USCGC Eagle may refer to:

- USCGC Eagle (1925), was a "100-foot" Eagle-class patrol boat, commissioned in 1925 and transferred to the U.S. Navy in 1936
- USCGC Eagle (WIX-327), is a Gorch Fock-class barque originally commissioned as Segelschulschiff Horst Wessel, a German training vessel taken as war reparations by the United States and commissioned into the Coast Guard in 1946; she is still in active service

== See also ==
- USRC Eagle
- USS Eagle
