= Eagle Pass (Lake County, Montana) =

- Interactive map of Eagle Pass
- Elevation: 7,464 feet (2,275 m)

Third Approach
- Location: Lake County, Montana, US
- Coordinates: 47.4421556°N 113.9453801°W

Eagle Pass (el. 7,464 ft/2,275 m) is a high mountain pass in Lake County, Montana in the United States.

It is called nšt̓ew̓s sx̣ʷcusi in Salish, or "Standing in Middle" because a pillar of rock stands in the middle of the pass.
