= Fujitsu Eagle =

Hard disk drive for 19-inch rack

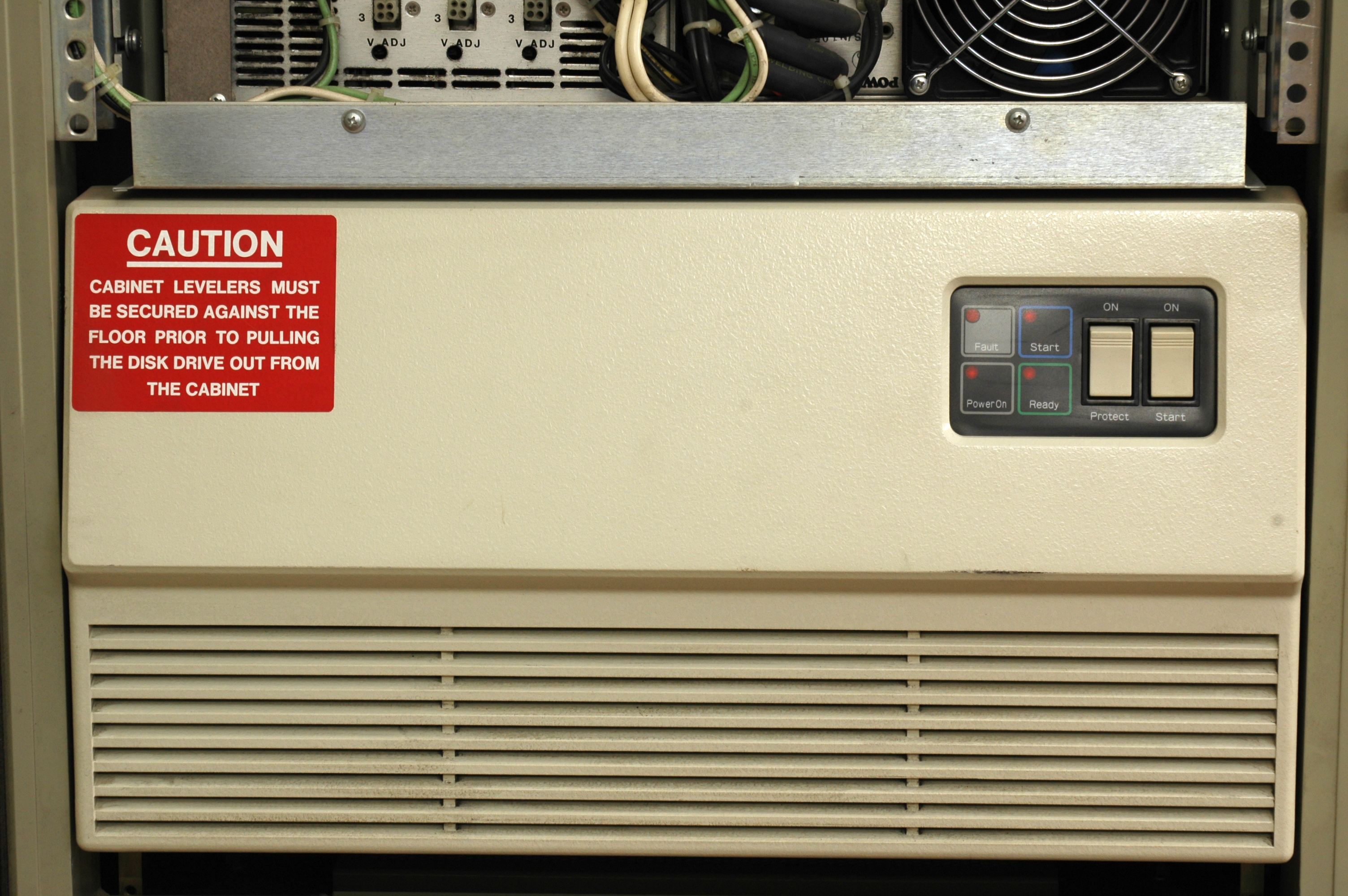
Fujitsu Eagle

The M2351A "Eagle" (also known as the Eagle-1) was a Winchester-stye hard disk drive manufactured by Fujitsu with an SMD interface that was used on many servers in the mid-1980s. It was released in 1982, and offered an unformatted capacity of 474.2 MB in 10 1/2 inches (270 mm) (6U) of 19-inch rack space, at a retail price of about US$10,000. Eagles are 264 millimetres (10.4 in) high, 482 millimetres (19.0 in) wide, and 700 millimetres (28 in) deep, and weigh 65 kilograms (143 lb).

The data density, access speed, reliability, use of a standard interface, and price point combined to make it a very popular product used by many system manufacturers, such as Sun Microsystems. The Eagle was also popular at installations of DEC VAX systems, as third-party storage systems were often dramatically more cost-effective and space-dense than those vendor-supplied.

The model 2351A incorporated six platters rotating at 3,961 rpm, taking half a minute to spin up. The Eagle used 10.5-inch-diameter (270 mm) platters, unlike most of its competitors, which still used the 14-inch (360 mm) standard set in 1962 by the IBM 1311. Two moving heads accessed each data surface (20 heads total), one more head was dedicated to the servo mechanism.

The Eagle achieved a data transfer rate of 1.8 MB/s (a contemporary 5 1/4-inch (130 mm) PC disk would only deliver 0.4 MB/s). The Eagle has an 18ms average access time (the time required to move the heads to the desired track), and 8.33 ms average rotational latency (the time required for the desired sector to spin around to the heads). Power consumption (of the drive alone) was about 600 watts. The drives had a rated component lifetime of 5 years, with 10,000 hours MTBF and only 30 minutes mean time to repair when being serviced. Fujitsu announced the project in 1981, and shipment commenced in 1982. The drive used MFM encoding.

The model 2351AF added 60 fixed heads (20 surfaces × 3 cylinders) for access to a separate area of 1.7 MB.

The line also included an M2350 Parallel Transfer Drive (PTD), with the same capacity as the original Eagle, but the PTD versions targeted applications that needed higher transfer speeds and larger capacity, particularly vector and graphics processing. They could be ordered with heads in the original single SMD channel accessing all 20 heads configuration, or as four channels each accessing 5 heads, or five channels accessing 4 heads. A five channel system would have five times the transfer speed, up to 9.29 MB/s, but would also require five disk channels in the computer controlling it. The M2350 could be synchronized with other M2350 drives so that the platters spun identically and thus had no additional latency, essentially behaving as a single larger drive in a way that foreshadowed later RAID technology. M2350's were the same width and depth as the original Eagle, but slightly taller and heavier.

In 1985, M2361 and M2361A "SuperEagle" or "Eagle-1.5" models were released, which were very similar externally (same height and width but slightly deeper at 30.3 inches (770 mm)), but with greater capacity and transfer speed. While still using the same platter and head layout, they used RLL encoding, spun at 3600 RPM, and weighed slightly more at 179 pounds (81 kg), and had a redesigned power supply. The M2361 has 64 sectors per track, 20 tracks per cylinder (one for each platter surface), and 842 cylinders per drive, for a rated capacity of 549MB, and the M2361A has a slightly higher density of 68 sectors per track yielding 689MB rated capacity. The M2361A could achieve 2.458 MB/s from the higher density of storage, but the head positioning and rotational latencies were the same as for the original Eagle.

As technology to increase areal storage density improved, the hard disk market moved towards smaller platters and thus smaller and less expensive drives. While the Eagle and SuperEagle were still on the market, Fujitsu was also offering 8 inches (200 mm) platter SMD drives like the M2322, which was 11% the size of an Eagle and 16% of the weight while storing 35% as much at 168MB.
