= HMS Eagle =

Eighteen ships of the Royal Navy have borne the name HMS Eagle, after the eagle.

- English ship Eagle (1592) was an ex-merchantman purchased in 1592 and in use as a careening hulk. She was sold in 1683.
- English ship Eagle (1648) was a 6-gun shallop sloop, listed until 1653.
- English ship Eagle (1650) was a 12-gun ship, previously the French ship Aigle, captured in 1650 and sold in 1655.
- HMS Eagle (1660) was a 22-gun armed ship, launched as Selby in 1654. She was renamed HMS Eagle in 1660, used as a fireship from 1674 and sunk as a foundation in 1694.
- HMS Eagle (1670) was a 6-gun fireship captured from the Algerians in 1670 and expended in 1671.
- HMS Eagle (1672) was a 6-gun fireship purchased in 1672 and foundered in 1673.
- HMS Eagle (1679) was a 70-gun third rate launched in 1679, rebuilt in 1699 and wrecked in 1707.
- HMS Eagle (1696) was a 10-gun advice boat launched in 1696 and wrecked in 1703.
- HMS Eagle (c.1745 fireship) was a fireship sunk in 1745 as a breakwater.
- HMS Eagle (1745) was a 58-gun fourth rate launched in 1745 and sold in 1767.
- HMS Eagle (1754) was a 14-gun sloop launched in 1745. Her fate is unknown.
- HMS Eagle (1774) was a 64-gun third rate launched in 1774. She was allegedly attacked by the submersible Turtle during the American Revolution, was placed on harbour service from 1790 and renamed HMS Buckingham in 1800. She was broken up in 1812.
- HMS Eagle (1794) was a 4-gun gunvessel, formerly a Dutch hoy purchased in 1794. She was sold in 1804.
- HMS Eagle (1803) was a 12-gun gun-brig, previously the French Venteux. Loire captured her in 1803. The Royal Navy renamed her HMS Eclipse in 1804 and sold her in 1807.
- HMS Eagle (1804) was a 74-gun third rate launched in 1804. She was reduced to 50 guns in 1830 and then became a training school in 1860, being renamed HMS Eaglet in 1918. She was lost in a fire in 1926; the wreck was sold in 1927.
- HMS Eagle (1812) was a one-gun brig built in 1812 that served as a tender to Poictiers. The American fishing smack Yankee used a stratagem to capture Eagle on 4 July 1812.
- HMS Eagle (1814) was an American gunboat captured at the Battle of Lake Borgne on 14 December 1814. She remained in service until at least 4 June 1815. Prize money for her and the other vessels captured at the battle was paid in July 1821.
- HMS Eagle (shore establishment) was the name of the Royal Naval Volunteer Reserve training facility at Liverpool from 1904. It was renamed HMS Eaglet in 1918.
- HMS Eagle (1918) was an early aircraft carrier, converted from an unfinished Chilean battleship, Almirante Cochrane, launched in 1918, and sunk in 1942.
- HMS Eagle was to have been an Audacious-class aircraft carrier, laid down in 1944, but cancelled in 1945.
- HMS Eagle (R05) was an Audacious-class aircraft carrier originally designated HMS Audacious, launched in 1946 and broken up in 1978.

== Battle honours ==
Ships named Eagle have earned the following battle honours:

- Portland, 1653
- Gabbard, 1653
- Lowestoft, 1665
- Orfordness, 1666
- Barfleur, 1692
- Gibraltar, 1704
- Velez Malaga, 1704
- Ushant, 1747
- Sadras, 1782
- Providien, 1782
- Negapatam, 1782
- Trincomalee, 1782
- Calabria, 1940
- Mediterranean, 1940
- Malta Convoys, 1942

== See also ==
- HMS Eaglet
- French ship Aigle
