= Eagle Lake (Carver County, Minnesota) =

Lake in the state of Minnesota, United States

- Location within Minnesota
- Location: Carver County, Minnesota
- Coordinates: 44°48.5′N 93°56′W
- Type: lake

Eagle Lake is a lake in Carver County, Minnesota, in the United States.

Eagle Lake was named from the fact an eagle's nest was seen there by early settlers.

== See also ==
- List of lakes in Minnesota
