= Eagle (steamboat) =

1900 steamboat used on Puget Sound

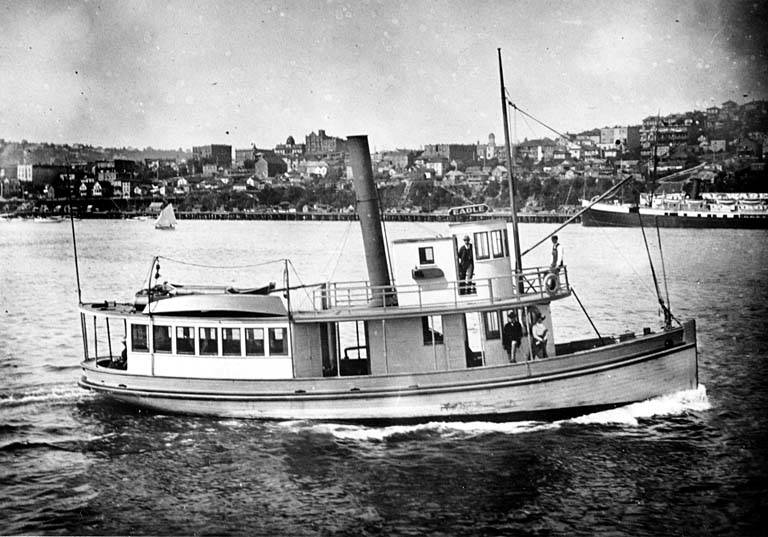
- Eagle in Elliott Bay circa 1901.

History
- Name: Eagle
- Route: Puget Sound
- In service: 1900
- Out of service: 1902
- Identification: US registry 136812
- Fate: Destroyed by fire

General characteristics
- Type: inland steamboat
- Tonnage: 40 gross, 23 net tons
- Length: 53.8 ft (16.40 m)
- Beam: 15.5 ft (4.72 m)
- Depth: 5.4 ft (1.65 m)
- Installed power: steam engine
- Propulsion: propeller

Eagle was a passenger steamboat built in 1900 which served on Puget Sound until it was destroyed by fire.

== Design and construction ==
Eagle was a smaller type of steamboat called a "steam launch". The wooden vessel was built at Eagle Harbor, Washington to run on routes connecting Seattle and Bainbridge Island, Washington. Eagle was 53.8 feet (16.4 m) long, beam 15.5 feet (4.7 m), and a depth of hold of 5.4. The overall size of the vessel was 40 gross tons and 23 registered tons. The vessel's US steamboat registration number was 136812.

== Career ==
Eagle was destroyed by fire in 1902 at Eagle Harbor. The vessel was replaced in service by the Florence K.
