= The Eagle (sinkhole) =

Sinkhole in Guangxi, China

- Location: Leye County, Guangxi, South China, China
- Depth: 630 feet
- Length: 1,000 ft (300 m)
- Discovery: 2022
- Geology: karst terrain
- Entrances: three

The Eagle is a sinkhole situated near Ping'e village, in Leye County, Guangxi Zhuang Autonomous Region, South China, discovered in 2022.

== Discovery ==
This particular sinkhole in Leye County was first identified in satellite images by experienced sinkhole finder Hongying Wu, "Crow". After spotting this sinkhole, a group of eight scientists and explorers including Wu gathered to confirm its existence.

On May 6, 2022, scientist Yuanhai Zhang and Lixin Chen, founder of the Guangxi 702 Cave Expedition Club, led the expedition in Leye County, Guangxi Zhuang Autonomous Region, South China. Chen led the descent into the sinkhole, the expedition team used the single-rope technique to descend a vertical cliff into the sinkhole. Not long after, the group reached a terrain they could continue on, but it was not yet the bottom of the sinkhole. To get there, they had to pass through a verdant, ancient forest that towered 130 feet above them. Sinkholes with such forests in them are sometimes referred to as "tiankeng" or "Heavenly pits". Dense undergrowth covered the rocky ground, and giant vines reached the explorers' shoulders. After a few hours, the team finally reached a small flat patch of ground that marked the lowest point of the pit, where they saw a family of eagles circling above, the explorers named the tiankeng The Eagle.

In June 2022, the group explored The Eagle several more times, bringing with them an even larger team of scientists and a television crew. The explorers penetrated three chasms in the rock of the sinkhole and found caves inside that had already collapsed. However, traces on the walls indicated the existence of an ancient underground river that created them. In addition to The Eagle, the scientists found several smaller, degraded sinkholes, which seems to support their hypothesis that this group of sinkholes is separate and unrelated to the nearby Dashiwei sinkhole group in Leye. When the team descended into the vertical shaft southeast of The Eagle, they found a small underground lake with turquoise water along the estimated path of the ancient river.

== Description ==
The sinkhole is estimated to have opened up within the last 100,000 years. The sinkhole was formed in karst terrain, which means rock below the surface can easily be dissolved by groundwater circulating through the bedrock. The large hole measures over 1,000 feet in length, almost 500 feet wide and 630 feet deep, with a volume of over 176 million cubic feet. Experts classified the sinkhole as large with three cave entrances in the chasm. In the forest of the sinkhole there are probably many species of small animals and plants unknown to science. The forest has shoulder-high vegetation and tall trees. Explorers found a large area of wild plantain (Heliconia) species at the bottom, as well as square bamboos with thorns 2 cm to 3 cm long growing around its joints. An unidentified species of eagle was also found inside the sinkhole, living in a family, after which the tiankeng was named.
