= Eagle Lake (Carlton County, Minnesota) =

Lake in the state of Minnesota, United States

- Location within Minnesota
- Location: Carlton County, Minnesota
- Coordinates: 46°38′39″N 92°55′02″W
- Type: natural freshwater lake
- Basin countries: United States
- Max. length: 1.69 miles (2.72 km)
- Max. width: 0.43 miles (0.69 km)
- Surface area: 389 acres (157 ha)
- Average depth: 23 feet (7.0 m)
- Max. depth: 35 feet (11 m)
- Surface elevation: 397 feet (121 m)

Eagle Lake is a lake in Carlton County, Minnesota, in the United States.

Eagle Lake was named for the bald eagle native to the region.

== See also ==
- List of lakes in Minnesota
