= Albert Eagle =

Albert Eagle was an English mathematician and philosopher who wrote several books (some of them privately published) giving his forcefully expressed and somewhat eccentric views on science and mathematics.

== Biography ==
He was an assistant to J. J. Thomson, and was later a lecturer at the Victoria University of Manchester. His best-known book is on elliptic functions, where he uses his idiosyncratic mathematical notation, such as τ instead of π/2, and !n for n factorial. In his other writings he dismissed special relativity, quantum mechanics and natural selection as absurdities.

Eagle's book The Philosophy of Religion versus The Philosophy of Science criticizes the theory of relativity and the philosophy of materialism. Eagle was influenced by Henri Bergson and believed that spiritual forces guide evolution (spiritual evolution). Eagle has been described as a pantheist as he held the view that God is the ultimate substance and the world is but a pattern on his surface.

Eagle proposed that man is composed of four substances: the physical body, the non-physical body, the mind of which ideas and memories are gathered and the inner-ego or personality. Eagle believed that the inner-ego, mind and non-physical body survive death into another world.

== Publications ==
- Eagle, Albert (1925), A practical treatise on Fourier's theorem and harmonic analysis for physicists and engineers, Longmans, Green and Co.
- Eagle, Albert (1935), The philosophy of religion versus the philosophy of science: an exposure of the worthlessness and absurdity of some conventional conclusions of modern science, Lowestoft, England: Privately printed. Review
- Eagle, Albert (1938), Difficulties underlying the Einstein-Eddington conception of curved space, Harrison & Sons Ltd.
- Eagle, Albert (1939), "Series for all the roots of a trinomial equation", Amer. Math. Monthly, 46 (7): 422–425, doi:10.2307/2303036, JSTOR 2303036, MR 0000005
- Eagle, Albert (1939), "Series for all the roots of the equation (z−a)^{m}=k(z−b)^{n}", Amer. Math. Monthly, 46 (7): 425–428, doi:10.2307/2303037, JSTOR 2303037, MR 0000006
- Eagle, Albert (1939), "Motion of the Spiral Nebulæ", Nature, 143 (3629): 856, Bibcode:1939Natur.143..856E, doi:10.1038/143856a0, S2CID 4085270
- Eagle, Albert (1954), A modern religious philosophy, World spiritual education series, vol. 2, Voice Publishers
- Eagle, Albert (1955), Literary phonetic English: suggested principles and practice for English spelling reform, A. Eagle
- Eagle, Albert (1958), The elliptic functions as they should be: an account, with applications, of the functions in a new canonical form, Galloway and Porter, Ltd., Cambridge, England, ISBN 9780852500002, MR 0093599, Zbl 0083.07401 Review by Robert Lerner
