= French ship Aigle =

Ships of the French Navy have borne the name Aigle ("eagle"), honouring the bird of prey as well as the symbol of the First French Empire

== Ships named Aigle ==
- Aigle (1692–1712), a 36-gun ship of the line
- Aigle (1704–1710), a fireship
- Aigle (1751–1765), a 50-gun ship of the line
- Aigle (1780-1782), a 16-gun brig, ex-British privateer brig Eagle captured March 1780 at Saint Eustache in the Antilles. Arrived at Lorient January 1782 and listed as a corvette. HMS Duc de Chartres captured Aigle on 9 August 1782 off the American coast.
- Aigle (1781–1784), a lugger
- Aigle (1782), a 40-gun frigate that the British captured in 1782
- Aigle (1783–1788), a barge
- Aigle (1800–1805), a Téméraire-class ship of the line
- Aigle (1805–1814), a landing craft
- Aigle (1813–1814), a xebec
- Aigle (1858), an aviso
- Aigle (1858–1891), an imperial yacht
- Aigle (1916–1919), an auxiliary patrol vessel
- Aigle (1919–1925), a tugboat
- Aigle (1932–1942), a destroyer, lead ship of her class
- L'Aigle (1987–2016), a Tripartite-class minehunter
Ships of the French Navy named Aigle
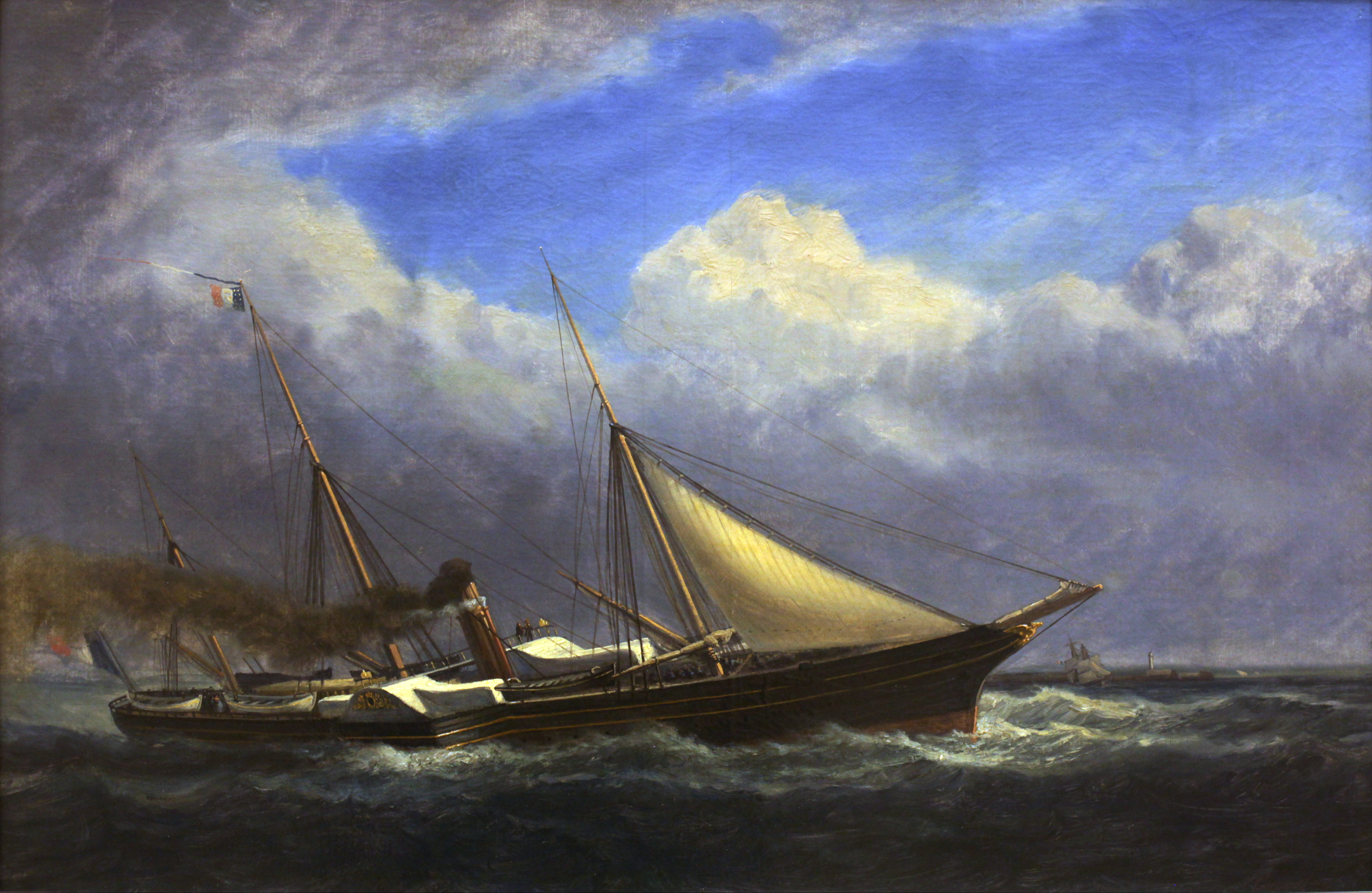
The imperial yacht Aigle (1858–1891)
Painting by Adolphe-Hippolyte Couveley

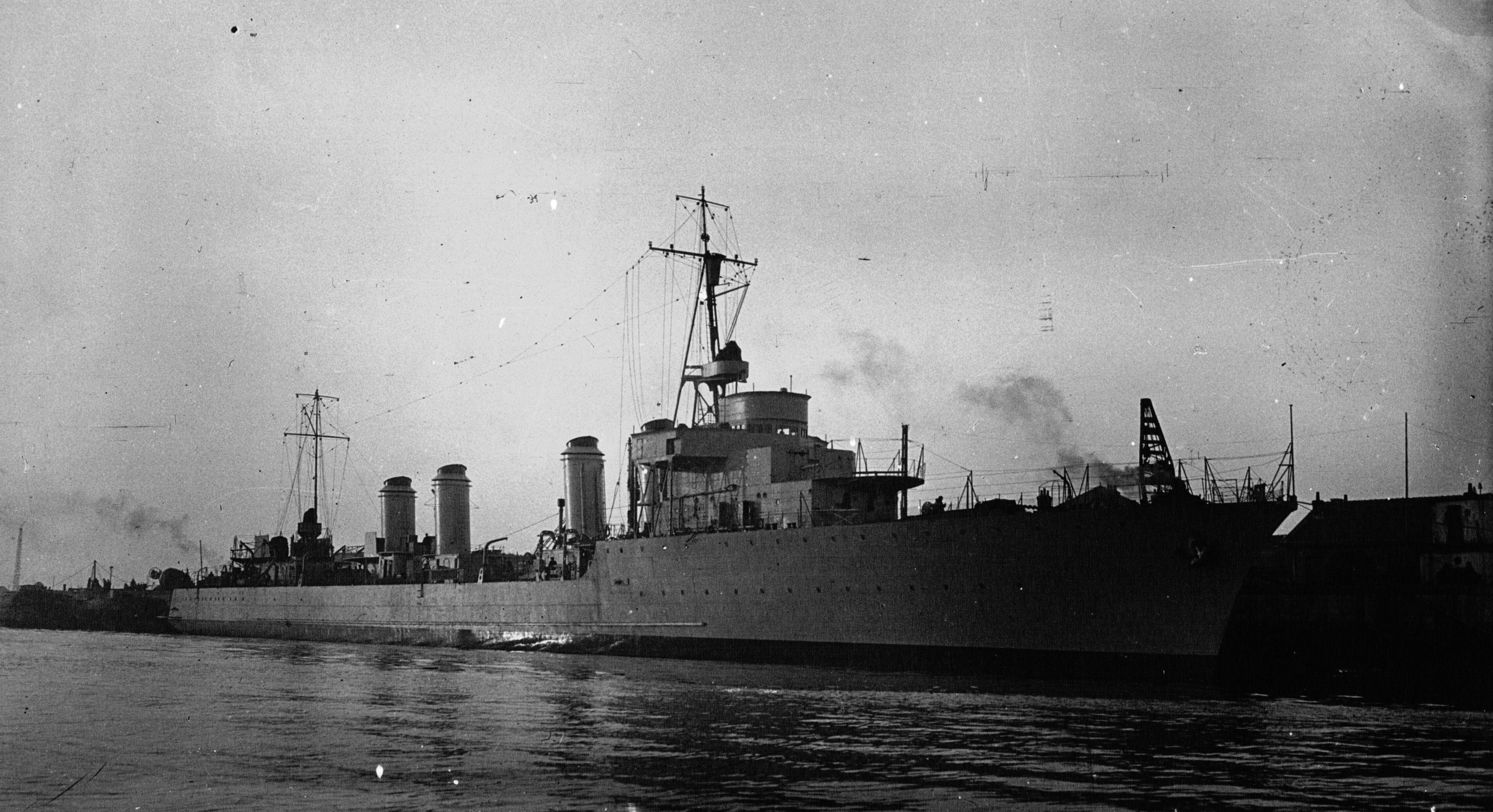
The destroyer Aigle (1932–1942)

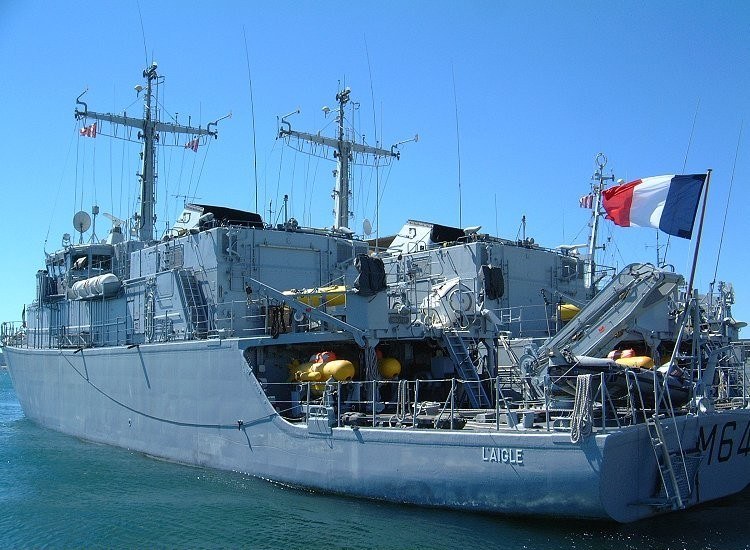
Aigle (1987–2016)

== See also ==
- French ship Aigle d'Or
- French ship Aiglon
- HMS Eagle
