= Eagle Lake (New York) =

Eagle Lake (New York) may refer to the following lakes:

- Eagle Lake (Essex County, New York)
- Eagle Lake (Hamilton County, New York)
- Eagle Lake (Orange County, New York)

== See also ==
- Eagle Lake, New York
