= Eagle (application server) =

Internat application server

EAGLE is a Web-based, mainframe-powered application server which provides direct, secure, high performance Internet access to mainframe computer data and transactions using real-time transaction processing rather than middleware or external gateways.

Originally based in an IBM 3270 environment developed at the University of Florida to reduce the delivery time of student record applications, the engine was configured for the Web in 1996 and removed the need for a screen scraping interface.

== What EAGLE does ==
EAGLE provides direct network access to mainframe data and transactions. Web applications talk directly to native mainframe resources without the complexity or expense of middleware. Non-mainframe resources can be accessed via hooks to customized communication programs, using XML or EDI.

Since EAGLE is itself a mainframe computer transaction, application pages are created internally and delivered via the Web. This reduces overhead compared to external call interfaces resulting in considerable performance gains; during periods of peak demand at the University of Florida, EAGLE routinely handles 400,000 transactions per day while maintaining sub-second response time.

== Session management ==
The Web is defined as a stateless environment—normally, a Web page is requested, the Web page is delivered, and the interaction is over. EAGLE associates pages with a user and handles authentication and authorization. The EAGLE session management engine is protected behind mainframe security.

== Current and Former EAGLE implementations ==
- University of Florida
  - Office of the University Registrar (ISIS and ISISAdmin)
  - Student Financial Affairs
  - Student Activities (Gator Nights)
- Illinois State University
- Shands Health Care
- FACTS.org (Florida Academic Counseling and Tracking for Students)
  - FACTS Central Site was created as an EAGLE application

== EAGLE patent ==
EAGLE was awarded patent 6,532,463 for its state maintenance mechanism.
