= Eagle Lake (Hubbard County, Minnesota) =

Lake in the state of Minnesota, United States

- Location within Minnesota
- Location: Hubbard County, Minnesota
- Coordinates: 47°1′39″N 95°5′55″W
- Type: lake

Eagle Lake is a lake in Hubbard County, in the U.S. state of Minnesota.

Eagle Lake was named for the eagles which nested there.

== See also ==
- List of lakes in Minnesota
