= USS Eaglet =

Patrol vessel of the United States Navy

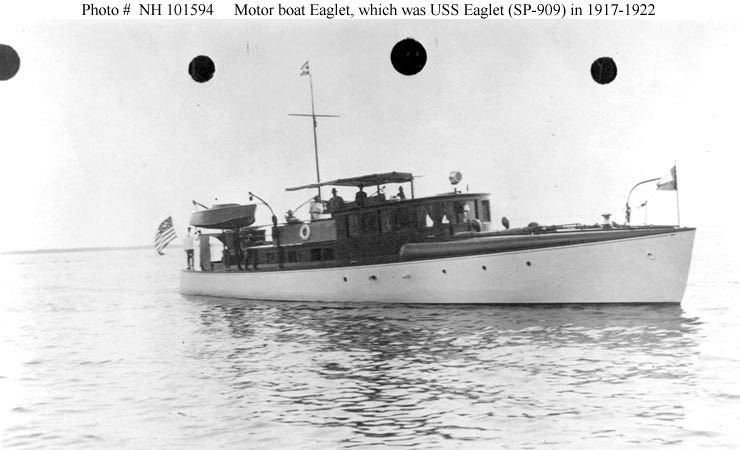
- Eaglet as a civilian motorboat prior to her U.S. Navy service.

History

United States
- Name: USS Eagle
- Namesake: Previous name retained
- Builder: George Lawley & Son
- Completed: 1909 or 1911
- Acquired: 16 June 1917
- Commissioned: 29 June 1917
- Reclassified: District patrol craft, YP-909, in 1920
- Stricken: 12 May 1922
- Fate: Sold 14 July 1921; transaction cancelled; Resold 12 May 1922
- Notes: Operated as private motorboat Eaglet until 1917

General characteristics
- Type: Patrol vessel
- Length: 87 ft 9 in (26.75 m)
- Beam: 15 ft (4.6 m)
- Draft: 4 ft 6 in (1.37 m)
- Speed: 16 knots
- Complement: 11
- Armament: 1 × 1-pounder gun

USS Eaglet (SP-909), later redesignated YP-909, was an armed motorboat that served in the United States Navy as a patrol vessel from 1917 to 1921.

Eaglet was built as a civilian motorboat in either 1909 or 1911 by George Lawley & Son at Neponset, Massachusetts. The U.S. Navy acquired her from her owner, F.L. Budlong of Providence, Rhode Island, on 16 June 1917 for use as a patrol boat during World War I. She was commissioned on 29 June 1917 as USS Eaglet (SP-909).

Eaglet was assigned first to the 2nd Naval District in southern New England and later to the 1st Naval District in northern New England. She was reclassified as a district patrol craft and redesignated YP-909 in 1920.

Eaglet was ordered inspected for sale in January 1921 and ordered sold on 30 March 1921. She was sold on 14 July 1921, but the transaction was cancelled. She was resold on 12 May 1922 and stricken from the Navy List the same day.
