= Boston College Marching Band =

US musical group

The Boston College "Screaming Eagles" Marching Band
- Boston College Marching Band at the 2007 ACC Championship Game
- School: Boston College
- Location: Chestnut Hill, Massachusetts
- Conference: Atlantic Coast Conference
- Founded: 1919
- Director: David Healey
- Members: 220
- Fight song: "For Boston"

Uniform
- Maroon, White, and Gold Instrumentalists: maroon and white jacket with white pants, white gloves, white Drillmasters, and a maroon and white shako with a white plume Visual Teams: maroon leotard, skin-colored tights, dance shoes.
- Website: www.bc.edu/content/bc-web/offices/studentaffairs/sites/BC-Bands/ensembles/marching-band.html

The Boston College Marching Band (BCMB), also known as the Boston College "Screaming Eagles" Marching Band, is the marching band for the Boston College Eagles. Founded in 1919, The Band is the largest and most visible student organization at Boston College, and represents the school at home football games, most bowl games, international events, and parades.

== Band ==
The Boston College Marching Band has about 220 members and is under the direction of David Healey. The Band consists of the following sections: high brass, low brass, woodwinds, battery, front ensemble and dance team. Professional section instructors and student leaders oversee and facilitate all rehearsals and performances. While auditions are not required for instrumentalists, they are required for dance team members.

While most members of the BCMB are students of Boston College, the Band also has a partner-school program, which incorporates a wide variety of students from Boston-based institutions. Prominent schools include Berklee College of Music, Emerson College, Emmanuel College, Northeastern University, Simmons College, Suffolk University, Massachusetts Institute of Technology and Wentworth Institute of Technology. All Boston area college students can join the Band.

A Boston College Marching Band drum major conducting on the field

The Band performs two different half-time shows a year in the drum and bugle corps style of marching. These halftime shows, which are approximately 6 minutes in length, typically consist of 30-40 sets. The Band also performs in the stands during the game.

== Music and performances ==
The Band performs at all home football games, parades in the Boston area, and away games each season, with the exception of 2009 (see below). Regular season destinations have included University of Maryland, Clemson University, and University of Southern California. Postseason travel has taken the Band to Jacksonville, Florida for the ACC Championship Game, Orlando, Florida for the Champs Sports Bowl, New York City for the Pinstripe Bowl, Shreveport, Louisiana for the Advocare v100 Bowl, Dublin, Ireland for the Emerald Isle Classic and Yokohama, Japan for the Yokohama Bowl.

In the 2010, 2011, and 2012 seasons, the Band traveled to Canada to perform a pre-game and halftime routine for the Montreal Alouettes. The Band has also had the opportunity to perform with the Boston Pops Orchestra at the annual Pops on the Heights concert.

Three hours before kickoff, the Boston College Marching Band parades through Lower Campus and leads the football team into Alumni Stadium. Afterward, The Band performs a short concert on the steps of Silvio O. Conte Forum.

Before the football game starts, the Marching Band performs a pregame show. Pregame starts with a high-brass fanfare, performed by the trumpets and mellophones. The Band then prances out onto the field and performs a series of BC fight songs. First, the Band performs "Sons of Maroon and Gold", "All Up For Boston," and "Shipping Up To Boston." The Band then salutes the opposing team by playing their fight song. The Band then performs the nation's oldest fight song, "For Boston." During "For Boston," the Band forms the letters "BC" on the field, and during the final phrases, "italicizes" the letters to match the school's logo.

In the stands, the Band plays a variety of music. After every first down, the Band plays a short, 4-bar fanfare similar to "Sweep Down the Field," another BC fight song. The Band plays numerous cheers, such as "E-A-G-L-E-S," and "Booty Drop". The Band also performs versions of Neil Diamond's "Sweet Caroline" and The Foundations' "Build Me Up Buttercup," both of which have become traditions at Boston College.

Current staff of the band include: Brian Shanbrun-Woodwinds, Eric Goode-Low Brass, Mark Soo-High Brass, Simon Mazzoli-Percussion, Sanjay Pamaar-Percussion Assistant, Dan Salant-Front Ensemble, and Daria Healey-Dance Team.

Additionally, the Band has performed the national anthem at Fenway Park, and on June 16, 2009 the Band opened for Aerosmith and the Dropkick Murphys at the Comcast Center in Mansfield, Massachusetts. The Band also performed "I'm Shipping Up to Boston" live onstage with the Dropkick Murphys at the Bank of America Pavilion in Boston on September 21, 2012.

The Band was also selected to perform at the Second inauguration of Barack Obama in Washington, DC on January 21, 2013.
