= Eagle Township, Barber County, Kansas =

Eagle Township
- Township
- Location in Barber County
- Coordinates: 37°12′20″N 098°41′16″W
- Country: United States
- State: Kansas
- County: Barber

Area
  - Total: 111.87 sq mi (289.73 km^{2})
  - Land: 111.82 sq mi (289.62 km^{2})
  - Water: 0.042 sq mi (0.11 km^{2}) 0.04%
- Elevation: 1,703 ft (519 m)

Population (2000)
  - Total: 42
  - Density: 0.26/sq mi (0.1/km^{2})
- GNIS feature ID: 0470475

Eagle Township is a township in Barber County, Kansas, United States. As of the 2000 census, its population was 42.

== Geography ==
Eagle Township covers an area of 111.87 square miles (289.7 km^{2}) and contains no incorporated settlements. According to the USGS, it contains one cemetery, Lodi.

The streams of East Cedar Creek, Pump Creek, Salt Fork Arkansas River, Salty Creek and West Cedar Creek run through this township.
