= Airtrike Eagle 5 =

German ultralight trike

Eagle 5

General information
- Type: Ultralight trike
- National origin: Germany
- Manufacturer: Airtrike
- Status: Production completed (2017)

The Airtrike Eagle 5 is a German ultralight trike, that was designed and produced by Airtrike of Berlin. When it was in production the aircraft was supplied as a complete ready-to-fly-aircraft.

The manufacturer entered liquidation on 1 January 2017.

== Design and development ==
The Eagle was designed to comply with the Fédération Aéronautique Internationale microlight category, including the category's maximum gross weight of 450 kg (992 lb). The aircraft has a maximum gross weight of 450 kg (992 lb). It features a cable-braced hang glider-style high-wing, weight-shift controls, a two-seats-in-tandem open cockpit, tricycle landing gear with wheel pants and a single engine in pusher configuration.

The aircraft is made from bolted-together aluminium tubing, with its fuselage made predominately from composites and with its double surface wing covered in Dacron sailcloth. Its 9.8 m (32.2 ft) span Hazard 12S wing is attached by lift struts to its "A" frame weight-shift control bar. The standard powerplant is an air-cooled, four-stroke, 90 hp (67 kW) BMW motorcycle engine. Optional powerplants include the four cylinder, air and liquid-cooled, four-stroke, dual-ignition 80 hp (60 kW) Rotax 912 engine and the in-house designed Airtrike 850ti 120 hp (89 kW) engine. The aircraft has an empty weight of 215 kg (474 lb) and with its gross weight of 450 kg (992 lb) has a useful load of 235 kg (518 lb). With full fuel of 65 litres (14 imp gal; 17 US gal) the payload is 168 kg (370 lb).

A number of different wings can be fitted to the basic carriage, including the strut-braced Hazard 12S and several Aeros wings.

== Specifications (Eagle 5) ==
Data from Bayerl

General characteristics

- Crew: one
- Capacity: one passenger
- Wing area: 12 m^{2} (130 sq ft)
- Empty weight: 215 kg (474 lb)
- Gross weight: 450 kg (992 lb)
- Fuel capacity: 65 litres (14 imp gal; 17 US gal)
- Powerplant: 1 × BMW air-cooled, four stroke motorcycle engine, 67 kW (90 hp)
- Propellers: 3-bladed composite

Performance

- Maximum speed: 150 km/h (93 mph, 81 kn)
- Cruise speed: 120 km/h (75 mph, 65 kn)
- Stall speed: 55 km/h (34 mph, 30 kn)
- Rate of climb: 4.6 m/s (910 ft/min)
- Wing loading: 37.5 kg/m^{2} (7.7 lb/sq ft)
