= Russians in the United Kingdom =

Ethnic group

Total population
- Russian-born residents in the United Kingdom: 59,781 (2021/22 Census) (Note: Does not include ethnic Russians born in the United Kingdom or those with Russian ancestry); England: 55,014 (2021); Scotland: 3,184 (2022); Wales: 1,039 (2021); Northern Ireland: 544 (2021); Previous estimates: 15,160 (2001 census); 39,529 (2011 census); 73,000 (2020 ONS estimate)

Regions with significant populations
- London, South East England, Edinburgh, Glasgow, Aberdeen, Cardiff

Languages
- British English and Russian

Religion
- Russian Orthodox Church; Atheism; Irreligion; Judaism; Church of England

Related ethnic groups
- Russian diaspora

Russians in the United Kingdom are Russians or individuals born in the Russian Empire, Soviet Union or Russian Federation, who are citizens or residents of the United Kingdom.

== History ==
After the abolition of slavery, Catholic emancipation and Jewish emancipation in the early 19th century, Britain came to be seen in Europe as a liberal destination, attracting free thinkers who were considered dangerous by the monarchies of continental Europe. Alexander Herzen, a writer considered to be the "father of Russian socialism", lived in London for 13 years. He established the first Russian-language printing house outside Russia Free Russian Press, first at Judd Street and later moving to the Caledonian Road. Herzen's most influential publication, devised with the help of another Russian immigrant poet Nikolai Ogarev, was Kolokol newsletter. Notable Russian anarchists Peter Kropotkin and Mikhail Bakunin lived and worked in London in the late 19th century. Freedom Press anarchist publishing house co-founded by Kropotkin in Whitechapel still operates as of 2022.

Due to the political freedom in Britain, London became central to the Russian revolutionary thinkers once again in the 20th century. Vladimir Lenin lived in London in 1902–1903, publishing a revolutionary journal Iskra in a building in Clerkenwell that later became a home of the Marx Memorial Library. The congress of Russian revolutionaries held in the Three Johns pub in Islington in 1903 became a critical point of division of the movement to hardline Bolsheviks, who would later establish the Soviet Union, and Mensheviks. The 1907 Bolshevik party congress was held in Hackney and was attended by future leaders of the Bolshevik revolution including, besides Lenin, Leon Trotsky, Joseph Stalin, Grigory Zinoviev, Lev Kamenev, Maxim Litvinov and writer Maxim Gorky. In the initial years following the October Revolution, the nature of Russian immigration to the UK underwent a significant transformation. While Britain continued to serve as a sanctuary for those unable to remain in Russia, anti-monarchists were succeeded by white émigrés, who represented a broad range of political beliefs. Britain admitted an estimated 15,000 refugees, a relatively low figure compared to countries such as France or Germany, as asylum was granted only under exceptional circumstances. Some individuals such as Grand Duchess Xenia were evacuated aboard HMS Marlborough in 1919, sent by King George V to protect his relatives.

Emigrant authors such as Ariadna Tyrkova-Williams contributed to documenting the contemporary life in England, writing for Russian magazines and newspapers.

Vladimir Nabokov's three-year stay in Cambridge as a student had a profound influence on his literary work. The author recounted his experiences in England in "Speak, Memory" and "Other Shores", with Cambridge providing the backdrop for his novels Glory and The Real Life of Sebastian Knight. Yevgeny Zamyatin's time in Britain during World War I, spent as a naval architect on secondment, formed the basis for the works he wrote during his stay and upon his return to Russia. The concepts and symbolism in his dystopian novel We were rooted in his experiences in England and his familiarity with English literature. The novel subsequently influenced George Orwell's Nineteen Eighty-Four and possibly Aldous Huxley's Brave New World.

== Jewish emigration ==
Russian Jews emigrated to the United Kingdom beginning in the late 19th century to seek refuge from the persecution in Russian Empire and Eastern Europe. It's estimated that 150,000 Jewish people relocated to Britain between 1881 and 1914. Slonim-born Michael Marks settled in Leeds where he co-founded Marks & Spencer retail chain in 1894. Isaac Moses and his brother founded Moss Bros Group in Houndsditch. Montague Burton, then known as Montague Ossinsky, came to England from Lithuania, founding Burton in Sheffield in 1904, opening shops in Chesterfield, Manchester, Leeds and Mansfield within a year. Burton became the biggest retail empire in Europe by 1925.

The production of ready-made coats and jackets became the primary immigrant trade due to the combination of Jews facing restrictions on skilled trades in Russia and the abundant unskilled labor force in Britain. The number of Russian and Polish tailors increased from 3,264 in 1881 to 19,218 in 1901. Facing language barrier and unable to work on Saturdays for religious reasons, they were often employed by the London's East End sweatshops run by Jewish entrepreneurs. Jewish immigrants to London built a thriving clothes trade in Houndsditch and Petticoat Lane.

The hardships prompted some Jews to become revolutionaries. A pioneer of Jewish socialism Aaron Liebermann came to London from Saint Petersburg in 1875. He organised the first Jewish worker's organisation Hebrew Socialist Union in London, however, the initiative wasn't supported by the Jewish establishment and the socialist organisation was short-lived. Morris Winchevsky, who moved to London from Lithuania, published a socialist Yiddish newspaper Der Poylisher Yidl from the premises in Commercial Street.

Biochemist Chaim Weizmann came to Britain from Russia in 1904. He developed a method of producing cordite explosive that was essential to the Britain's World War I effort. His industrial success resulted in meeting then Foreign Secretary Arthur Balfour and he is believed to have influenced Balfour Declaration, which led to the creation of Israel.

While earlier waves of immigration from Russia primarily consisted of political exiles, who were intent on continuing their activities in their new country, the migration of refugees from the Russian Pale of Settlement marked a significantly larger-scale movement. Eastern European Jewish immigration largely ceased following the passage of the Aliens Act 1905.

== Demographics ==
The 2001 UK census recorded 15,160 residents born in Russia. The 2011 census recorded 36,313 people born in Russia resident in England, 687 in Wales, 2,180 in Scotland and 349 in Northern Ireland.

The Office for National Statistics estimates that 73,000 people born in Russia were resident in the UK in 2020. Estimates published by The Guardian suggest that the resident population of London born in Russia was over 150,000 in 2014. The rise in population has led to jocular nicknames for London such as "Londongrad" and "Moscow-on-the-Thames".

== Russian schools ==
In London, in particular Notting Hill Gate there are a number of Russian schools aimed at transmitting Russian language and culture to the children of Russian immigrant parents.

The Russian Embassy School in London is a Russian international school in the UK's capital city.

== Notable people ==
This is a list of Russian expatriates in the United Kingdom and Britons of Russian ancestry.

=== Arts ===
- Stella Arbenina, actress
- Sir Misha Black, designer
- Serge Chermayeff, architect
- Sergei Fyodorov, icon painter
- Theodore Komisarjevsky, theatrical director and designer
- Lilia Kopylova, dancer
- Andrew Garfield, actor
- Alan Keith (born Alexander Kossoff), broadcaster
- David Kossoff, actor
- Paul Kossoff, blues guitarist
- Berthold Lubetkin, architect
- Nikolai Medtner, pianist and composer
- Helen Mirren (born Helen Mironoff), actress
- Viktoria Mullova, violinist
- Seva Novgorodsev, radio presenter
- Olga Novikoff, writer and journalist
- Oxxxymiron, rap singer.
- Sergei Pavlenko, portrait painter
- Oda Slobodskaya, opera singer
- Sir Peter Ustinov, actor, writer and raconteur
- Jonas Blue, Singer

=== Business ===
- Boris Berezovsky, businessman
- Evgeny Chichvarkin, entrepreneur
- Evgeny Lebedev, businessman
- Vladimir Raitz, founder of the Horizon Holiday Group

=== Military and espionage ===
- Vladimir Peniakoff, Lieutenant-Colonel of the British Army, Distinguished Service Order, Military Cross
- Pavel Chichagov, Commander and an Admiral of the Imperial Russian Navy under Alexander I. The son of the son of Admiral Vasili Chichagov and his English wife.
- Rudolf Abel, Soviet spy during the Cold War, born in Newcastle-upon-Tyne as Vilyam Genrikhovich Fisher.
- Oleg Gordievsky, former senior Soviet intelligence officer
- Alexander Litvinenko, British naturalised Russian defector and former officer of the Russian FSB secret service who specialised in tackling organised crime.
- Sergei Skripal, former Russian military intelligence officer who acted as a double agent for the UK's intelligence services.

=== Science and humanities ===
- Isaiah Berlin, renowned social and political theorist, and historian
- Konstantin Novoselov, Nobel Prize-winning physicist
- Andre Geim, Nobel Prize-winning physicist
- Vladimir Korenchevsky, pharmacologist
- Dimitri Obolensky, historian
- Alexandra Tolstoy, businesswoman, fellow of the Royal Geographical Society
- Nikolai Tolstoy, historian
- Boris Uvarov, entomologist
- Paul Vinogradoff, historian-medievalist
- Nadia Waloff, entomologist
- Nicholas Zernov, Orthodox theologian

=== Sports ===
- Marfa Ekimova, rhythmic gymnast
- Alexander Obolensky, international rugby union player

== Monuments ==
This is a list of monuments to Russians in the United Kingdom.

=== 19th century ===
- The Emperor Fountain, grounds of Chatsworth House, Derbyshire – constructed in anticipation of the 1844 visit of Nicholas I
- Hoy monument, Isle of Wight – commemorates the visit of Alexander I of Russia to Great Britain in 1814
- Russian Memorial, Lewes

=== Second World War ===
- Tempsford Memorial, Bedfordshire – memorial to women who served as secret agents in occupied Europe during the Second World War, including four Soviet NKVD agents
- Twelve Responses to Tragedy, South Kensington – commemorates people forcibly repatriated to the Soviet Union and Yugoslavia as a result of the Yalta Conference at the conclusion of the Second World War.

=== Personal monuments ===
- Statue of Yuri Gagarin, Greenwich
- Vladimir Lenin Bust, Islington – commissioned by the UK Government during the war in tribute to the efforts of the Soviet Union. It was placed in Holford Square (briefly Lenin's home when he lived in London) and unveiled in 1942. It was a supposed focal point of a new housing development to be named 'Lenin Court' although the choice of Lenin proved unpopular with the local community and the bust was frequently daubed with anti-communist slogans. Architect Berthold Lubetkin had the bust removed and when the housing development was completed in the late 1940s, it was renamed 'Bevin Court'. The bust was displayed in Islington Town Hall for many years and is now on permanent display in the Islington Museum.
- Carved portrait of Dmitri Mendeleev on the Imperial Chemical House façade, Millbank
- Statue of Peter the Great, Deptford

== See also ==
- Little Russia, London
- Other White
- Russian money in London
- Russian oligarchs
- Russia–United Kingdom relations
- Ukrainians in the United Kingdom
