= Joseph Elijah Triwosch =

Russian writer

- Born: 18 January 1856; Vilna, Vilna Governorate, Russian Empire
- Died: 1940 (aged 83–84)
- Writing career
- Language: Hebrew

Joseph Elijah Triwosch (Yiddish: יוסף אליהו טריוואש; 18 January 1856 – 1940) was Russian Hebrew writer, poet, translator, and biblical commentator.

Triwosch was born in Vilna, and settled at Grodno as a teacher of Hebrew and Russian. His literary activity began in 1873, in which year he published in Ha-Levanon his first articles. Most of his novels, representing Jewish life in Russia, were published in various periodicals. They include Toḥelet nikzabah and Ha-lito'i, in Ha-Shaḥar; Bi-mekom zava'ah, in Ha-Karmel; and Al shete ha-se'ippim, in Ha-Asif. Among his other publications were Dor tahapukot (Warsaw, 1881), which describes the activity of the Russian Social-Democrats, Din ve-ḥeshbon (1895), and Pesi'ot ketanot (1904). He also translated various works of literature into Hebrew, including War and Peace and Anna Karenina, published an anthology of medieval Hebrew literature (1925), and co-edited the Mikra Meforash series.
