= Israel Frenkel =

- ישראל פרענקעל
- Born: 18 September 1853; Radom, Russian Poland
- Died: 1890 (aged 36–37)
- Spouse: Shprintze Kirschenbaum (m. 1872)
- Writing career
- Language: Hebrew
- Literary movement: Haskalah

Israel Frenkel (Hebrew: ישראל פרענקעל; 18 September 1853 – 1890) was a Polish-Jewish Hebraist, translator, and educator.

== Biography ==
Frenkel was born in Radom, Poland in 1853. His mother, Neḥama née Potashnik, was a descendant of Yaakov Yitzḥak of Lublin, and his father, Shraga Frenkel, came from a scholarly Hasidic family.

He studied Talmudic literature under Rabbi Samuel Mohilever, at the same time studying Hebrew, German, and French. An early member of the Hibbat Zion movement, Frenkel became close friends with Mohilever, as well as with Haim Yehiel Bornstein and Nahum Sokolow. he founded a Talmud Torah in Radom in 1882, which emphasized the study of both Judaic and secular subjects.

His translations into Hebrew include Gotthold Ephraim Lessing's drama Miss Sara Sampson, under the title Sara bat Shimshon (Warsaw, 1887); the songs in metric verse in David Radner's translation of Schiller's Wilhelm Tell (Vilna, 1878); and Stanisław Gabriel Kozłowski's drama Esterka, under the title Masʾa Ester (Warsaw, 1889), the heroine of which is Esterka, the mythical Jewish mistress of Casimir III the Great. Frenkel was also regular contributor to Ha-Tsfira, Ha-Shaḥar, Ha-Melitz, Ha-Maggid, and other Maskilic publications.

He died at age 37 during the 1889–1890 flu pandemic. His son Yechiel Frenkel would become a prominent writer and Zionist activist.

== Partial bibliography ==
- Kozłowski, Stanisław Gabriel (1889). "Masʾa Ester: ḥizayon be-shesh maʿarkhot yesodoto be-divrei ha-yamim me-et ha-sofer ha-polani Kozlovski" [Esther’s Burden: A spectacle in six acts, based on the history by the Polish writer Kozłowski]. Ha-Asif (in Hebrew). 5. Translated by Frenkel, Israel: 1–108.
- Lessing, Gotthold Ephraim (1887). Sara bat Shimshon [Miss Sara Sampson]. Translated by Frenkel, Israel. Warsaw.
