= Richard Marner =

British actor (1921–2004)

- Born: Alexander Pavlovich Molchanoff; 27 March 1921; Petrograd, Russia
- Died: 18 March 2004 (aged 82); Perth, Scotland
- Education: Monmouth School
- Occupation: Actor
- Years active: 1950–2002
- Spouse: Pauline Pfarr (m. 1947)
- Children: 1
- Relatives: Olga Novikoff (grandmother)
- Military career
- Allegiance: United Kingdom
- Branch: Royal Air Force
- Unit: Air Training Corps
- Conflicts: World War II

Richard Marner (born Alexander Pavlovich Molchanoff; (Note: Russian: Александр Павлович Молчанов, romanized: Aleksandr Pavlovich Molchanov.) 27 March 1921 – 18 March 2004) was a Russian-British actor. He was best known for his role as Colonel Kurt von Strohm on the British World War II sitcom 'Allo 'Allo! (1982–1992).

== Early life ==
Born in Petrograd, Russia (now St. Petersburg), Molchanoff (nicknamed "Sasha" by his family) was the eldest son of Colonel Pavel Molchanoff, of the Semyonovsky Regiment, one of two that were set up for children of children who had played with Peter I of Russia. In 1924, his entire family left the Soviet Union and went to Finland and then Germany, before ending up in Britain and London, where Alexander's grandmother, author Olga Novikoff (known in the family as "Babushka London") lived in Harley Street.

After being educated at Monmouth School in Wales, Molchanoff became an assistant to the Russian tenor Vladimir Rosing, where he performed at Covent Garden. During World War II, he joined the RAF, and was posted to South Africa with the Air Training Corps. After being invalided out, he changed his name to Richard Marner and began his long and successful career as an actor.

== Career ==
One of Marner's early stage roles – as Count Dracula, with Howard Dean – is still regarded by some as the definitive interpretation of the role. In 1967, well before his role as the German Colonel in 'Allo 'Allo! (1982–92), Marner played the minor and uncredited role of a German sentry in the classic war film The Dirty Dozen. His other films include Ice Cold in Alex, The One That Got Away, The Password Is Courage, You Only Live Twice, The Boys from Brazil, The Spy Who Came in from the Cold, The African Queen and the Swiss film Four in a Jeep, in which he did all the Russian dialogue. He was also in the television movie Birth of the Beatles, as Bruno Koschmider.

Marner's best known role was in 'Allo 'Allo! as German Commandant Colonel Kurt Von Strohm. He appeared in all nine series of the programme between 1984 and 1992. He also appeared in an episode of Secret Army, the programme that 'Allo 'Allo! parodies.

An early TV role was his 1960 appearance in Danger Man in the first season episode entitled "The Girl in the Pink Pyjamas" as an anaesthetist.

His other work included roles in The Protectors (1973), Mackenzie (1980), Triangle (1981), Lovejoy (1994), and the film The Sum of All Fears (as the Russian president). He also starred in the stage farce A Bedfull of Foreigners at the Ashcroft Theatre (1974). He played a disgruntled father in the Gorbachev Pizza Hut commercial, starring the last leader of the Soviet Union, Mikhail Gorbachev.

== Personal life and death ==
Marner married Pauline Pfarr in London in 1947. In 1958, the couple had a daughter together. After 2002, the couple first retired to Kentford, near Newmarket in Suffolk, before moving to a cottage in Perthshire in 2003.

He was fluent in four languages: Russian, English, German, and French.

In 1991, when the President of Russia, Boris Yeltsin, convened a "Congress of Compatriots" (an olive branch to some of the post-1917 White Russian diaspora), Marner was one of the 600 people who returned to the motherland. Despite being caught up in an attempted coup, he stayed long enough to watch, through tearful eyes, the raising of the first Imperial Russian flag flown in Moscow since 1917.

=== Death ===
Marner died on 18 March 2004 in Perth, Scotland, aged 82 from bronchopneumonia. His widow died on 21 May 2009, aged 91.

== Selected filmography ==
- Highly Dangerous (1950) – Soldier on Train (uncredited)
- Lilli Marlene (1951) – SS Colonel
- Appointment with Venus (1951) – 2nd German Corporal
- The African Queen (1951) – Second Officer of Fort Shona
- Top Secret (1952) – Russian Sentry
- Never Let Me Go (1953) – Toasting Russian Officer (uncredited)
- Park Plaza 605 (1953) – Barkov
- Mask of Dust (1954) – Hans Brecht – racer
- Oh... Rosalinda!! (1955) – Col. Lebotov
- The Master Plan (1955) – Man (uncredited)
- The Man Who Knew Too Much (1956) – Aide to Prime Minister (uncredited)
- Reach for the Sky (1956) – German Officer in Staff Car (uncredited)
- Ill Met by Moonlight (1957) – German Officer with Gen. Brauer (uncredited)
- Seven Thunders - German Soldier (uncredited)
- Miracle in Soho (1957) – Karl
- The One That Got Away (1957) – German Prisoner
- The Safecracker (1958) – German N.C.O
- No Time to Die (1958) – German colonel
- Ice Cold in Alex (1958) – German Guard
- The Inn of the Sixth Happiness (1958) – Russian Soldier (uncredited)
- The Square Peg (1958) – Hauptmann Schmidt (uncredited)
- A Touch of Larceny (1959) – Russian Officer Cornered by Max Easton (uncredited)
- Beyond the Curtain (1960) – Russian Officer (uncredited)
- Circle of Deception (1960) – German colonel
- Very Important Person (1961) – German Guard (uncredited)
- Invasion Quartet (1961) – German Soldier (uncredited)
- The Pursuers (1961) – Aranson
- The Password Is Courage (1962) – Schmidt
- The Mouse on the Moon (1963) – Russian Air Force General
- Children of the Damned (1964) – Russian Embassy official (uncredited)
- Ring of Spies (1964) – Colonel Monat (uncredited)
- Operation Crossbow (1965) – SS Sergeant (uncredited)
- The Spy Who Came In from the Cold (1965) – Vopo Captain
- Where the Spies Are (1966) – Josef
- You Only Live Twice (1967) – Russian Controller (uncredited)
- The Dirty Dozen (1967) – German Sentry at Chateau (uncredited)
- Isadora (1968) – (uncredited)
- Le silencieux (1973)
- Tiffany Jones (1973) – Vorjak
- QB VII (1974) – Wladislaw Kranz
- The Internecine Project (1974) – German delegate
- The Girl from Petrovka (1974) – Kremlin Press Official
- Not Now, Comrade (1976) – Russian
- The Boys from Brazil (1978) – Emil Doring
- Avalanche Express (1979) – Field Marshal Prachko
- Birth of the Beatles (1979) – Club Boss
- The Last Horror Film (1982) – Screening Room Jury
- Nutcracker (1983) – Popov
- Pandora's Clock (1996)
- The Sum of All Fears (2002) – President Zorkin (final film role)
