= HaKarmel =

Hebrew periodical

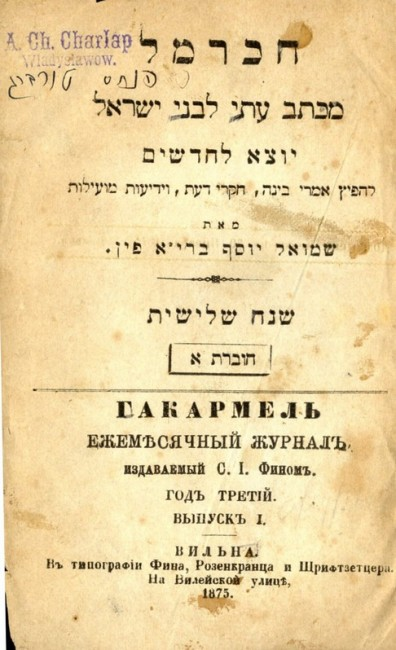
- Cover of volume 3, issue 1 (1875)
- Editor: Samuel Joseph Fuenn
- Frequency: Weekly (1860–1871); Monthly (1871–1880)
- First issue: June 26, 1860
- Final issue: December 1880
- Based in: Vilna, Vilna Governorate, Russian Empire
- Language: Hebrew
- Website: nli.org.il/en/newspapers/hcl
- OCLC: 1167629371

HaKarmel (Hebrew: הַכַּרְמֶל, lit. 'The Carmel') was a Hebrew periodical, edited and published by Samuel Joseph Fuenn in Vilna from 1860 to 1880. It was one of the important forces of the Haskalah movement in the Russian Empire.

== History ==
HaKarmel was founded by Samuel Joseph Fuenn in 1860 as a weekly, and was continued as such (with some interruptions) until 1871. Eight volumes appeared in these eleven years, of which volumes 1–3 have supplements in Russian. It then became a monthly, of which four volumes appeared from 1871 to 1880, when the publication was suspended. Ḥayyim Leib Katzenellenbogen was associated with Fuenn in the editorship. Ḥayyim Leib Markon later assisted Fuenn in the same capacity.

HaKarmel was more of a literary periodical and less of a newspaper than other Hebrew contemporaries like HaMaggid or HaMelitz, in part because the license granted by the Tsarist regime prohibited Fuenn from publishing articles on politics. The periodical contained poetry, translations, historical material, literary criticism, Torah scholarship, and book reviews.

== Notable contributors ==
- Reuben Asher Braudes
- Judah Leib Gordon
- Avrom Ber Gotlober
- Isaac Kaminer
- Avraham Uri Kovner
