= Der Poylisher Yidl =

British Yiddish-language socialist newspaper

- Founded: 25 July 1884
- Ceased publication: 1885
- Political alignment: Anarchist
- Language: Yiddish
- Headquarters: London, UK

The Der Poylisher Yidl (Yiddish: דער פוילישער אידעל, The Little Polish Jew) was one of the first socialist periodicals in the Yiddish language and Britain's first socialist paper targeting an immigrant audience. It was founded on 25 July 1884 by socialist Morris Winchevsky and his friend, writer Eliyahu Wolf Rabinowitz. It featured poetry (mostly Winchevsky's), transatlantic Jewish news and critiques of the local Yiddish theatre (including Sarah and Jacob Adler's troupe). Its writing style was inspired by Aaron Liebermann (who established London's Hebrew Socialist Union), combining international commentary with local community organising. It sold for 1 penny per issue. In 1892, it was renamed to Di Tsukunft (Yiddish: די צוקונפֿט, The Future).

The newspaper ceased publication after less than a year, due to ideological differences. Winchevsky, who was staunchly anti-religious, left because Rabbinowitch accepted an advertisement from Samual Montagu, who was a pillar of the religious community. Winchevsky went on to co-found the Arbeter Fraynd, which regularly criticised Montague and Britain's Chief Rabbi Herman Adler.

The newspaper struggled to gain traction and published a total of 16 issues. It was quickly overtaken by the Arbeter Fraynd. The Jewish scene in London in general suffered from factionalism. The prevalence of anarchists meant Russia was not interested in supporting them. Most radical Jews ended up in New York City, including the paper's founder Morris Winchevsky.

The paper claimed to "treat the Jew... as a man... as a Jew... as a worker" and listed four kinds of Jews: "The 'indifferent' care only about themselves; 'assimilationists' consider Jewish separateness to be the root of Jewish troubles; 'nationalists' blame the Jews' homelessness for their sufferings; 'socialists' consider the Jewish problem to be part of the general social problem, not one apart".

== See also ==
- List of left-wing publications in the United Kingdom
