= Jacob Hirsch Sperling =

Jacob Hirsch Sperling Maskilic poet

Jacob Hirsch Sperling (Hebrew: יעקב צבי שפרלינג; 1837, Lemberg – December 1899, Lemberg) was a Galician Jewish Maskilic poet and educator.

Sperling was a teacher of religion at the Jewish school and the German gymnasium in Lemberg. He contributed to the Hebrew periodicals Shomer Tzion, Kokebe Yiẓḥaḳ, Ha-Ivri, Ha-Shaḥar, and Otzar ha-Sifrut, was co-editor of the Jüdische Presse and the Neuzeit, and was the founder of the societies Aḥavah ve-Haskalah and Shomer Yisrael in Lemberg. In addition to minor writings he has published Hatzalat Melekh (Lemberg, 1854), a poem on the occasion of Emperor Franz Joseph's escape from an assassin; "Ḥamishshah Ketarim" (Lemberg, 1871), containing five poems; "Ḥokhmat Shelomoh" (Lemberg, 1878), a biography, in verse, of S. L. Rapoport; and "Hordos," an epic poem in five cantos (published in Otzar ha-Sifrut, 1887).
