= Kaminer =

Kaminer is a surname. Notable people with the surname include:

- Isaac Kaminer (1834–1901), Russian poet, satirist, and physician
- Manó Kertész Kaminer, best known as Michael Curtiz (1886–1962), Hungarian-American film director
- Joe Kaminer (born 1934), South African rugby union player
- Wendy Kaminer (born 1949), American feminist and human rights activist and lawyer
- Wladimir Kaminer (born 1967), Russian-born German writer
