= Radnor =

Radnor may refer to:

== Places ==
=== United Kingdom ===
- Radnor, Cheshire, a former civil parish in England, formerly in Astbury
- Radnor, Cornwall, England
- Radnorshire, a county of Wales until 1974 and a district of Powys from 1974-1996, commonly known as Radnor
- New Radnor, a village in Powys, Wales
- Old Radnor, a town in Powys, Wales
- Radnor Forest, a rock dome in Mid Wales

=== United States ===
- Radnor, Indiana
- Radnor, Ohio
- Radnor, Pennsylvania
- Radnor Lake State Natural Area, Nashville, Tennessee

== People with the surname ==
- Helen Radnor (1846-1929), British composer and conductor
- Josh Radnor (born 1974), American actor

== Other uses ==
- Earl of Radnor, an English peerage
- Hill Radnor, a breed of domestic sheep
- Radnor, a fictional character in the strategy game Dune II
- Radnor Drinks, a Welsh brand of bottled drinks famous for their school-compliant soft drinks.

== See also ==
- Radnor Township (disambiguation)
- Radner
