= Radner =

Radner is an English or German surname. Notable people with the surname include:

- David Radner (1848–1901), Lithuanian Jewish translator
- Gilda Radner (1946–1989), American comedian and actress
- Maria Radner (1981–2015), German opera singer and passenger on Germanwings Flight 9525
- Roy Radner (1927-2022), American economist and business professor
- Sidney Hollis Radner (1919-2011), American magician

== See also ==
- Radnor (disambiguation)
