= Ze'ev Yavetz =

Polish-Jewish historian, teacher and Hebrew linguist

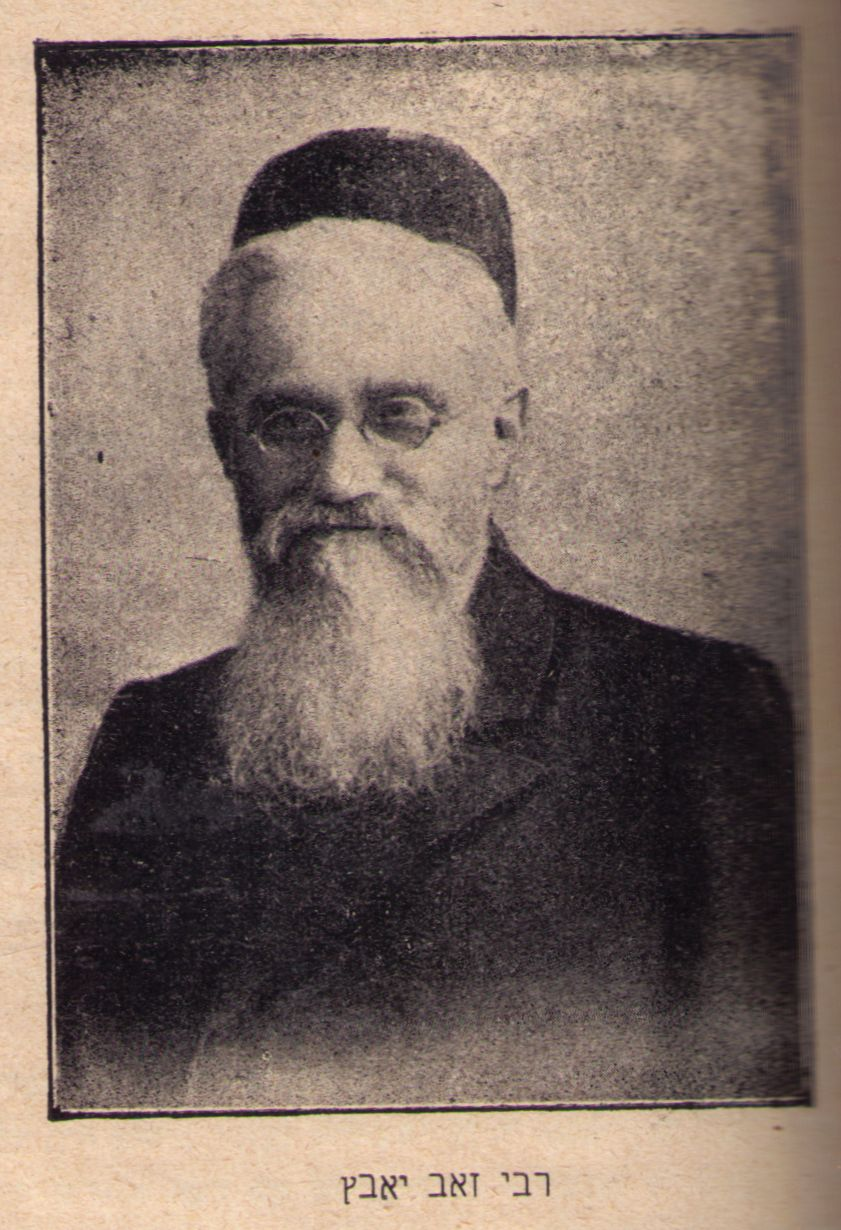
- Ze'ev Yavetz
- Born: Wolf Yavetz; 26 September 1847; Kolno, Russian Empire (today in Poland)
- Died: 24 January 1924 (aged 76); London, England
- Other names: Wolf Jawitz, Wolf Javetz
- Occupations: Historian, Teacher, Hebrew Linguist
- Known for: Founding member of the Mizrachi movement, coining modern Hebrew words, contributing to the celebration of Tu Bishvat

Ze'ev (Wolf) Yavetz (Jawitz, Javetz) (Hebrew: זאב יעבץ, 26 September 1847 – 24 January 1924) was a Jewish historian, teacher and Hebrew linguist.

== Biography ==
Ze'ev (Wolf) Yavetz was born in Kolno in the Russian Empire (today in Poland). He published his first historical article in HaShahar, a Hebrew monthly published by Peretz Smolenskin.

In 1887, at the age of 40, he immigrated to Ottoman Palestine. He initially worked in a vineyard in the Yehud moshava, before being recruited by Edmond James de Rothschild to be headmaster of a school in Zikhron Ya'akov. On Tu Bishvat that year he took his students to plant trees in Zikhron Ya'akov. This custom was adopted in 1908 by the Jewish Teachers Union and later by the Jewish National Fund.

Yavetz was a member of the Hebrew Language Committee, and coined several modern Hebrew words, including tarbut (culture) and kvish (road).

After falling out with Baron Rothschild's administrators he moved to Vilna. In 1902, he helped to found the Mizrachi movement and became the editor of its periodical HaMizrachi. In 1903, at a reception for Theodor Herzl, he presented the Zionist leader with a small Torah scroll in a carved holder as a gift of honor from the Vilna community.

Yavetz used the Bible in a new thematic and stylistic manner with the object of reviving ancient ways of life. He has been called a "proto-Orientalist."

In his later years he moved to England, where he completed his 14-volume history of the Jews entitled Toldot Yisrael. He died in London in 1924.

A moshav in Israel, Kfar Yavetz, is named after him.
