= Solomon Rubin =

Galician Hebrew author (1823–1910)

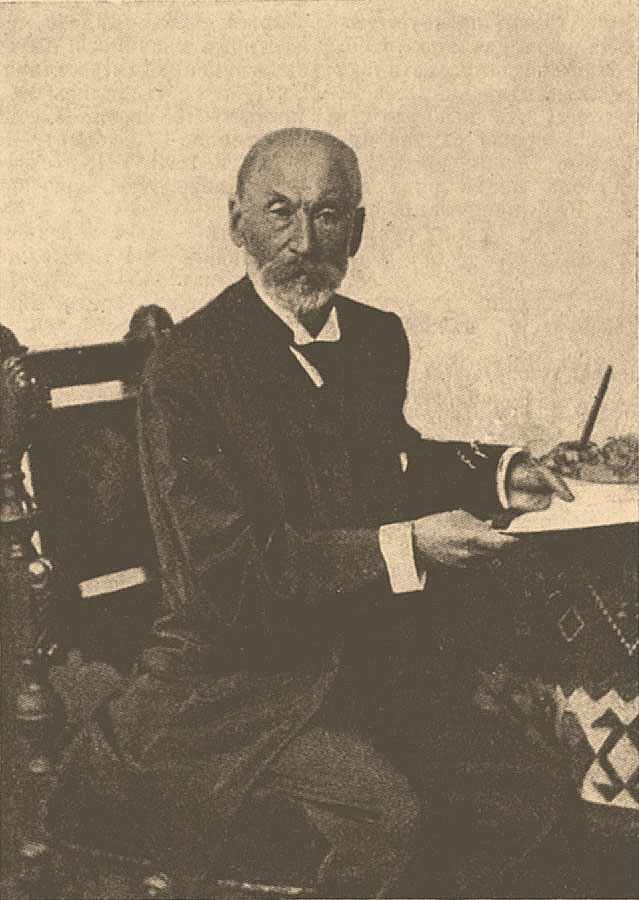
Solomon Rubin

Solomon Rubin (3 April 1823, in Dolina, Galicia – 1910) was a Galician Hebrew author.

== Life ==
He was educated for the rabbinate, but, being attracted by Haskalah and modern learning, he entered upon a business career which lasted about five years. This proving unsuccessful, so he went to Lemberg, where he studied bookkeeping at a technical institute, and also acquired a knowledge of German, French and Italian. After serving two years in the Austrian army he attempted to establish himself in Lemberg as a teacher; but persecution due to his liberal views made his position untenable, and he went to Romania, at that time a very favorable field for active and enterprising Galician Jews. He secured a good position in a commercial establishment in Galaţi, which enabled him to devote his evenings to his favorite studies.

In 1859 Rubin returned to Galicia and became principal of a school for Jewish boys in Bolechow. He went to Russia in 1863, where he was engaged as a private tutor in a wealthy Jewish family of Ostrog, Volhynia, with which he went to Vienna in 1865. There he met Peter Smolenskin, who was then in despair owing to the difficulty of continuing the publication of Ha-Shaḥar. Rubin promised him to write a complete work for that publication every year; and he kept his promise even after his personal relations with Smolenskin had become somewhat strained.

The years 1870 and 1871 were spent by Rubin as a private tutor in Naples, Italy, and from 1873 to 1878 he lived in the same capacity in the household of Jacob Poliakov in Taganrog, Russia. He then returned to Vienna, whence in 1895 he removed to Kraków.

== Works ==
Rubin was one of the most prolific of Neo-Hebrew writers and one of the most enthusiastic and persistent champions of haskalah. Most of his literary labors were directed against superstitious customs and beliefs: but his method is unique among writers of his class; for he neither ridicules such customs and beliefs, nor does he preach against them, but proceeds in a quasi-scientific manner to adduce proof that similar superstitions prevailed or are still prevailing among those who have attained to only a very low plane of culture. He objectively describes, or rather compiles descriptions of, superstitious practises, and sometimes only alludes, as if incidentally (mostly in footnotes), to the equivalent follies among fanatical Jews.

He published about twenty-five works with this object in view, two of which, the "Ma'aseTa'atuyim" (Vienna, 1887) and the "Yesod Mistere ha-'Akkum we-Sod Ḥokmat ha-Ḳabbalah" (ib. 1888), have appeared in German translations also, the first as "Geschichte des Aberglaubens" (transl. by I. Stern, Leipzig, 1888) and the second as "Heidenthum und Kabbala" (Vienna, 1892). A bibliography of his works and of the more important of his many articles in periodicals will be found in William Zeitlin, "Bibliotheca Hebraica Post-Mendelsohniana" (Leipzig, 1891-1895)

Rubin was an ardent admirer of the system and personality of Spinoza; and wrote much to prove the close relation between Spinozism and Judaism. Among his earliest literary productions are a compendium of Spinoza's writings, entitled "Moreh Nebukim he-Ḳadash" (Vienna, 1856-1857), and "Teshubah Niẓẓaḥat" (Lemberg, 1859), a refutation of S. D. Luzzatto's attacks on Spinoza. Rubin's essay in German, Spinoza und Maimonides, ein Psychologisch-Philosophisches Antitheton, won for the author the title of doctor of philosophy from the University of Göttingen. Later in life Rubin returned to his favorite philosopher and brought out "Ḥeḳer Eloah 'im Torat ha-Adam," a Hebrew translation of Spinoza's Ethics, with notes and an introduction. This is Rubin's most important contribution to Neo-Hebrew literature.

Among his later works are "Yalḳuṭ Shelomoh" (Cracow, 1896), consisting of ten essays, and "Segulot ha-Ẓemaḥim, we-Ototam" (German title, "Symbolik der Pflanzen"; ib. 1898).
