= Mikhail Gorbachev Pizza Hut commercial =

1998 television advertisement

- Mikhail Gorbachev with his granddaughter Anastasia Virganskaya in the commercial
- Agency: BBDO
- Client: Pizza Hut
- Language: Russian with subtitles in English language
- Running time: 1:00 or 0:30
- Product: Pizza
- Release date: January 1, 1998
- Slogan: "Good friends. Great pizza." or "Have you been to the edge?"
- Written by: Tom Darbyshire
- Starring: Mikhail Gorbachev; Anastasia Virganskaya; Richard Marner
- Country: Europe (Note: excluding Russia); United States

Mikhail Gorbachev, the last leader of the Soviet Union, was featured in a 1998 television advertisement for Pizza Hut. It was filmed in November 1997 on Red Square and in a Pizza Hut restaurant elsewhere in Moscow. It was aired internationally in January 1998, but not in Russia.

In the commercial, a family inside the Pizza Hut restaurant discusses Gorbachev's political legacy. The younger man and the older man loudly argue, until the older lady says that Gorbachev gave them Pizza Hut. The commercial has been described as illustrative of the victory of capitalism inside the former Soviet Union.

== Synopsis ==
External videos
- Gorbachev Pizza Hut commercial on YouTube (1 minute)

The commercial starts with an aerial view of the Cathedral of Christ the Saviour and Manezhnaya Square after a recent snowfall. Gorbachev walks through the snow with an umbrella, together with his granddaughter Anastasia Virganskaya while Saint Basil's Cathedral is visible in the background. They enter the Pizza Hut restaurant at Red Square and take a seat at a table in the corner.

A family at a different table recognizes Gorbachev and starts a conversation about him. They speak Russian but English subtitles are provided. The father of the family, played by Richard Marner, complains, "Because of him we have economic confusion." The son argues, "Because of him, we have opportunity." The conversation continues between the two men, deeply divided over Gorbachev's legacy. The elderly mother cuts in, saying, "Because of him we have many things, like Pizza Hut." The father and the son now both smile, having found agreement. The father stand up and chant "Hail to Gorbachev!". The rest of the family soon joins the chant, as does the entire restaurant, and Gorbachev is shown smiling.

The voiceover says: "Sometimes, nothing brings people together better than a nice hot pizza from Pizza Hut." The chorus of acclamations is heard even more loudly, as if resonating throughout Moscow. At the end, the slogan "Good friends. Great pizza." is shown. A different version was made that included the slogan "Have you been to the edge?".

== Background ==
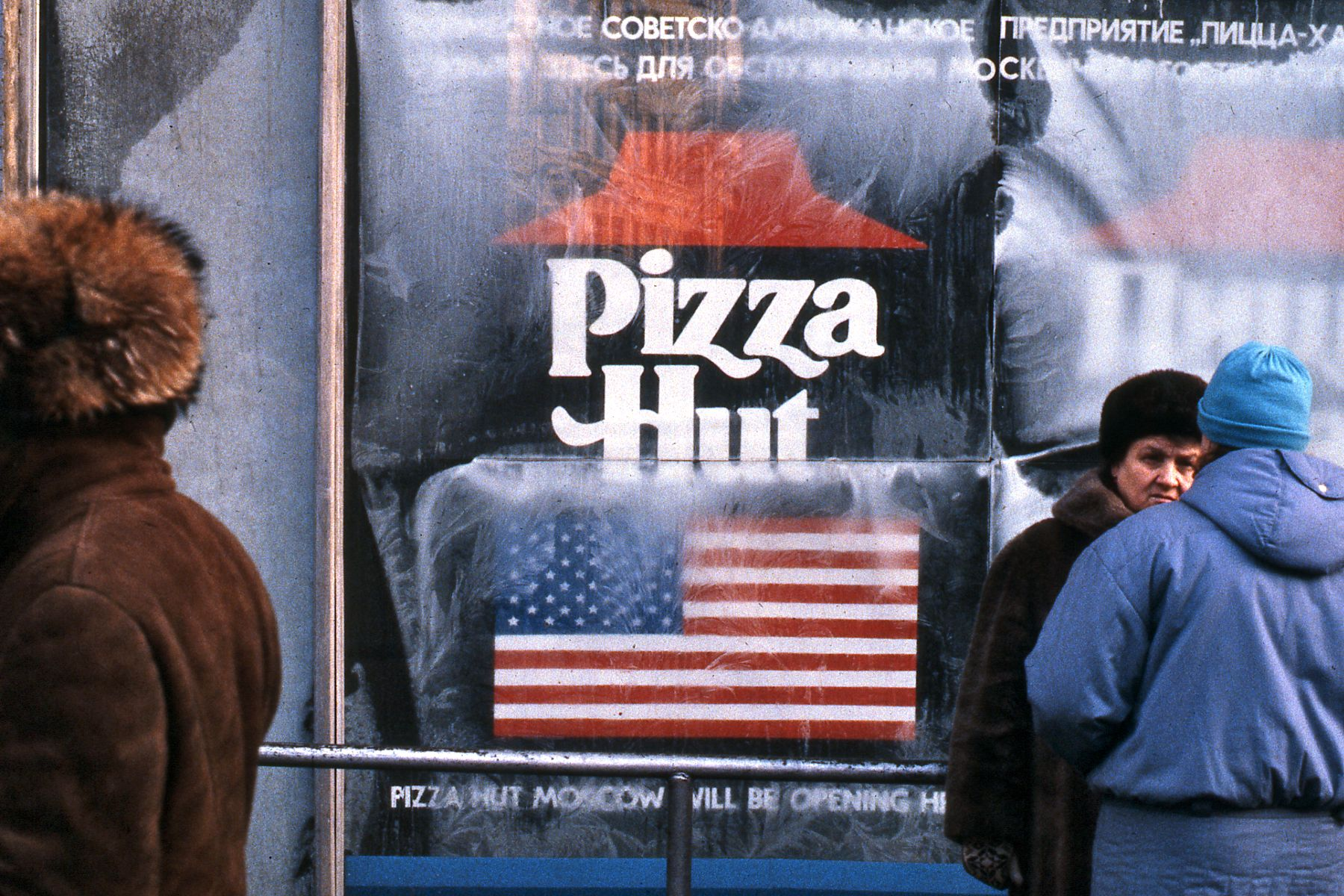
Pizza Hut in Moscow just before its first opening in 1990

Pizza Hut opened in 1990 in Moscow, a few months after the first McDonald's in Russia opened. It was one of the first foreign-owned restaurants that was able to open in Soviet Russia, thanks in part to Gorbachev's own perestroika policies. The idea for a Pizza Hut in Moscow came from a personal friendship between Soviet Ambassador to the United States Anatoly Dobrynin and Donald M. Kendall, CEO of Pizza Hut's parent company PepsiCo. It was part of the largest deal ever between the Soviet Union and an American corporation. The arrangement flopped after the Soviet Union collapsed, which killed Pizza Hut's supply chain.

Pizza Hut had frequently ordered advertisements from BBDO before. BBDO art director Ted Shaine recalled that the company "heard that [Gorbachev] was willing to do something", but others suggest BBDO came up with the idea themselves.

It took months to negotiate a deal. Katie O'Neill Bistrian at IMG negotiated for Gorbachev. The long duration was partly to increase the fee for Gorbachev, but also represented real hesitation on his part. His wife Raisa Gorbacheva feared that the ad could harm his reputation. Gorbachev agreed under the conditions that he could give his final approval over the script. He would also not eat pizza, which disappointed Pizza Hut. O'Neill Bistrian suggested that a member of Gorbachev's family would eat the pizza slice, which ended up being his granddaughter.

The exact amount that Gorbachev received was never disclosed, although it was argued that it was one of the largest talent fees in history. According to The New York Times, some reports indicate Gorbachev was paid close to US$1 million (equivalent to about $2M in 2025). Gorbachev said the money would be used for The Gorbachev Foundation, and was quoted in CNN saying:

I'm in the process of creating a library and a perestroika archive, and this project requires certain funds. Perestroika gave impetus to Russia and to the whole world. It is very important that everything that happened be preserved in these two centers. It's an important part of life. It's not only consumption, it's also socializing. If I didn't see that it was beneficial for people, I wouldn't have agreed to it.

== Production ==
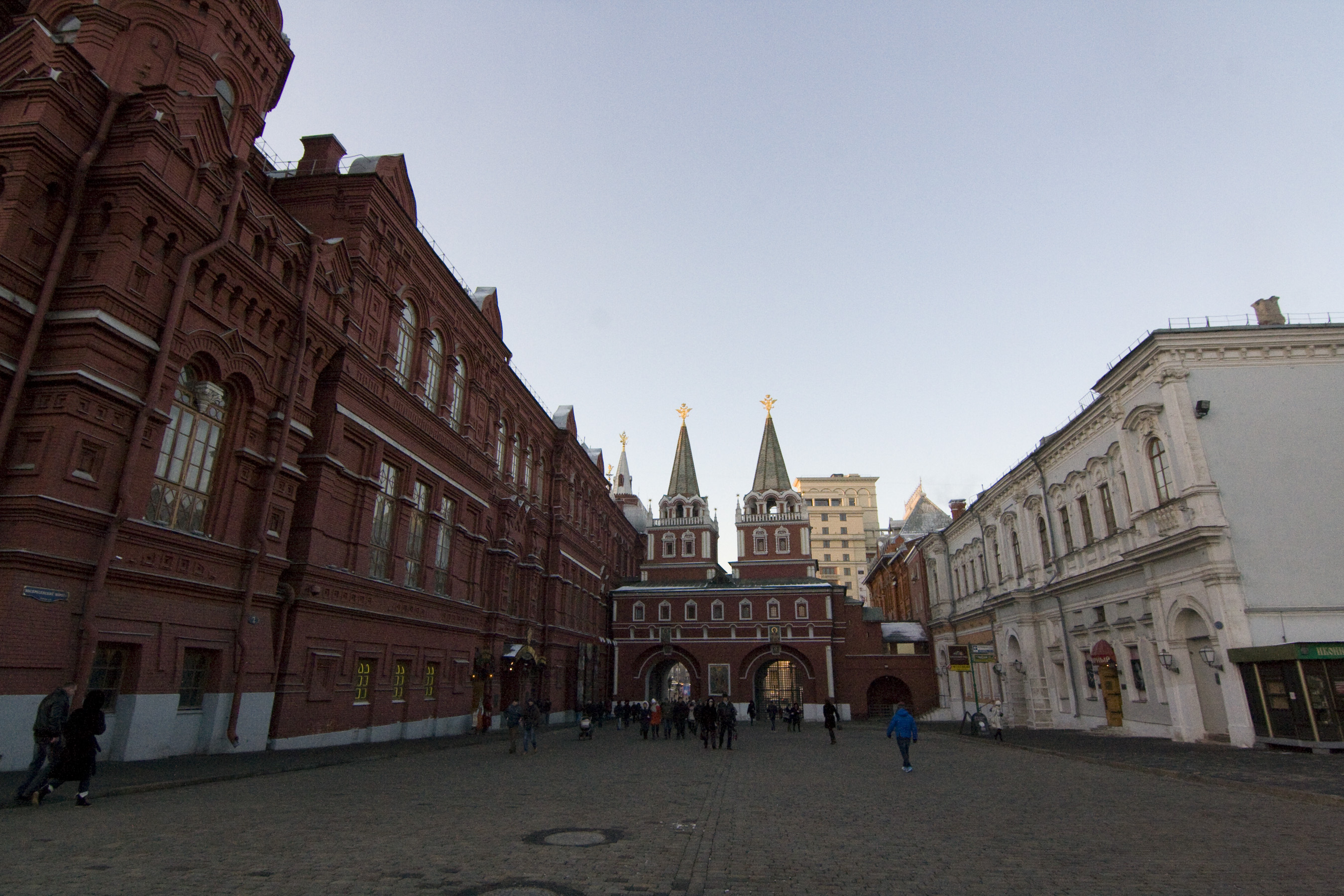
The white building on the right (which is a jewelry store) was used in the commercial. In the middle of the picture, the Iberian Gate and Chapel is visible.

O'Neill Bistrian, the director Peter Smillie and several others flew to Moscow in November 1997. The preproduction took several days. The principal photography took place over two days. Gorbachev arrived late, in a limousine. Red Square was shut down for a day during the filming. The Pizza Hut shown on Red Square was actually a jewelry store which was changed for the filming. The filming inside was done in an actual Pizza Hut restaurant in Moscow. For taking the shots of Red Square and churches, the crew hefted the film cameras on the Kremlin itself. Some challenges included the weather, which meant a low temperature and low light. The commercial was edited afterward by Clayton Hemmert from the firm Crew Cuts. He played a key role in shaping the ending of the commercial, by adding reverberation and layering chants over each other. The production costs were estimated to be in the low millions of dollars.

== Broadcast and reception ==
The commercial was broadcast in the United States during the 1998 Rose Bowl football game on January 1, but not in Russia where Gorbachev was widely criticized in the media for taking part in the advertisement. Years after the initial broadcast, the commercial became a viral video on multiple occasions. Time listed the commercial in a "Top 10 Embarrassing Celebrity Commercials" list. Thrillist named it in a 2014 article as one of the 11 most bizarre celebrity endorsements. In a 2010 interview by the Russian magazine Snob, Gorbachev stated that he received various letters of support.

== Analysis ==
Gorbachev has been described as a bystander to the drama occurring in the commercial. It has been described as a "beautiful film and weird advertisement" and as exploiting the shock value of having a former world leader appear. The ad also played on the fact that Gorbachev was far more popular outside Russia than inside it.

As stated by Tom Darbyshire to Newshour, it was understood that Gorbachev was to be used as a controversial figure, one that would use the former Soviet leader's mixed reputation to spark debate, only then to be united by the American pizza, which to Tom, was a good thing. It is said that the commercial reflects the mood of Russian society at the time, and has been known to be used in teaching. It highlights the differing ideologies between generations, with economic frustrations being at the forefront, Gorbachev is seen as the representative figure, as seen in the commercial.

The commercial suggested that capitalism was better than communism because it made Pizza Hut possible. In 2012, Nadia Kaneva and Elza Ibroscheva wrote that Gorbachev's appearance in the Pizza Hut ad—as well as his appearance in a 2007 Louis Vuitton print ad for which he was photographed by Annie Leibovitz—symbolized "the passing of communism and the triumph of the new, capitalist, and consumerist order" with Gorbachev's transformation "into a commercial spokesman for powerful Western brands" and the "co-optation of [his] iconic status for marketing purposes" serving as an ironic symbol of "his irrelevance as a political figure in the post-communist context."

== Further developments ==
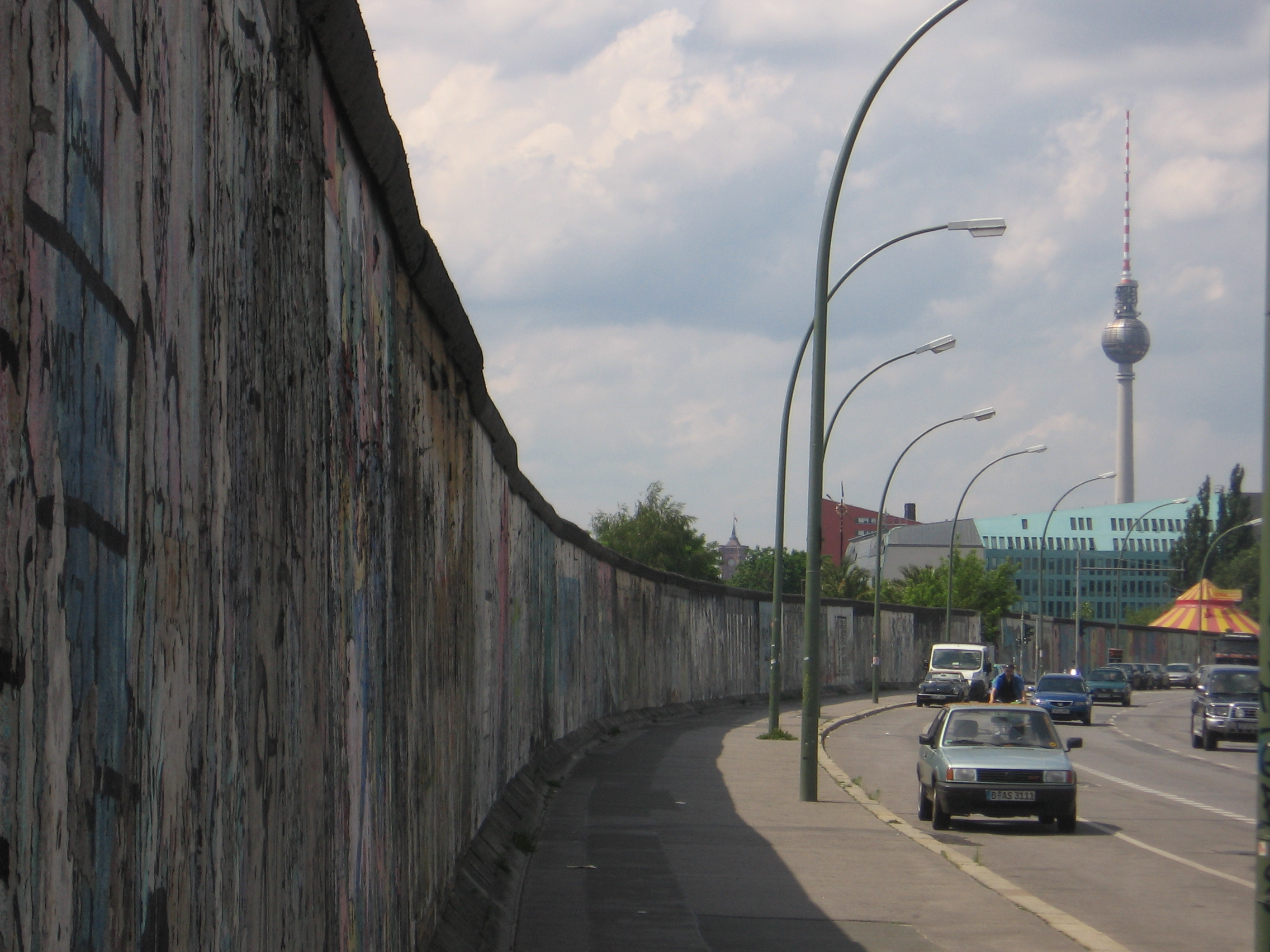
Remaining part of the Berlin Wall, which fell in 1989 during Gorbachev's term.

Pizza Hut left Moscow in October 1998, but they returned in March 2000. Gorbachev told The Guardian that he lost his savings due to the 1998 Russian financial crisis.

In 1997, Gorbachev told CNN that he did not plan to participate in advertisements again. In 2000, however, Gorbachev was featured in an advertisement made in Vienna by Demner, Merlicek & Bergmann for the ÖBB, the Austrian federal railways. The slogan was "Perestroika in the ÖBB" and was filmed at the Wien Floridsdorf railway station. The ad was broadcast on ORF for the first time on May 10, 2000. In 2007, Gorbachev was featured in a photograph advertisement taken by Annie Leibovitz for Louis Vuitton in a car next to remaining parts of the Berlin Wall. Unlike the Pizza Hut commercial, this advertisement was shown in Russia.

Pizza Hut suspended operations of their 50 Russian outlets in response to the Russian invasion of Ukraine. In the hours following Gorbachev's death later the same year, Pizza Hut became a trending topic on Twitter.

== See also ==
- Television in Russia
- Perestroika
- Glasnost
