= Aaron Liebermann =

Jewish socialist author

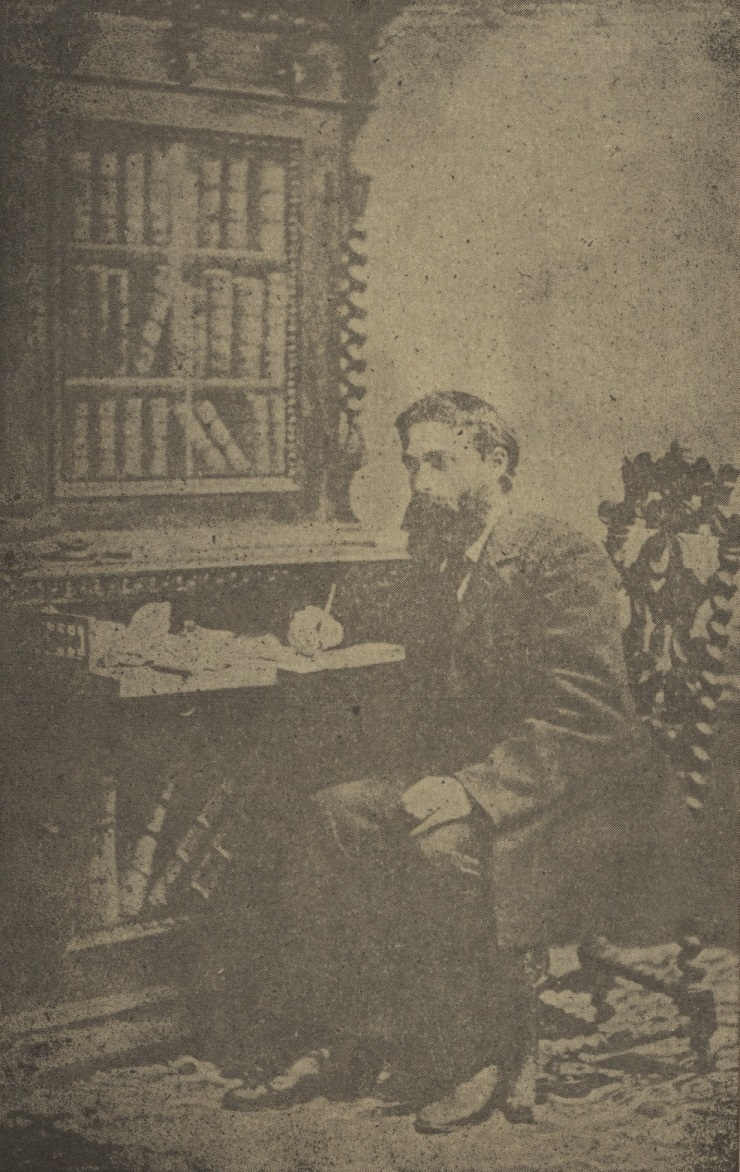
- Born: May 20, 1845; Luna, Grodno Region, Russian Empire
- Died: November 18, 1880 (aged 35); Syracuse, New York, United States
- Resting place: Mount Carmel Cemetery, Queens, New York
- Spouse: Raḥel Trotsky (m. 1866; div. 1880)
- Writing career
- Pen name: Bar Drora (בָּר דְּרוֹרָא); Daniel Ish-Ḥamudot (דָּנִיאֵל אִישׁ חֲמוּדוֹת); Arthur Freeman
- Language: Hebrew

Aaron Samuel Liebermann (Hebrew: אַהֲרֹן שְׁמוּאֵל לִיבֶּרְמַן, Aharon Shmu'el Liberman; 20 May 1845 – 18 November 1880), also known by his pen names Bar Drora, Daniel Ish Ḥamudot, and later as Arthur Freeman, was a socialist author, Hebrew translator, and political essayist. A pioneer of Jewish socialism and the Jewish labour movement, he was described by Rudolf Rocker and Ber Borochov as the "father of Jewish socialism".

== Biography ==
=== Early life ===
Aaron Samuel Liebermann was born in Luna, a shtetl in the province of Grodno, Russia. His father, Eliezer Dov Liebermann, was a maskilic author and scholar. His family moved to Bialystok and from there to Suvalk, where Liebermann received his early education.

In 1866, he married Raḥel Trotsky, with whom he had three daughters and a son. He graduated from the Vilna Rabbinical Seminary with a teacher's diploma in 1867, and returned to Suvalk, where he was appointed secretary of the community and teacher. He began studies at the Technological Institute of St. Petersburg in 1870. There, Lieberman joined a revolutionary student circle and became acquainted with the subversive literature that had arrived in Russia from abroad.

Financial woes led him to return to Vilna in 1874, where he worked at the Dvigatel insurance company and in draftsmanship, and soon became a leading figure in an underground circle of Jewish socialists in that city. That same year he published a fictional satire entitled 'The Crux of the Matter' in Peretz Smolenskin's Hebrew journal Ha-Shaḥar ('The Dawn'). The Vilna secret police issued a warrant for his arrest in July 1875; Lieberman managed to escape, and settled in London in August after brief stays in Königsberg and Berlin.

=== Exile ===
In England, Liebermann became involved with Peter Lavrov's Russian-language revolutionary journal Vpered! based in North London. As well as serving as its editor and typesetter, Liebermann published in Vpered! a number of unsigned articles and correspondences about the life of the Jews in Lithuania and Belorussia, emphasizing their discrimination, persecution, and lack of civic rights. In January 1876 he published a socialist manifesto entitled El shlomei baḥurei yisrael ('To the Young Men of Israel'), which was smuggled into Russia in thousands of copies, addressed primarily to Russian yeshiva students. That May he inaugurated with nine others the short-lived Agudat haSozialistim haIvrit (Hebrew Socialist Union), the first Jewish workers' organization. Liebermann was appointed Secretary and drew up the statutes of the Union, which he composed in classical Hebrew and Yiddish.

After clashes between the members of the Union and the police, Liebermann left London in December 1876, settling eventually in Vienna under the false name of Arthur Freeman. He formed and led a group of authors who shared his views, such as Ludvig Levin Jacobson, Moshe Kamyonski, Isaac Kaminer, and Tzvi ha-Kohen Scherschewski. Ha-Emet ('The Truth'), the first Jewish socialist publication, made its debut in May 1877 with Liebermann as its publisher and editor, thanks to the financial contribution of Johann Most. The Viennese authorities shut the periodical down after the third issue and arrested Liebermann in February 1878 on charges of carrying a false U.S. passport and setting up an illegal and subversive organization. After spending nine months in prison, he was extradited by the Prussian police under anti-socialist laws and sentenced to nine additional months in prison in Berlin.

=== Later life ===
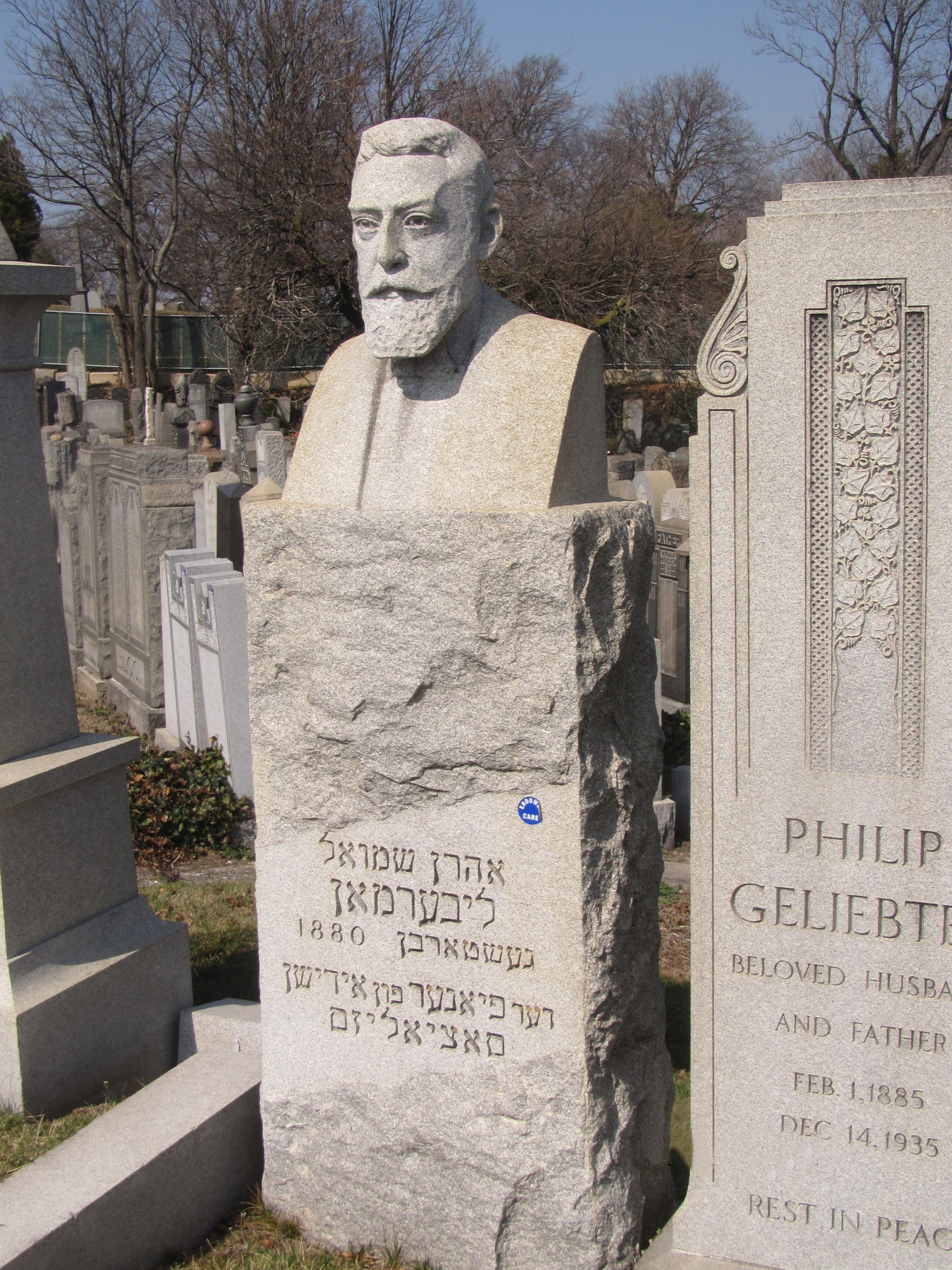
Liebermann's gravestone in Queens, New York

Liebermann returned to London after his release in January 1880, his mental balance deeply affected by prison life. He contributed several articles to Johann Most's journal Freiheit and, together with Morris Winchevsky, established the Jewish Workingmen's Benefit and Educational Society. Still, Liebermann's attempts to resume his socialist activities in London were largely unsuccessful. He offered his services to the terrorist organization Narodnaya Volya, but was rejected for being temperamentally unsuitable.

By the summer of 1880, Liebermann had fallen in love with Winchevsky's (married) sister-in-law, Rachel Sarasohn, and sent a writ of divorce to his wife. The love was not reciprocated, and Sarasohn departed with her daughter for Syracuse, New York to join her husband. Lieberman followed her to the United States, and committed suicide on 18 November 1880 after she refused to leave her husband, leaving behind the following note (written in Yiddish):

Long live the world! He who finds only misery and pain is doomed to die. Do not accuse me ere you have put yourself in my position.

Buried in obscurity in a cemetery in Syracuse, Liebermann's remains were later re-interred next to those of Winchevsky in the Workmen's Circle Mount Carmel Cemetery in Queens on 24 June 1934.

== See also ==
- Hebrew Socialist Union in London
- Vpered!
