= Benjamin Fuenn =

Lithuanian physician (1848–1901)

- Born: Benjamin Isaac Fuenn; 1848; Vilna, Vilna Governorate, Russian Empire
- Died: 12 August 1901 (aged 52–53); Vilna, Vilna Governorate, Russian Empire
- Education: University of St. Petersburg
- Occupation: Physician

Benjamin Isaac Fuenn (Hebrew: בנימין פין; 1848 – 12 August 1901) was a Lithuanian physician.

== Biography ==
Fuenn was born in Vilna in 1848, the son of prominent maskil Samuel Joseph Fuenn. His mother died shortly after his birth in that year's cholera pandemic. Educated at the rabbinical seminary of his native city, he taught for two years, and then studied medicine, being graduated as M.D. from the University of St. Petersburg. He settled in Vilna, and devoted his professional skill to the healing of the poor.

Fuenn was active in interesting the Jews in agriculture, and for three years was a trustee of a society for the assistance of Jewish immigrants to Palestine and Syria. In 1898 he was one of the three elders elected to administer the affairs of the Jewish community of Vilna. He left the greater part of his fortune to charitable institutions and for the furtherance of Jewish settlement in Palestine.

Among Fuenn's numerous papers in scientific journals, the most noteworthy is that on the Jewish laws concerning the slaughtering of animals considered from a medical standpoint, contributed to the periodical Keneset Yisrael (i. 910 et seq.).
