= Ha-Shaḥar =

Hebrew-language Austrian periodical

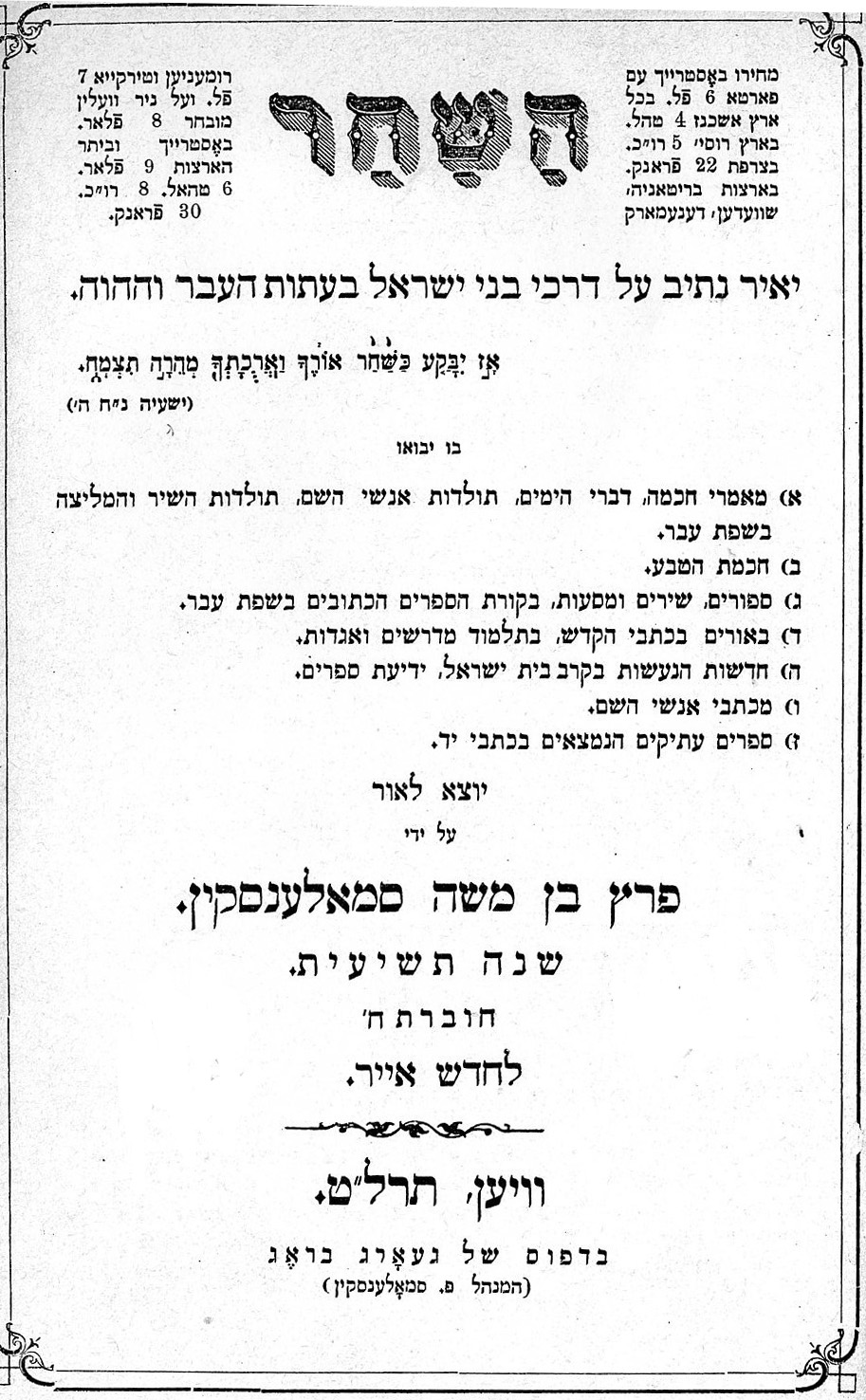
- Title page of Ha-Shaḥar, May 1879
- Editor: Peretz Smolenskin
- Frequency: Monthly
- Total circulation: 800–1,300
- Founder: Peretz Smolenskin
- First issue: 1868
- Final issue: 1884
- Based in: Vienna, Austria-Hungary
- Language: Hebrew

Ha-Shaḥar (Hebrew: הַשַּׁחַר, lit. 'The Dawn') was a Hebrew-language monthly periodical, published and edited at Vienna by Peretz Smolenskin from 1868 to 1884.

The journal contained scientific articles, essays, biographies, and literature, as well as general Jewish news. The objects of Smolenskin were to spread Enlightenment and knowledge of the Hebrew language, and particularly to oppose obscurantism. Its publication was interrupted several times for lack of support. Ha-Shaḥar greatly influenced the Haskalah movement, especially in Russia, where it was well known. It was read secretly in the yeshivot, in private houses, and in the batte midrashot.

== Contributors ==
Among the periodical's contributors were:

- Eliezer Ben-Yehuda
- Mordekhai David Brandstetter
- Reuben Asher Braudes
- Salomon Buber
- Menaḥem Mendel Dolitzki
- Israel Frenkel
- Abraham Shalom Friedberg
- David Frischmann
- Judah Leib Gordon
- Avrom Ber Gotlober
- Hayyim Jonah Gurland
- Alexander Harkavy
- Ish-Shalom
- Adolf Jellinek
- Bertha Kreidmann
- Adam ha-Kohen
- David Kahana
- Isaac Kaminer
- Abraham Krochmal
- Hayyim Tzvi Lerner
- Yehudah Leib Levin
- Joshua Lewinsohn
- Aaron Liebermann
- Moshe Leib Lilienblum
- Salomon Mandelkern
- Joel Müller
- I. L. Peretz
- Jacob Reifmann
- Solomon Rubin
- Senior Sachs
- Isaac Hirsch Weiss
- Ze'ev Yavetz
- Samuel Leib Zitron
