= Joshua Lewinsohn =

Joshua Lewinsohn was a Russian teacher and writer. He was born in 1833 at Vyeshiuti, in the Kovno region. He received his Talmudical education at Zhagory, in the house of his uncle Simon Hurvitz, and graduated in 1865 from the Gymnasium of Mitau, remaining there until 1874, when he was appointed inspector of the Jewish school at Tukum, Courland. His first articles in Hebrew appeared in "Ha-Maggid" in 1857; he contributed extensively to that paper and to Ha-Melitz, Ha-Shachar, and other Hebrew periodicals. He was also for many years a contributor to the German Rigasche Zeitung.

Lewinsohn published: Eretz Russia u-Melo'ah (Wilna, 1868), a geography and topography of Russia; Toledot Anshe Shem be-Yisrael, biographies of about fifty Jewish authors; and "Toledot Sechar ha-Yehudim" (in Ha-Shachar), a history of Jewish commerce. He also wrote numerous articles on Jewish history which appeared in various periodicals.
