= Monument to Yuri Gagarin =

Statue in Moscow

- Памятник Гагарину Ю.А.
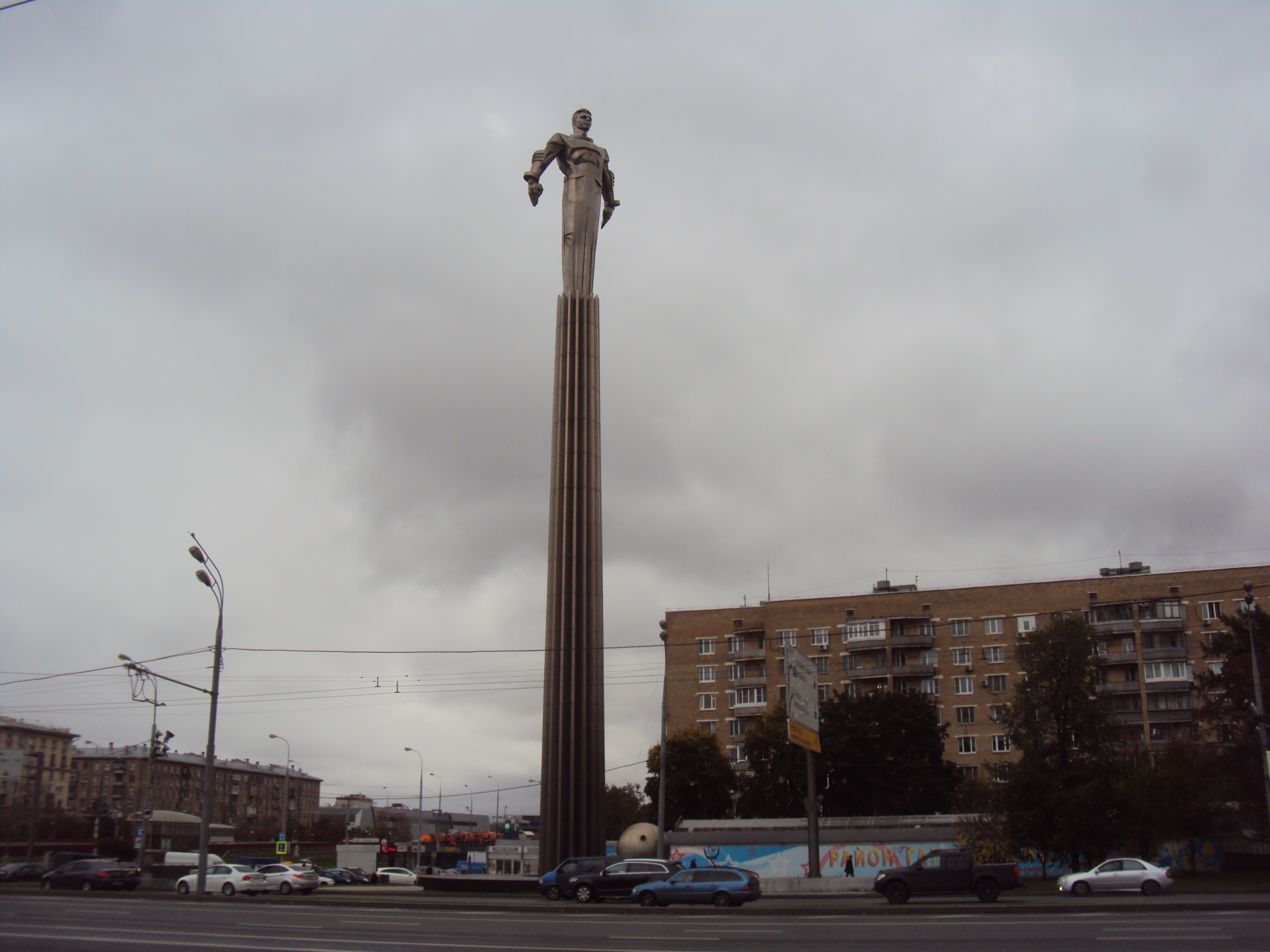
- Interactive map of Monument to Yuri Gagarin
- Location: Gagarin Square, Moscow
- Coordinates: 55.7082°N 37.5824°E
- Designer: Pavel (Paul) Bondarenko
- Type: Statue
- Material: Cast titanium on granite base
- Height: 42.5 metres (139 ft)
- Opening date: July 4, 1980

Monument to Yuri Gagarin is a 42.5-meter high pedestal and statue of Yuri Gagarin, the first person to travel in space. It is located at Leninsky Prospekt in Moscow. The pedestal is designed to be reminiscent of a rocket exhaust. The statue is made of titanium, a metal often used in spacecraft, and weighs 12 tons.

== Description ==
Base of the monument

The monument to Yuri Gagarin was built for the 1980 Olympic Games. It stands in Gagarin Square on Leninsky Avenue. The creators of the monument are the sculptor Pavel Bondarenko, architects Yakov Belopolsky, F.M. Gazhevsky, and designer A.F. Sudakov. The monument is made of titanium and mounted on a high ribbed pedestal. The total height of the monument is 42.5 metres (139 ft), the total weight is 12 tons. At the foot of the monument is a copy of the Vostok descent vehicle, which was flown on April 12, 1961, when Yuri Gagarin made the first crewed flight into space.

The statue creators turned to the specialists at the All-Russian Institute Of Aviation Materials (VIAM) for help, who recommended the sculpture use the titanium casting alloy VT5L, which has a shiny surface and acceptable color. In addition, specialists at VIAM developed technical processes used by VSMPO to cast ingots of VT5L alloy with a low oxygen content (0.12%).

The monument was made in less than a year at the Balashikha Foundry and Mechanical Plant. The titanium sculpture of Yuri Gagarin was assembled from 238 cast segments, which were connected with bolts and welding. The greatest problems arose with the manufacture of the largest segment – the cosmonaut's face. Its weight was 300 kilograms (660 lb), which was too heavy for melting in a vacuum oven. The Monument to Yuri Gagarin is the world's first large-scale monument made of titanium.

The figure of Gagarin is facing upward. The high ribbed pedestal is an important part of the composition and symbolizes the launch of the space rocket. The inscription at the base of the monument reads (in Russian):

On April 12, 1961, the Soviet space ship Vostok with a man on board flew around the globe. The first person to penetrate into space is a citizen of the Union of Soviet Socialist Republics, Yuri Gagarin.

== Commemorative coin ==
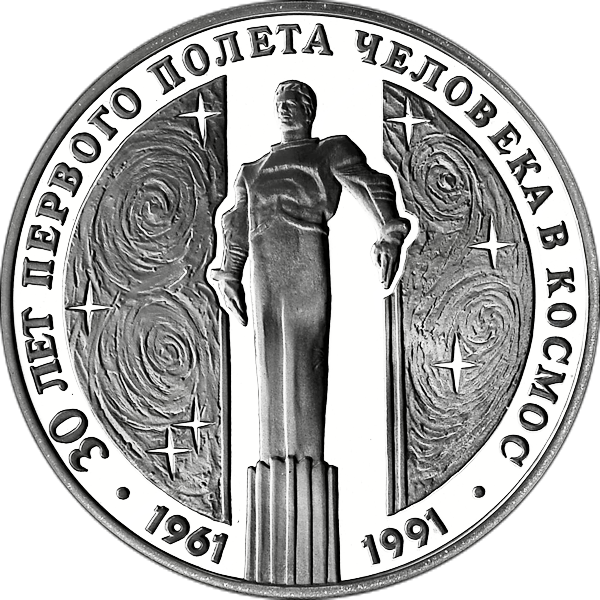
The reverse side of a 1991 USSR 3-ruble coin

The monument to Yuri Gagarin is depicted on the reverse side of a non-circulating 1 oz silver 3 rouble coin. This coin was minted in 1991 to honor the 30th anniversary of human spaceflight. An image of the monument is depicted on the back side of the coin, along with the words (in Russian) "30 years of human spaceflight".

== Restoration 2024 ==
In 2024 the monument was restored. The restoration is carried out under the supervision of specialists from the Department of Cultural Heritage of Moscow, as the monument is an object of cultural heritage.

Works such as cleaning the stylobate from dirt and paint stains, replacing destroyed cladding blocks and slabs, and waxing stones were carried out. The monument was cleaned of dirt, corrosion, and all titanium plates were washed.

== Other monuments dedicated to Gagarin ==
A statue of Gagarin in Tashkent, Uzbekistan.

There are many different monuments and sights commemorating Gagarin, such as one in Baikonour, in the town Gagarin, or the Statue of Yuri Gagarin, Greenwich.

== See also ==
- Monument to the Conquerors of Space
