= Mordechai Tzvi Maneh =

Russian artist, writer and poet

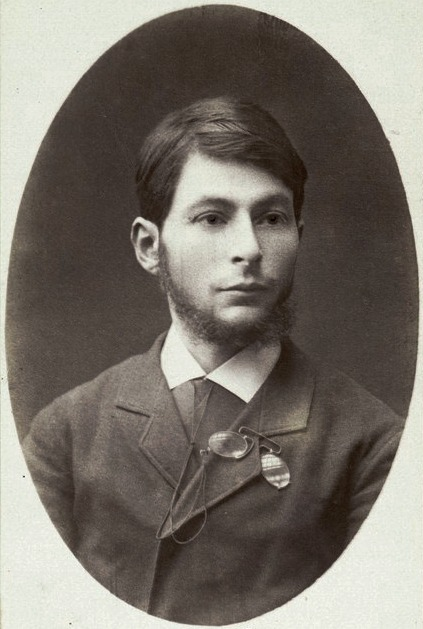
- Born: May 5, 1859; Radoshkevich, Russian Empire
- Died: October 15, 1886 (aged 27); Radoshkevich, Russian Empire
- Writing career
- Pen name: Ha-Metzayer
- Language: Hebrew
- Notable work: Mas’at nafshi (1886)

Mordechai Tzvi Maneh (Hebrew: מֹרְדְּכַי צְבִי מאַנֶע, romanized: Mordek̲ay Z̲evi Manēh; 5 May 1859 – 15 October 1886), also known by the pen name Ha-Metzayer (Hebrew: הַמְצַיֵּ״ר, lit. 'The Painter'; also an acronym of הַבָּחוּר מֹרְדְּכַי צְבִי יָלִיד ראדוֹשְׁקבִיץ׳, lit. 'The young man Mordechai Tzvi, native of Radoshkevich'), was a Russian Hebrew lyric poet, translator, and artist.

== Life and work ==
Mordechai Tzvi Maneh was born to a poor Jewish family in Radashkovichy, Vilna Governorate. His father, Moshe Maneh, was a melamed and tombstone engraver. As a child, he received a traditional cheder education, and was sent at the age of thirteen to study at a yeshiva in Minsk. Maneh's parents encouraged his early artistic talent and, in 1876, he enrolled in the Vilna Art School. While there, he began to write nature poetry and mastered the Russian and German languages.

In 1880 Maneh received an offer of admission to the prestigious Imperial Academy of Arts in Saint Petersburg. He remained there from 1881 to 1884, his studies subsidized by philanthropist A. Kaufman on the recommendation of Aleksander Zederbaum. During his time at the academy, Maneh published poetry and articles on the visual arts in the Hebrew publications Ha-Melitz and Ha-Tzfira, under the pseudonym Ha-Metzayer.

Maneh left for Warsaw in 1884, where he contributed to Ha-Asif and Knesset Israel. He soon, however, contracted a severe form of tuberculosis and was forced to return to his hometown, spending there the last two years of his life. Shortly before his death in 1886, Maneh composed his best-known poem, "Mas’at nafshi" (Hebrew: מַשְׂאַת נַפְשִׁי, lit. 'My Soul's Desire'), wherein he expressed his longing for the Land of Israel.

== Death and legacy ==
Title page of Kol kitve Mordechai Tzvi Maneh

Kol kitve Mordechai Tzvi Maneh, an anthology of Maneh's work, was published posthumously in 1897 under the editorship of A. L. Schoenhaus. A ritual of frequent memorial ceremonies at Maneh's grave developed in his hometown, that continued to be observed for a number of decades after his death.

"Mas’at nafshi" was set to music by composer Chanan Winternitz, a version of which served as the musical opening to the 1970s Israeli television program Sharti Lach Artzi The poem was translated into English as "My Longing" by H. H. Fein in 1934.

Streets in Tel Aviv, Haifa, Ramat Gan, and the Talbiya neighbourhood of Jerusalem bear his name.
