= Eliezer Dob Liebermann =

Russian writer & scholar (1820–1895)

- Born: 12 April 1820; Suwałki Governorate
- Died: 15 April 1895 (aged 75)
- Children: Aaron Liebermann
- Writing career
- Language: Hebrew
- Literary movement: Haskalah

Eliezer Dob Liebermann (Yiddish: אליעזר דוב ליבערמאן; 12 April 1820 – 15 April 1895) was a Russian maskilic writer and scholar.

== Biography ==
Liebermann was born in Pilvischok in the region of Suwałki. His father was a shoḥet, and gave him a traditional Jewish education. At the age of twelve he was sent to his uncle Rabbi Elijah Schick ('Reb Elinke Lider'), then the rabbi of Amstibove, who instructed him in Talmud and rabbinical literature. In 1838 he went to Vilna and joined the maskilim. In about 1844 he settled as a teacher in Białystok. In 1867 he left to Suwałki, remained there about twenty years, and then returned to Białystok.

He was the author of Megillat sefer, a collection of short stories, essays, fables, and letters, and of Tsedaka u-mishpat, a Hebrew adaptation of S. D. Luzzatto's Lezioni di Teologia Morale Israelitica. He wrote also Ge ḥizzayon, several works still in manuscript, and a number of articles which he published in various Hebrew periodicals.

== Bibliography ==
- Megillat sefer (in Hebrew). Johannisberg. 1854.
- Tsedaka u-mishpat [Righteousness and Justice] (in Hebrew). Vilna: S. Y. Fuenn & A. T. Rosenkranz. 1866. hdl:2027/uc1.a0001943570.
- Ge ḥizzayon (in Hebrew). Warsaw. 1889.
