= Radnor Township =

Radnor Township may refer to:

== Canada ==
- Radnor Township, Quebec

== United States ==
- Radnor Township, Peoria County, Illinois
- Radnor Township, Delaware County, Ohio
- Radnor Township, Delaware County, Pennsylvania
