= Samuel Joseph Fuenn =

Jewish scholar (1818–1891)

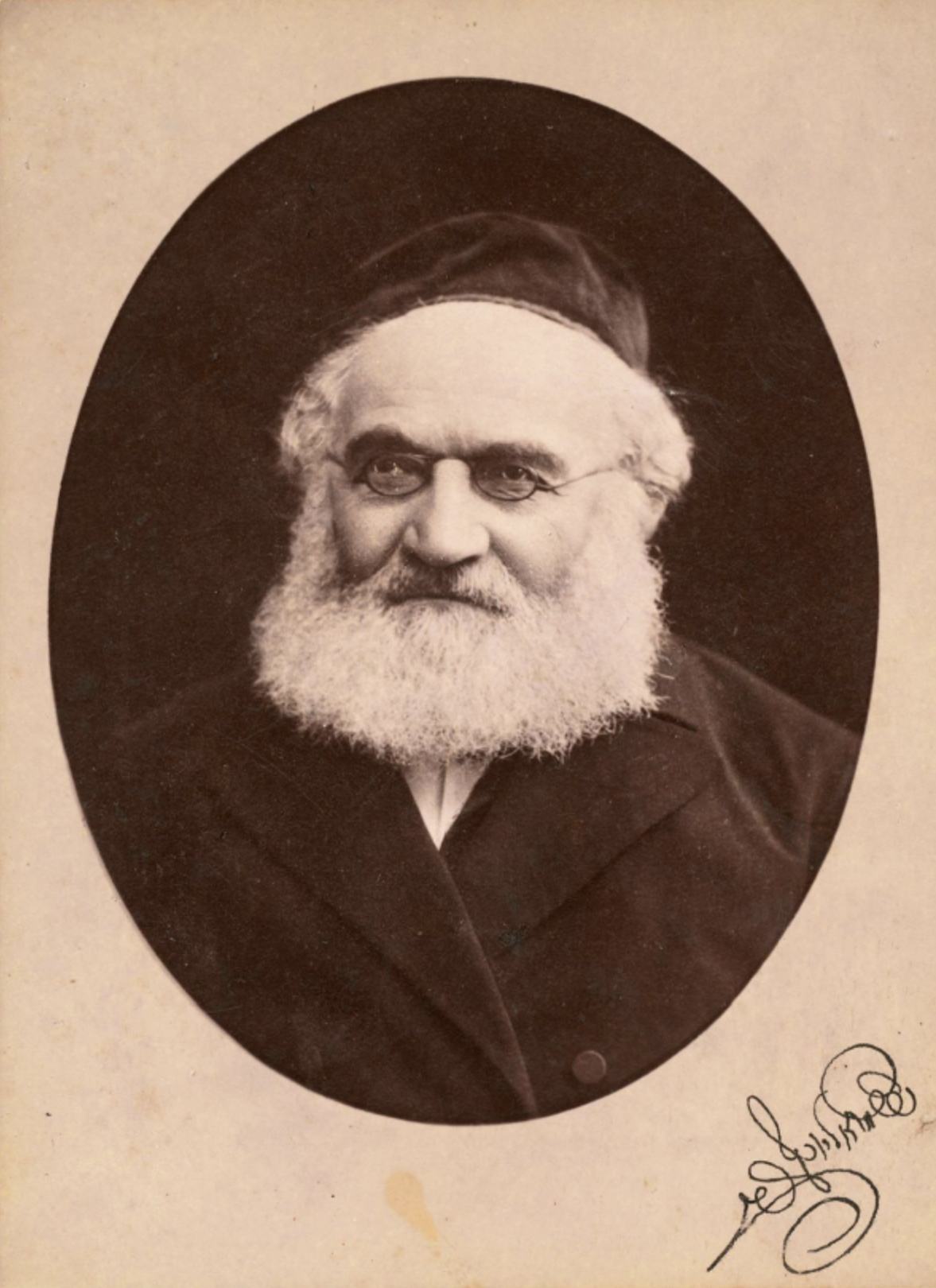
- Born: 15 October 1818; Vilna, Vilna Governorate, Russian Empire
- Died: 11 January 1891 (aged 72); Vilna, Vilna Governorate, Russian Empire
- Children: Dr. Benjamin Fuenn
- Writing career
- Language: Hebrew
- Subjects: Lexicography; Jewish history; History of literature
- Notable works: Kiryah ne'emanah (1860); Safah le-ne'emanim (1881); Ha-otsar (1884)
- Literary movement: Haskalah

Signature
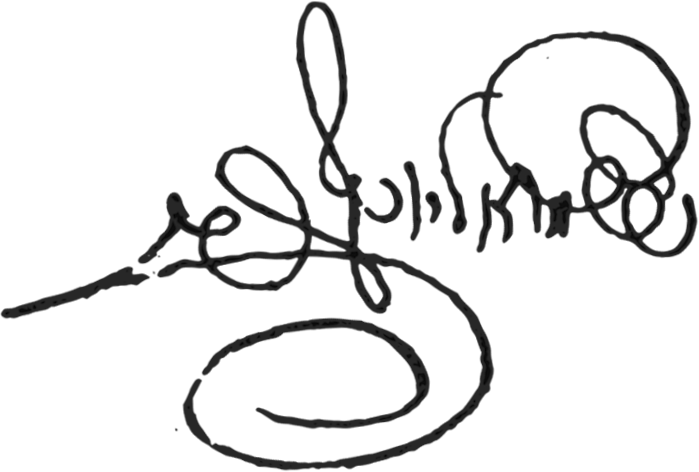

Samuel Joseph Fuenn (Hebrew: שמואל יוסף פין, romanized: Shmuel Yosef Fin; 15 October 1818 – 11 January 1891), (Note: While some sources list his date of birth as September or October 1819,, Fuenn in his autobiography writes that he was born in Vilna on 15 Tishri 5578 (25 September 1817) or 5579 (15 October 1818). Sokolow and Zeitlin agree he was born on 15 Tishri 5579.) also known as Rashi Fuenn (רש״י פין) and Rashif (רשי״ף), was a Lithuanian Hebrew writer, scholar, printer, and editor. He was a leading figure of the eastern European Haskalah, and an early member of Ḥovevei Zion.

== Biography ==
Fuenn was born in Vilna, Russian Empire, the son of merchant and Torah scholar Yitsḥak Aizik Fuenn of Grodno. Though he received a traditional religious education until the age of 17, he also acquired an extensive general knowledge of German literature and other secular subjects, and became proficient in Russian, French, Latin, Polish, and English. He afterwards joined Vilna's circle of young maskilim.

In 1848 the government appointed him teacher of Hebrew and Jewish history in the newly founded rabbinical school of Vilna. Fuenn filled this position with great distinction till 1856, when he resigned. The government then appointed him superintendent of the Jewish public schools in the district of Vilna, in which he introduced instruction in secular studies and modern languages. Since Fuenn (Russian финѣ) was employed in the Russian civil service, there was a special feature for him as a Jew, he had to legally sign in Russian according to the applicable Russian laws. Excerpt from the text of the law § 6 The Jew of the Russian Empire in translation: "The use of the Jewish language is not permitted in legal transactions. However, Hebrew home wills are permissible. If a Jew who does not speak any language other than Jewish, a document written or signed in Hebrew must be accompanied by a translation and the signature duly notarized.

He was a prolific writer, devoting his activity mainly to the fields of history and literature. With Eliezer Lipman Hurwitz he edited the short-lived Hebrew periodical Pirḥe tzafon ('Northern Flowers', 1841–43), a review of history, literature, and exegesis. For twenty-one years (1860–81), he directed the paper Ha-Karmel ('The Carmel'; at first a weekly, but from 1871 a monthly), devoted to Hebrew literature and Jewish life, with supplements in Russian and German. The paper contained many academic articles by the leading Jewish scholars of Europe, besides numerous contributions from Fuenn's own pen, including a serialized autobiography entitled Dor ve-dorshav. He opened a new Hebrew printing press in Vilna in 1863.

Besides his scholarly work, Fuenn owned some property in Vilna, including a bathhouse on Zarechye Street. He took an active part in the administration of the city and in its charitable institutions, and was for many years an alderman. In acknowledgment of his services the government awarded him two medals. He also presided over the third Ḥovevei Zion conference in Vilna, at which he, Samuel Mohilever, and Asher Ginzberg were chosen to direct the affairs of the delegate societies.

Fuenn died in Vilna on 11 January 1891. He bequeathed his entire estate to his son, Dr. Benjamin Fuenn, his daughter having converted to Catholicism some years earlier. After Benjamin's death, Fuenn's extensive library was added to the collection of the Strashun Library.

== Personal life ==
Fuenn was married off by his parents at a young age. His first wife died in 1845 while their daughter was still a baby, and his second wife died in the 1848 cholera pandemic, shortly after giving birth to their son Benjamin. He married a third wife in 1851.

His niece was the Labour Zionist politician Manya Shochat.

== Work ==
=== Publications ===
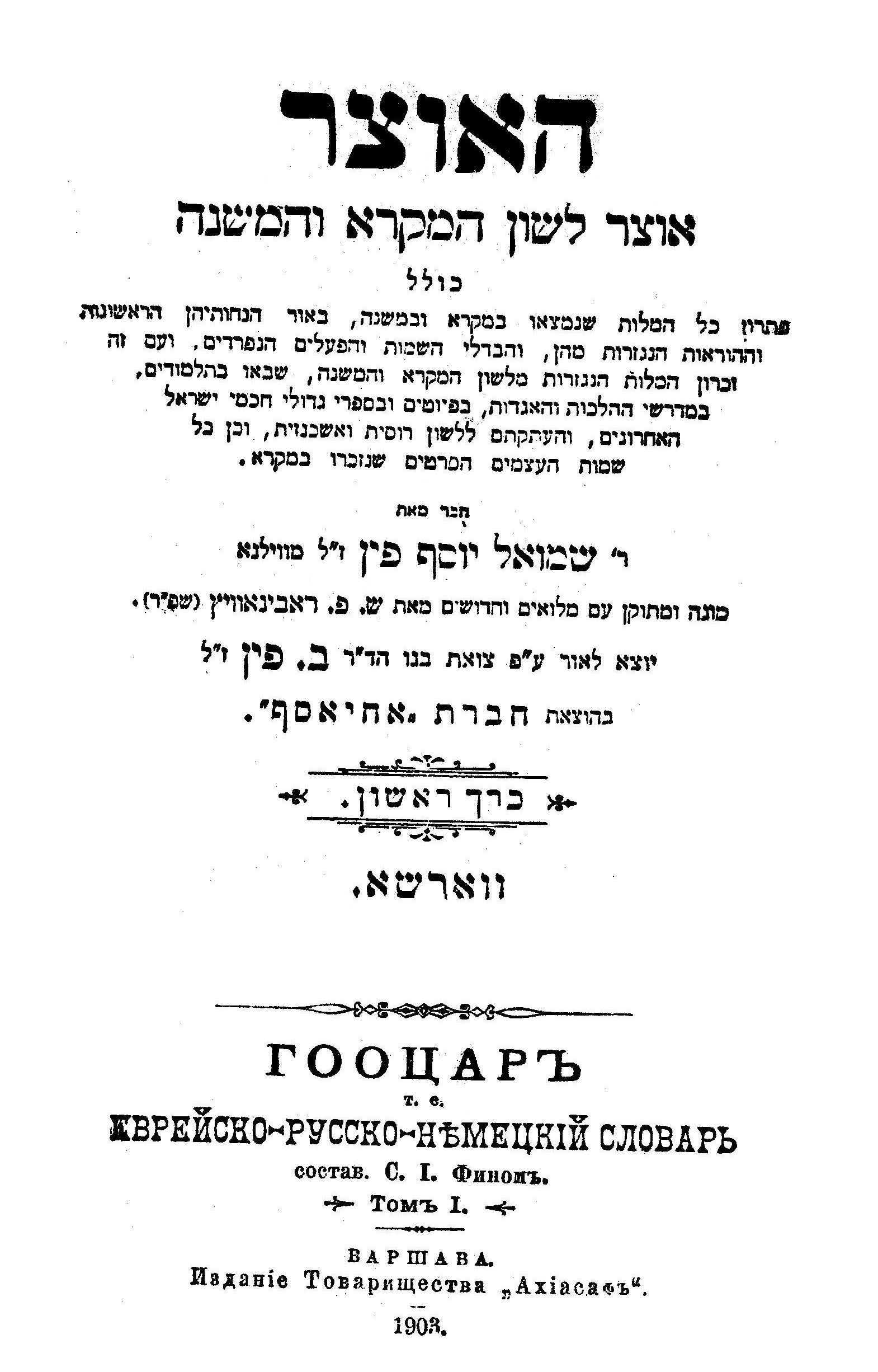
Title page of Ha-otsar (1903 edition)

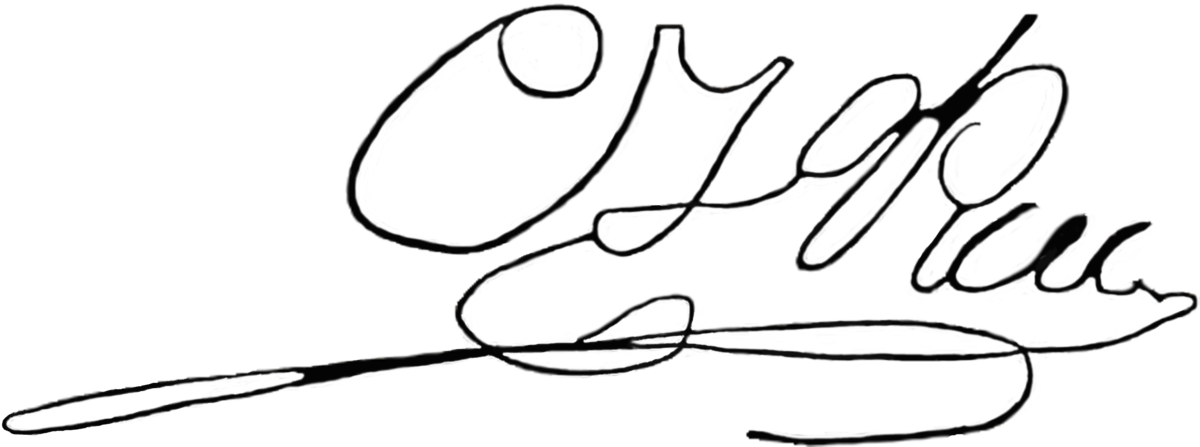
Samuel Joseph Finn's (Russian финѣ) Russian signature

- Imre emet [True Remarks]. Vilna. 1841. Two lectures (one delivered by the author; the other translated from German).
- Shenot dor va-dor [Years of Generations] (PDF). Königsberg. 1847. Chronology of Biblical history.
- Fuenn, Samuel Joseph (1847). Talmud leshon Rusyah [Learning the Language of Russia] (in Yiddish). Vilna. A Russian language textbook.
- Nidḥe Yisrael [Exiles of Israel]. Vilna. 1850. hdl:2027/uc1.a0001234624. A history of the Jews and Jewish literature from the destruction of the Temple to 1170.
- Kiryah ne'emanah [The Faithful City]. Vilna. 1860. hdl:2027/hvd.32044012709903. A history of the Jews of Vilna, with an introduction by Mattityahu Strashun.
- Divre ha-yamim li-vene Yisrael [History of the Children of Israel]. Vilna. 1871–77. hdl:2027/hvd.32044014489801. A history of the Jews and their literature, in two volumes (the first dealing with the period extending from the banishment of Jehoiachin to the death of Alexander the Great; the second from Alexander's death to the installation of Simon Maccabeus as high priest and prince).
- Sofre Yisrael [Writers of Israel]. Vilna. 1871. hdl:2027/uc1.b4213434. Selected letters of Hebrew stylists from Ḥasdai ibn Shaprut to modern times.
- Bustanai [Bostanai]. 880-03Bustinaĭ. Vilna. 1872. hdl:2027/uc1.g0001601632. A fictional narrative based on people from the time of the Geonim, translated a German work of the same name by Lehmann.
- Ma'amar 'al ha-hashgaḥah [Treatise on Providence]. Vilna. 1872. Hebrew translation of Moses Mendelssohn's Die Sache Gottes.
- Ha-ḥilluf [The Exchange] (PDF). Vilna. 1873. Hebrew adaptation of Lehmann's Graf und Jude.
- Ḥukke 'avodat ha-tsava [Military Labour Laws]. Ḥuḳat ha-tsava ha-ḥadashah. Vilna. 1874. hdl:2027/hvd.32044102322211. Russian laws relating to conscription.
- Ya'akov Tirado [Jacob Tirado]. Jakob Tirado.Hebrew. Vilna. 1874. hdl:2027/hvd.hwmnnz. A Hebrew translation of a German novel by Philippson.
- Ha-tefillin [The Phylacteries]. Vilna. 1874. hdl:2027/uc1.$b154289. A Hungarian village tale by Hurwitz, translated from German into Hebrew.
- "Le-toledot R. Sa'adyah Gaon" [Materials for the Biography of Saadia Gaon]. Ha-Karmel. 2. 1871.
- "Ḥakhme Yisrael bi-Krim ve-gedole Yisrael be-Turkiya" [Jewish Scholars in Crimea and Turkey]. Ha-Karmel. 1861. Biographies of notable Jews of Crimea and Turkey in the 14th–15th centuries.
- Safah le-ne'emanim [Language for the Faithful]. Vilna. 1881. hdl:2027/uc1.a0000013862. Essay on the value and significance of the Hebrew language and literature in the development of culture among Russian Jews.
- Ha-yerushshah [The Inheritance]. Vilna. 1884. Hebrew adaptation of Honigmann's Die Erbschaft.
- Ha-otsar [The Treasury]. Vol. 1. Warsaw. 1884. hdl:2027/uc1.$b109423. A Hebrew and Aramaic dictionary giving Russian and German equivalents for the words of the Bible, Mishnah, and Midrashim.
- Keneset Yisrael [Assembly of Israel]. Vol. 1. Warsaw. 1886–90. hdl:2027/hvd.hnrlr2. Biographical lexicon of notable Jews.

=== Unpublished work ===
Fuenn left in manuscript form a treatise on Jewish law entitled Darkhei Hashem ('The Paths of God'), written as a response to Alexander McCaul anti-Jewish work The Old Paths. Other unpublished works included Ha-moreh ba-emek ('The Teacher in the Valley'), a commentary on Maimonides' Moreh nevukhim; Mishna berurah ('Clarified Teaching') and Ḥokhmat ḥakhamim ('Wisdom of the Sages'), commentaries on the Mishnah; Ha-Torah veha-zeman ('The Torah and Time'), on the evolution of laws and regulations; Sum sekhel, glosses on the Bible; Pirḥe Levanon ('Flowers of Lebanon'), a collection of verses; and Bein ha-perakim ('Between the Chapters'), a commentary on Pirkei de-Rabbi Eliezer.
