= Reuben Asher Braudes =

Lithuanian-born Hebrew novelist and journalist

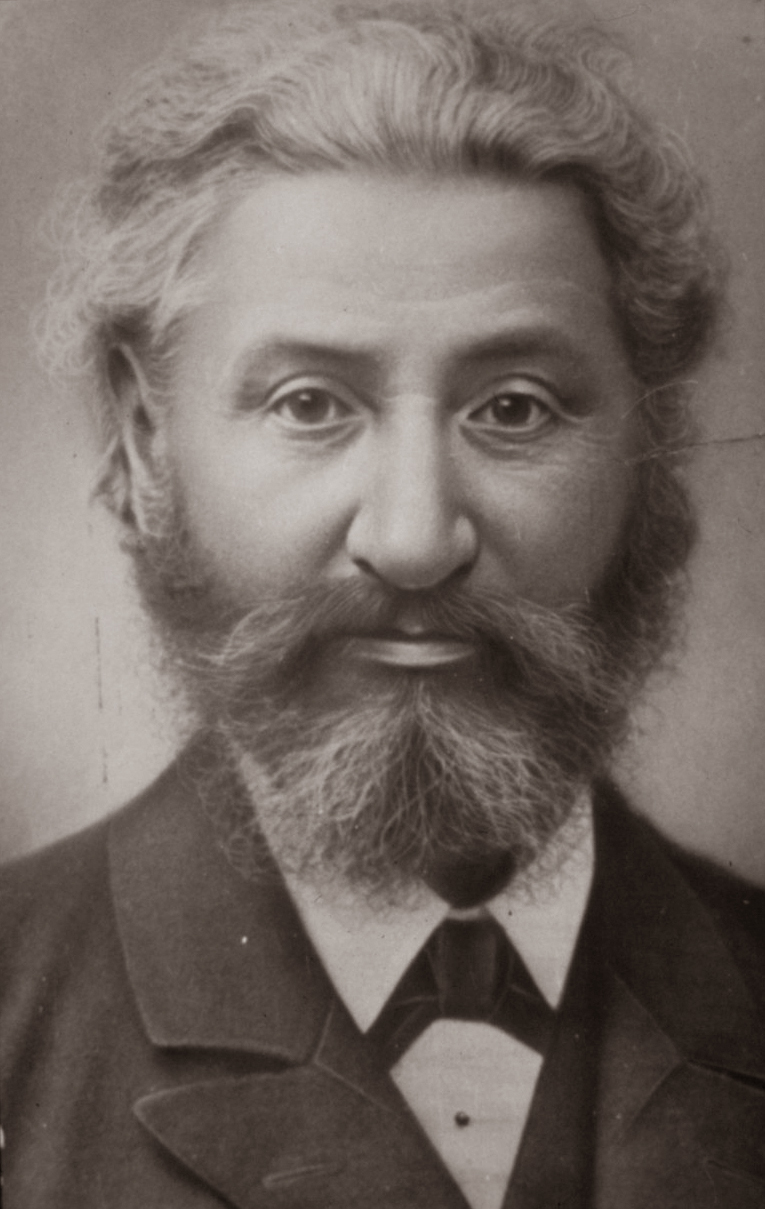
- R. A. Braudes in 1900
- Born: 22 September 1851; Vilna
- Died: 18 October 1902 (aged 51); Vienna
- Writing career
- Language: Hebrew

Reuben Asher Braudes (Hebrew: רְאוּבֵן אָשֵׁר בּראודס; Russian: Реувен Ашер Браудес; 22 September 1851, Vilna – 18 October 1902, Vienna) was a Lithuania-born Hebrew novelist and journalist.

== Biography ==
Educated based on the traditional Talmudic lines of Jewish education, he came early under the influence of the Maskilim.

== Literary career ==
In 1868, Braudes became a contributor to Ha-Lebanon, a Hebrew weekly published by Brill Publishers in Mainz, and for several years he devoted his pen to topics of the day and to criticism. It was as a novelist, however, that he was to make a mark in Hebrew literature. In 1874, he published in The Dawn, a monthly edited by Peretz Smolenskin at Vienna. His first story, The Mysteries of the Zephaniah Family, a tale of great promise from its style and vivid descriptions. The next year appeared his second novel, The Repentant, which was followed by Religion and Life, treating of Jewish life and published in The Morning Light, issued by Gottlober at Lviv in 1875.

Another novel, The Two Extremes, appeared in Lviv in 1885. In this book Braudes pictures in vivid colors the Orthodox and Reform camps in modern Israel.

== Zionist activism ==
In 1882, at the time of the anti-Semitic riots in Russia, Braudes joined the Zionist movement and became one of its foremost advocates. To foster this idea he went to Romania, and in Bucharest began the publication of Yehudit, a weekly in Yiddish. At the end of two years, however, Braudes was expelled from the country.

In 1891, he went to Kraków, and started a weekly in Hebrew, The Time. This paper existed for nine months, when, for lack of funds, its publication was suspended.

Theodor Herzl appointed Braudes editor of the Yiddish edition of his weekly, Die Welt.
