= Ha-Asif =

Hebrew-language yearly journal

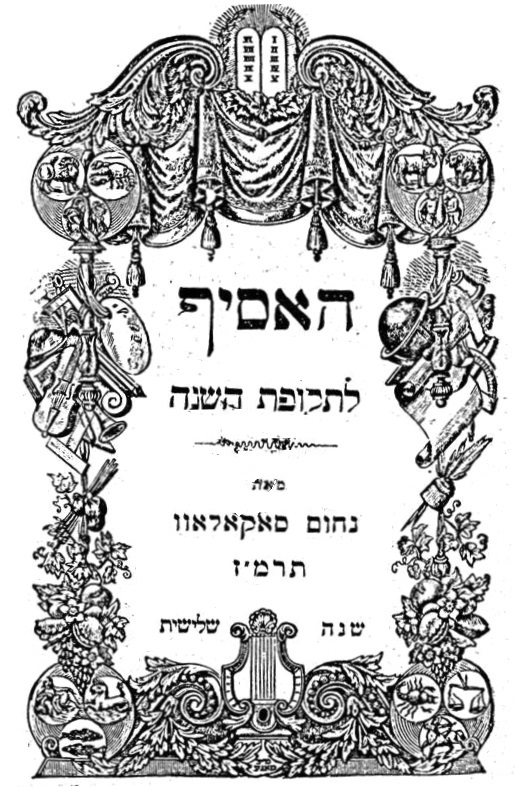
- Title page of Ha-Asif, AM 5647 [1887]
- Editor: Naḥum Sokolow
- Frequency: Annual
- Total circulation (1884): 12,000
- Founder: Naḥum Sokolow
- First issue: 1884
- Final issue: 1894
- Based in: Warsaw, Congress Poland
- Language: Hebrew

Ha-Asif (Hebrew: הָאָסִיף, lit. 'The Harvest') was a Hebrew-language yearly journal, published in Warsaw by Naḥum Sokolow.

Its first volume appeared in 1884; it continued to appear regularly every year until 1889, when the fifth volume came out at the end instead of at the beginning of the Jewish year. The sixth and last volume appeared in 1893. The Sefer Zikkaron, a biographical dictionary of contemporary Jewish authors, was published as a supplement to the fifth volume of Ha-Asif.

The six volumes of Ha-Asif form an important collection of literary, historical, biographical, and popular scientific essays. They also contain poems, sketches, and novels, while its yearly reviews, obituaries, and descriptions of Russo-Jewish communities are of great value to Jewish biography and history. Among its contributors were Sholem Aleichem, Salomon Buber, Joseph Hayyim Caro, Abraham Shalom Friedberg, David Frischmann, Judah Leib Gordon, Avrom Ber Gotlober, Abraham Harkavy, Isaac Kaminer, Salomon Mandelkern, Mordechai Tzvi Maneh, I. L. Peretz, Joseph Elijah Triwosch, and Isaac Hirsch Weiss.
