= Hebrew Socialist Union in London =

Jewish socialist organization

The Hebrew Socialist Union in London (Hebrew: Agudas HaSozialistim Holvrim BeLondon) was a Jewish socialist organisation in London, United Kingdom. Although the membership of the organisation never exceeded forty, it played a significant role in mobilizing Jewish labour activism during its short span of existence. It was the first Jewish socialist organisation in England and its journal HaEmes ('The Truth') was the first Jewish socialist periodical.

The association was founded by ten Jewish immigrants from Russia on May 9, 1876. The founding meeting took place at 40, Gun Street, Spitalfields. The group was led by Aaron Liebermann, who became the secretary of the organisation. Other founding members included Lazar Goldenberg (who, along with Liebermann, had worked with the Russian publication Vpered!) and Isaac Stoune.

In total the Hebrew Socialist Union held 26 meetings during 1876. Meetings were held in Yiddish. The statues of the organisation, edited by Liebermann, were published in Hebrew.

Liebermann, who himself was a former Orthodox Jew and a drop-out of the rabbinical college of Vilna, adopted a staunchly internationalist and anti-religious approach. He sought to build a movement which would unite Jewish workers around a socialist, not religious, identity. Furthermore, the Hebrew Socialist Union sought to propagandize for socialism amongst non-Jews as well. For example, Liebermann hoped to build unity between Irish and Jewish immigrant workers.

The group began holding public meetings across Spitalfields in the year of its foundation. Hundreds of workers attended a meeting held at Goodman's Fields on August 26, 1876. After the August 26 meeting, a Jewish tailors union was formed as an offshoot of the Hebrew Socialist Union. This was the second time a Jewish tailors' union had been formed in London. The tailors' union had 80 members at its peak.

Some demands of the Hebrew Socialist Union, such as a call for a ten-hour working day, were well received amongst the Jewish community. But the organisation found itself at loggerheads with the leaders of the Jewish community once it had begun to protest high fees for synagogue marriages. The Jewish Chronicle, an organ of the Anglo-Jewish establishment, called the representatives of the Hebrew Socialist Union as non-Jews, 'missionaries' and 'enemies'.

In September 1876 tensions between its socialist core and religious minded workers erupted inside the tailors' union. The union declared itself independent from the Hebrew Socialist Union. At the a meeting of the union, Liebermann was physically assaulted by the religious unionists. Later, the treasurer of the tailors' union disappeared, along with the union funds. Verbal attacks against the Hebrew Socialist Union on behalf of local rabbis persisted, and splits emerged between the founders of the organisation. In December 1876, Liebermann left England. By that time the organisation had disappeared.
