= Vpered! (1873) =

Vpered! was a political journal which was founded by the Russian populist émigré Pyotr Lavrov. It was first published in Zurich in 1873 and then in London from 1874 until 1877. Its title was Вперед! in the Cyrillic alphabet, meaning Forward!, which has been used by many other political journals since. Its staff included Aaron Liebermann, who wrote and did typesetting. An example of its content is an account of strikes by Jewish workers in the tobacco factories of Vilna which was written by Lieberman's younger friend Aaron Zundelevich, but published anonymously in 1875 as the correspondence was illegal.
