= Olga Novikoff =

Russian writer and journalist

- Ольга Новикова
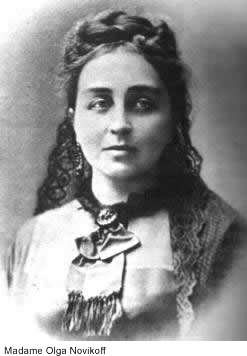
- Novikoff, c. 1880
- Born: Olga Alekseyevna Kireyeva (Ольга Алексеевна Киреева); 29 April [O.S. 17] 1840; Moscow, Russian Empire
- Died: 21 April 1925 (aged 84); London, United Kingdom

Olga Alekseyevna Novikoff (Note: Also transliterated as Novikova) (Russian: Ольга Алексеевна Новикова; 29 April [O.S. 17] 1840 – 21 April 1925) was an expatriate White Russian author and journalist in Britain.

Notable works include The M.P. for Russia.

Her grandson was Russian-born British actor Richard Marner (born Alexander Molchanoff).
