= Lunna, Belarus =

Lunna
- Лунно (Belarusian); Лунна (Russian)
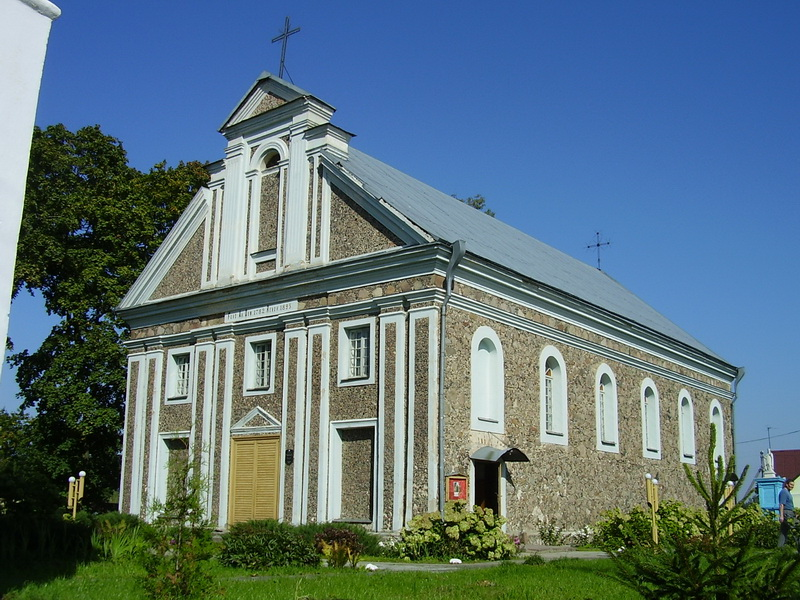
- Saint Anne Church

- Location within Belarus
- Coordinates: 53°26′59″N 24°16′42″E
- Country: Belarus
- Voblast: Grodno Region
- Raion: Masty District
- First mentioned: 1503
- Elevation: 115 m (377 ft)

Population (2017)
  - Total: 880
- Time zone: UTC+3 (EET)
- Postal code: 231606
- Area code: +375 1515
- License plate: 4

Lunna or Lunno (Belarusian: Лунна, Russian: Лунно, Polish: Łunna) is a town in the Grodno Region in western Belarus.

== History ==
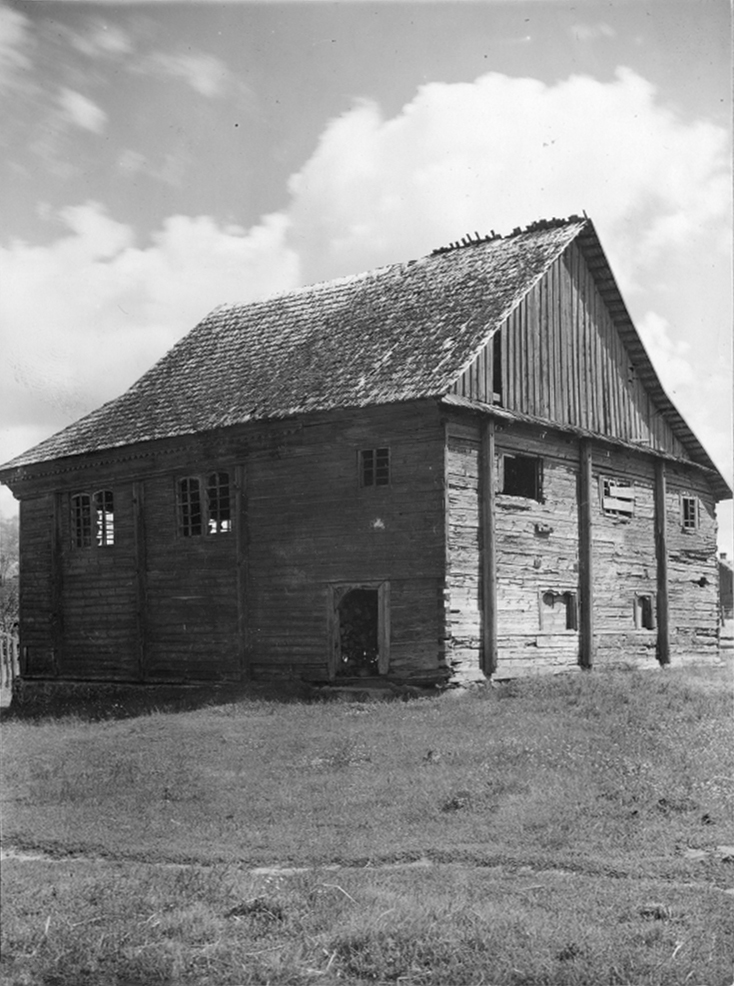
Synagogue of Lunna, 1930

Łunna was granted town rights in 1530 by Queen consort of Poland Bona Sforza. It was a royal town, administratively located in the Grodno County in the Troki Voivodeship of the Polish–Lithuanian Commonwealth.

In the interwar period, Łunna, as it was known in Polish, was administratively located in the Grodno County in the Białystok Voivodeship of Poland. In the 1921 census, 59.6% people declared Polish nationality, 39.2% declared Jewish nationality and 1.2% declared Belarusian nationality.

The town was under Soviet control in the first stage of World War II, from September 1939 to June 1941 when the German army occupied the town. At that time, the Jewish community of Lunna was around 1,300, with another 400 living in Wola. From October 1941 to November 1942, Łunna and Wola Jews were confined to a ghetto where five to seven families lived in each house. The Jews were brutalized, conscripted for slave labor, and punished severely for any infraction. Many died in the ghetto. In November 1942, ghetto residents were transported to the Kielbasin transit camp where they lived for a month and then sent to Auschwitz. Almost all died there, most immediately. Two, Zalman Gradowski and Josef Dereszynski, led an armed uprising against the guards in Auschwitz in October 1944, an uprising in which three other Lunna residents participated. All died in the revolt. In all, a few more than a dozen Jews from Lunna survived the war.

== See also ==
- List of cities in Belarus#Hrodna Province
