= Statue of Yuri Gagarin, London =

Sculpture after Anatoly Novikov

Coordinates: 51.47731°N 0.002345°W

Yuri Gagarin
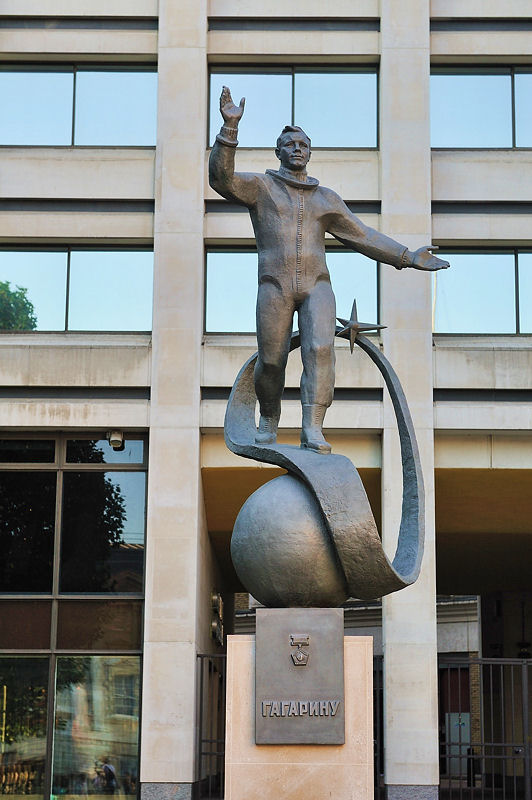
- The statue in 2011, while on display outside the headquarters of the British Council
- Artist: After Anatoly Novikov
- Year: 2010 (after an original of 1984)
- Medium: Zinc
- Location: Science Museum, London

The statue of Yuri Gagarin at the Science Museum in London is a zinc statue showing the cosmonaut wearing a spacesuit and standing atop a globe. The 3.5-metre (11 ft) high statue is a replica of an original by Anatoly Novikov in Lyubertsy, where Gagarin was trained as a foundry worker. It was a gift to the British Council from the Russian space agency Roscosmos as a part of several cultural events commemorating the 50th anniversary of the first human spaceflight.

== History ==
The figure was originally unveiled on 14 July 2011 at a temporary location in the Mall, close to Admiralty Arch and facing the statue of Captain James Cook. This location was chosen as it was where Gagarin first met the British prime minister Harold Macmillan. It was later moved to the Royal Observatory, Greenwich, at a site overlooking the Prime Meridian line, and was unveiled at the new location on 7 March 2013. There had been an unsuccessful proposal to move it to Manchester.

In 2025, the statue was put on display in the space gallery at the Science Museum, London.

The original statue in Lyubertsy

The statue's unveiling on 14 July 2011; pictured are Elena Gagarina and Prince Michael of Kent

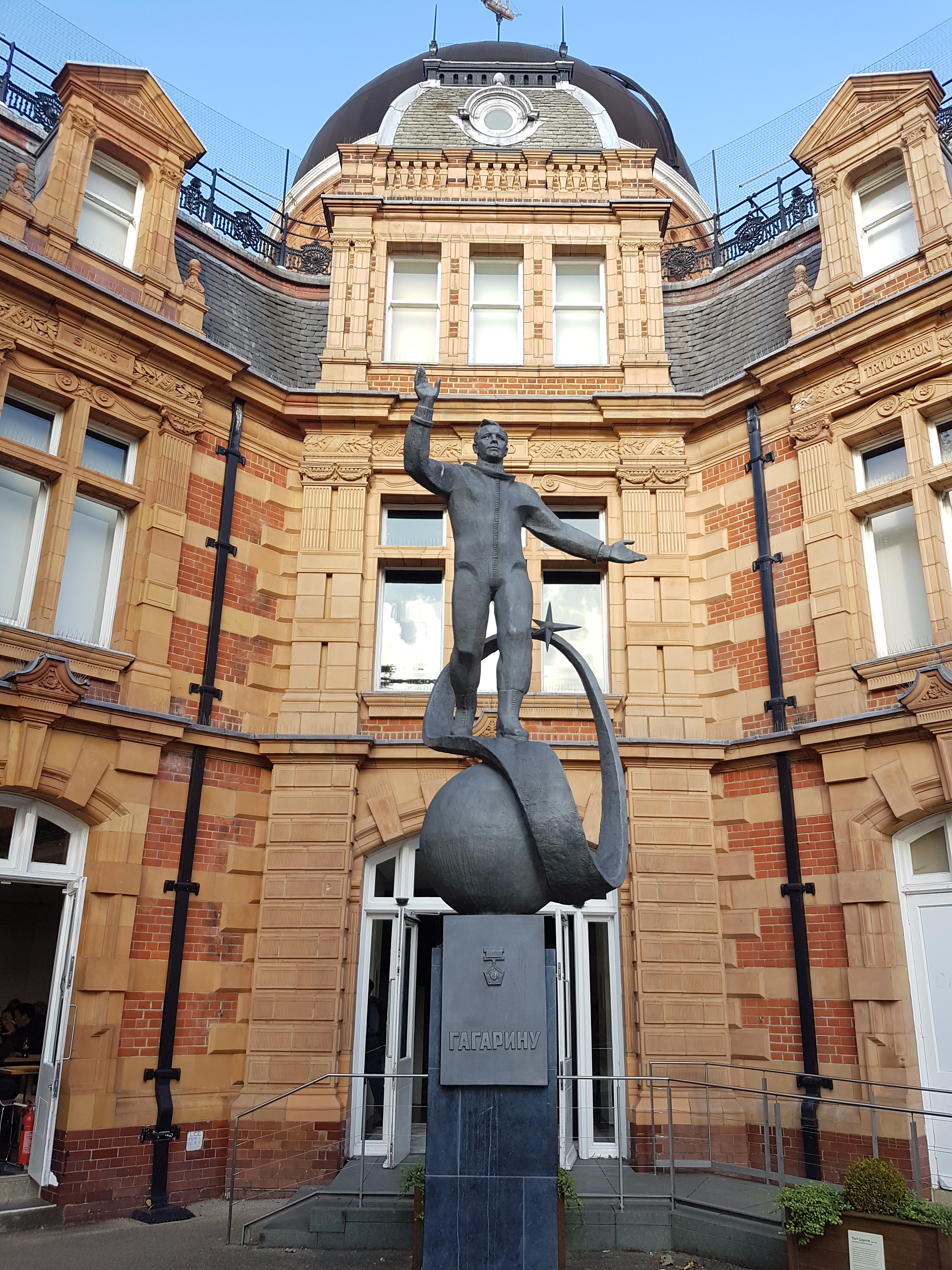
The statue at its second location in Greenwich, in 2016

The statue in the Science Museum in 2025

== See also ==
- Monument to Yuri Gagarin – large statue in Moscow
