= Isaac Kaminer =

Isaac ben Abraham Kaminer
- יצחק בן אברהם קאמינר
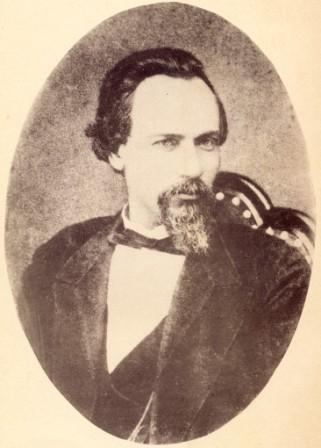
- Born: 1834; Levkiev, Russian Empire
- Died: 30 March 1901 (aged 66–67); Bern, Switzerland
- Education: University of Kiev
- Occupation: Physician
- Writing career
- Language: Hebrew

Isaac ben Abraham Kaminer (Hebrew: יִצְחָק בֶּן אַבְרָהָם קַאמִינֶר, Yitsḥak ben Avraham Kaminer; 1834 – 30 March 1901) was a Russian-Jewish Hebrew-language poet, satirist, and physician.

== Biography ==
Isaac ben Abraham Kaminer was born in May 1834 in Levkiev in right-bank Ukraine, near Zhitomir. Drawn into the Haskalah movement in his youth, he left Ukraine for Vilna, where he associated with maskilim, in particular with Samuel Joseph Fuenn. He rejoined his wife and newborn child in Zhitomir in 1854, where he taught at the government school for Jews until 1859. He studied mathematics and medicine at the University of Kiev, graduating as a physician in 1865.

While in Kiev, Kaminer inclined toward socialism and joined the circles of Aaron Liebermann and Judah Leib Levin. His two daughters married revolutionaries and his home served as a meeting place and hideout. Russian revolutionary leader Pavel Axelrod, who married Kaminer's daughter, claimed he first came across Das Kapital in Kaminer's home. After the pogroms of the 1880s he joined the Ḥibbat Zion movement and became an ardent Zionist.

Kaminer served as a physician in Kiev until the end of the 1870s. Informants, searches, and investigations, as well as the deaths of his sons and his own financial decline, forced him to leave Kiev. He moved to Monasterishche in the Chernigov Governorate in 1880, where he worked as physician for the governate's administrative council. He was later made a member of a commission for the investigation of the conditions of the Russian Jews, and he so displeased the officials by his impassioned defence of his coreligionists that he was ordered back to the government of Kiev. In 1901 Kaminer's health broke down, and he went for medical treatment to Bern, where he died as the result of an operation.

== Work ==
Kaminer wrote verse satires for the Hebrew socialist papers Ha-Emet and Asefat Ḥakhamim, criticizing supporters of the Haskalah, the Ḥasidim, and rich communal leaders. Among the most noteworthy of his contributions to Hebrew periodicals were "Baraitot de Rabbi Yitsḥaḳ," a series of satirical articles, published in Ha-Kol; "Mi-Sidduro Shel Rabbi Yitsḥak," in Ha-Shaḥar; and a series of elegies bewailing the sufferings of the Russian Jews, in Ha-Asif.

In 1878, he published Kinot mi-Sidduram shel Benei Dan (קינות מסידורם של בני-דן), a satirical poem on the social condition of the Russian Jews, and Seder Kapparot le-Va'al Takse (סדר כפרות לבעל טקסי), a satirical poem against the farmers of the meat-tax in Russia. A poem written by him on his death-bed entitled "Viddui" was published in Ha-Shiloaḥ in January 1902.

=== Selected publications ===
- Kaminer, Isaac (1905). Ahad Ha'am; Rawnitzki, Yehoshua Ḥana (eds.). Shirei Yitsḥak ben Avraham doktor Kaminer. Odessa: Hotsa'at Va'ad Ḥovevei Tsiyon. OCLC 19154966.
- Kaminer, Isaac (1878). Seder Kapparot le-Va'al Takse [Procedure of Ritual Atonement for a Tax Man] (in Hebrew). Warsaw. OCLC 25229694.
- Kaminer, Isaac (1878). Kinot mi-Sidduram shel Benei Dan [Laments from the Prayer Book of the Tribe of Dan] (in Hebrew). Vienna: Georg Berg. OCLC 198935656.
