= David Radner =

- Born: 22 February 1848; Vilna, Vilna Governorate, Russian Empire
- Died: 11 November 1901 (aged 53); Vilna, Vilna Governorate, Russian Empire
- Writing career
- Language: Hebrew
- Literary movement: Haskalah

David ben Yirmiyahu Radner (Hebrew: דוד בן ירמיהו ראַדנער; 22 February 1848 – 11 November 1901) was a Lithuanian Jewish writer and translator.

He translated into Hebrew Friedrich Schiller's William Tell (1878) and Don Carlos (1879), Salomon Hermann Mosenthal's Deborah (1880), and David Cassel's Lehrbuch der jüdischen Geschichte und Literatur (1886).
