= Peretz Smolenskin =

Russian writer

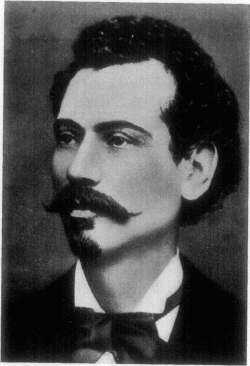
Peretz Smolenskin

Peretz (Peter) Smolenskin (Hebrew: פרץ (פטר) סמולנסקין; 25 February 1842 – 1 February 1885) was a Russian-born Zionist and Hebrew writer.

== Biography ==
Peretz Smolenskin was born in Monastyrshchina, Mogilev Governorate, Russian Empire (in present-day Smolensk Oblast, Russia). His family came from Smolensk. His older brother was seized by the Czar's army and never returned. His father, falsely accused of a crime, was a fugitive for over two years and died when Peretz was eleven. At the age of 12, he left home to study at yeshiva for five years. He began reading secular books and learning Russian under the influence of the Haskalah movement.

Smolenskin traveled through southern Russia and the Crimea, supporting himself by singing in choirs and preaching in synagogues. In 1862 he settled in Odessa where he studied music and languages and taught Hebrew. He published his first story in 1867. In the course of his travels through Romania, Germany and Bohemia, he acquired Turkish nationality.

== Literary career ==
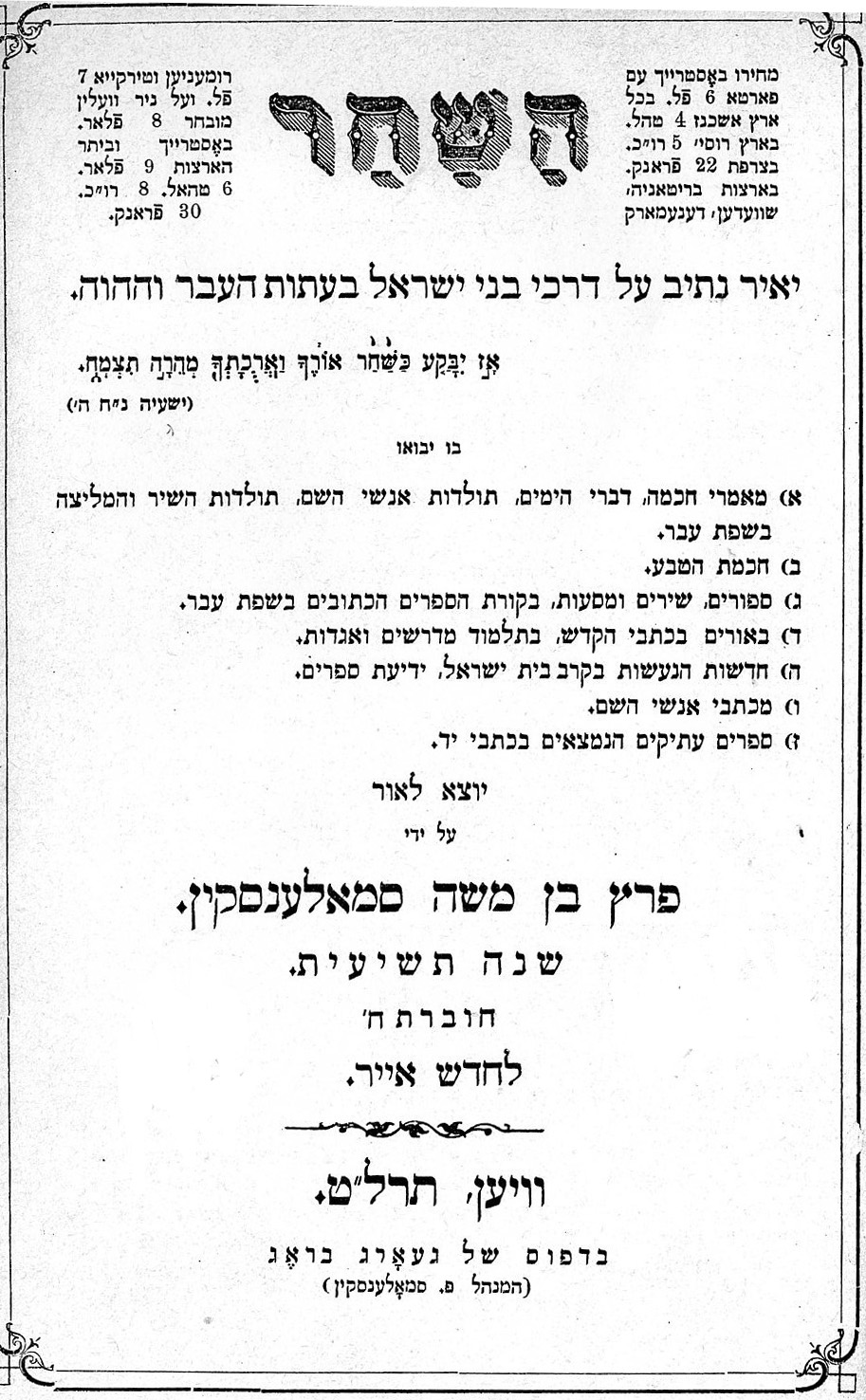
Front page of HaShachar

In Vienna, Smolenskin founded HaShachar (The Dawn), a Hebrew journal that became a literary platform for the Haskalah movement and early Jewish nationalism. He also wrote novels and short stories in Hebrew.

He was stricken with tuberculosis in 1883 and died on February 1, 1885, in Merano, Italy. He completed his last novel, The Inheritance, shortly before his death.

Smolenskin was a leader in the revolt of young Jews against medievalism and a strong voice for Jewish nationalism. His Hebrew periodical, The Dawn (Ha-shahar השחר), was highly influential in these spheres. Shortly before his death he was associated with Laurence Oliphant and became deeply interested in the establishment of a Jewish state in Palestine. Smolenskin was among the first of the Jewish nationalists to disassociate Messianic ideals from theological concomitants.

== Published works ==
His six novels create a kaleidoscope of Jewish life in which he rejects the notion of the westernized Jew.

=== Hebrew ===
The Joy of the Goddess, Vienna, (Simchat Hanef) Ha-Shachar, 1872.

Burial of the Ass Vienna, (Kevurat Hamor קבורת חמור) Ha-Shachar, 1873.

Pride and Fall, Vienna, (Ga'on Va-Shever) Ha-Shahar, 1874.

The Reward of the Righteous, Vienna, Ha-Shahar, (Gemul Yesharim)1875.

The Wanderer in the Paths of Life, Vienna, (Ha-toeh be-darkhe ha-Hayyim, התועה בדרכי החיים) is the story of an orphan, Joseph, and his life in the ghetto. Ha-Shachar, 1876.

The Inheritance (Ha-yerushah הירושה), depicts life in Odessa and Romania. 1877–1884.

Collected Works, Vilna, Katzenelbogen, (Col Sifrei Peretz Smolenskin) 1901.

One Hundred Letters, Vilna, Katzenelbogen, (Meah Michtavim)1905.

The Reward, Vilna, Katzenelbogen, (Meah Michtavim)1910.

Articles, Smolenskin Foundation, (Ma'amarim) 1926.

Selected Stories & Articles, Dvir, (Mivhar Sipurim Ve-Ma'amarim) 1941.

=== Yiddish ===
The Wanderer in the Paths of Life, Warsaw, Sefer, 1927

== See also ==
- Hebrew literature
- Yiddish literature
