= Tartas (disambiguation) =

Tartas is a commune in the Landes department in Nouvelle-Aquitaine in southwestern France

It may also refer to:

- Tartas (river), a river in Novosibirsk Oblast, Russia, right tributary of the Om
- David de Castro Tartas (1630-1698), Portuguese Jewish printer in Amsterdam
- Isaac de Castro Tartas (ca. 1623–1647), a Marrano and Jewish martyr during the Inquisition

== See also ==
- Saint-Paul-de-Tartas, a commune in the Haute-Loire department in south-central France
- Tarta (disambiguation)
