= Amsterdam machzor =

Prayer book printed and decorated in 1670

The Amsterdam Machzor of 1670 was a heavily ornamented prayer book printed by Uri Phoebus ben Aaron Ha-levi (known also as Uri Witzenhausen).

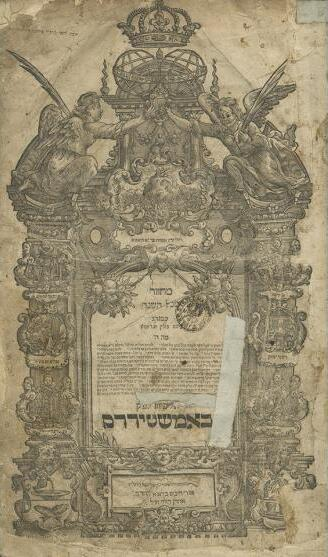
Machzor 1670 title

== History and Rite ==
Despite Uri Phoebus printing in Amsterdam after the printing houses of Menasseh Ben Israel and his son, and thereafter Immanuel Benveniste, the printing houses of Uri Phoebus and Joseph Athias turned Amsterdam into a major center for Hebrew printing. Following the two printers came David de Castro Tartas, Moses Mendez Coutinho, and thereafter the Proops dynasty, all of which strove to put out adorned and fine item editions of books. The 1670 Machzor is much earlier than those, and therefore a genre-setter in that regard.

The Machzor was also a first in that the German presses of Sulzbach, Wilhermsdorff, Dyherrnfurth, Prague, and Fürth put out editions in the stereotype of the 1670 Machzor; however, the recreation of the ambitious ornaments was never redone; therefore, the 1670 Amsterdam remains unique as a folio Machzor of the 17th century to use such ornaments (in the style of the Machzorim of the 16th century, such as the Venetian, Prague, and Sabbionetta-Cremona editions).

The 1670 was in the rite of Bohemia, Germany (east) and Poland, as was the bulk of Machzorim printed after 1675; printed at the peripheries was the Ma'agale Tsedek commentary, which was first printed at Venice 1567 by Giorgio de Cavalli, with elements of the Sabbionetta-Cremona 1556 printing of Benjamin ha-leṿi’ of Thessaloniki's commentary and elements of the Prague 1549-1550 edition with Abraham Ḳara’s commentary.

== Typography and Ornamentation ==
Aside from the ornamentation, the typography of the 1670 Machzor is remarkable as well. The first titles are ornamented with cherubs, angels, and mythological scenes; the second title pages are architecturally and decoratively ornamented; a thick frame is heavily decorated with cartouches, beveled-keystones (in the Italiante style) with the upper cartouche showing the astrological signs of the months with which the holidays therein are to take place. The bold fonts are reminiscent of the Prague font but modernized; the standard fonts are the Venetian fonts adapted for Ashkenazic patronage.

The opening words to many of the piyyutim are decorated with stars, metalworking elements of design, unfurling flags, flora, and plants; these are beautifying elements without any symbolic or religious meaning.
