= Uguy (lake) =

Lake in Russia

- Угуй
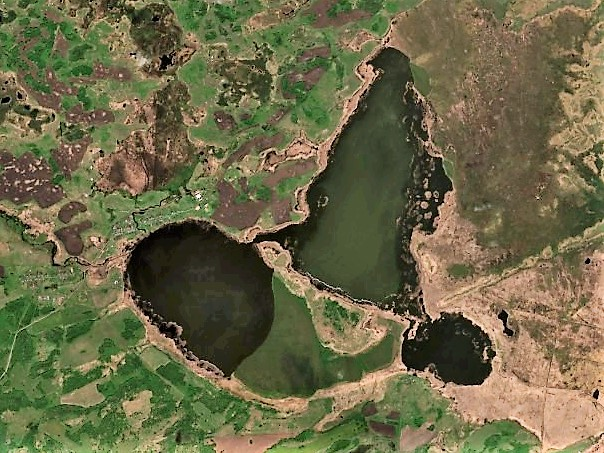
- Sentinel-2 picture of the lake

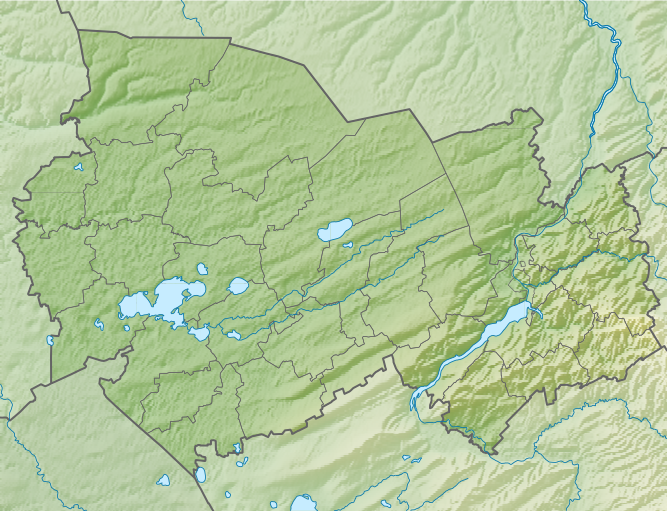
- Location within Novosibirsk Oblast Location within Russia
- Location: Baraba Lowland; West Siberian Plain
- Coordinates: 56°02′28″N 76°04′55″E
- Type: steppe lake
- Basin countries: Russia
- Max. length: 7.3 kilometers (4.5 mi)
- Max. width: 2.5 kilometers (1.6 mi)
- Surface area: 17.7 square kilometers (6.8 sq mi)
- Residence time: UTC+7
- Surface elevation: 111 meters (364 ft)
- Settlements: Uguy

Uguy (Russian: Угуй) is a lake in Ust-Tarksky District, Novosibirsk Oblast, Russian Federation.

The lake is located at the western end of the Oblast. The nearest inhabited place is Uguy, by the northwestern lakeshore. Ust-Tarka, the district capital, lies 62 kilometers (39 mi) to the SSW.

There is a 476 hectares (1,180 acres) protected area by the southern shore of the eastern part near Mirny village.

== Geography ==
Uguy lies in the Baraba Lowland, West Siberian Plain. It is the largest lake of Ust-Tarksky District. The lake has two wings or lobes, a western one and an eastern one, connected to each other by a 150 meters (490 ft) wide sound. The western wing is roughly oriented from northwest to southeast, and the eastern from north to south. The southeastern half of the western lobe is a swamp.

River Irtysh flows 80 kilometers (50 mi) to the west and the Om flows 45 kilometers (28 mi) to the southeast. Lake Chany lies 134 kilometers (83 mi) to the southeast.

== See also ==
- List of lakes of Russia
