= Mordecai Spector =

Russian Jewish novelist (1858–1925)

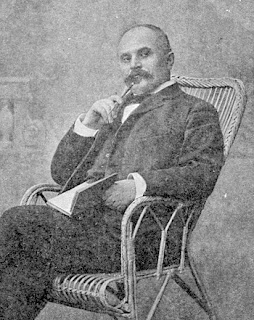
- Spector, late 19th century
- Born: May 5, 1858; Uman, Russian Empire
- Died: March 15, 1925 (aged 66); New York, US
- Citizenship: Russian; Polish (after 1918)
- Occupations: Writer; journalist
- Spouse(s): Berta Friedberg (married 1886); [unknown] Pinski (married before 1920)
- Writing career
- Pen name: Emes; Emeser Lamedvovnik
- Period: 19th century
- Genres: Yiddish novels, articles, short stories
- Movements: Yiddish realism, Haskalah

Mordecai Spector (also Mordechaj Spektor or Mordechai Spektor; 10 May 1858 – 15 March 1925) was a Yiddish novelist and editor from the Haskalah period. He is the author of about 50 realist novels and short stories depicting the life of ordinary people, workers, artisans, and Jewish families in his time. He is best known for his 1884 novel Der Yidisher Muzhik (The Jewish Farmer). He spent most of his life in Ukraine and moved to the United States in 1921.

== Life and works ==
Mordechai Spector was born on 10 May 1858, in Uman in the Russian Empire (now in Ukraine). He was born into a Hasidic family and received a strict religious education. During his teenage years, he met writer Yitskhok Yoyel Linetski and playwright Avrom Goldfadn, considered to be the father of Yiddish theater, and got involved with literature of the contemporary Haskalah movement (also called Jewish Enlightenment), which promoted a renewal of the Hebrew language but also a new interest in rationalism, enquiry, and secular culture. He started writing relatively young: his first work, Roman On a Nomen (Novel without a Title), appeared in installments in the St. Petersburg-based newspaper Yidishes Folksblat in 1883 when he was 24 years old. He also published multiple feuilletons in the same newspaper, ran by Alexander Zederbaum.

The following year he published his breakthrough work, a novel of Zionist inspiration entitled Der Yidisher Muzhik (The Jewish Farmer, 1884) which advocated for a return to the ancestral lands. Following the success of this second novel, Zederbaum invited Spector to join him in St. Petersburg as an assistant editor to the Yidishes Folksblat. Over the course of the following three years, he published numerous feuilletons, reviews, travel sketches, and short stories influenced by the realistic genre of the Haskalah. During his last year in St. Petersburg, in 1886, Spector married Berta Friedberg, the daughter of Hebrew and Yiddish author Abraham Shalom Friedberg. Herself a writer, she later collaborated with him on several works, and published under the pen name Isabella Grinevskaya multiple novels on education and against the idea of assimilation.

In 1887, following Spector's failed attempts to publish his own newspaper in St. Petersburg, he and his wife settled down in Warsaw and Spector started curating Hoyz-fraynd, a Yiddish literary anthology in five volumes published between 1887 and 1896 to whom both he andhis wife contributed, in addition to multiple other Yiddish authors. The collection also includes Spector's longest but unfinished historical novel Baal Shem-Tov, which pushed the boundaries of typical Haskalah literature and cast an innovative and positive light onto the beginnings of Hassidism. Starting from 1894, Spector collaborated with I. L. Peretz, Jacob Dinezon, and David Pinski on Di yontef bletlekh (Holiday Pages), another landmark Yiddish literary anthology, as well as Vokhedige bletlekh (Weekly Pages). He also worked intensively on Jewish folklore: he collected thousands of Jewish sayings, proverbs, incantations and other folk expressions submitted by his readers, and he published them in the Hoyz-fraynd as well as in a separate publication entitled Di yidishe shprikhverter (The Yiddish sayings).

Spector was very close to fellow Yiddish authors Sholem Aleichem and I. L. Peretz, who were also active in Warsaw. In early August 1899 (according to N. Mayzil), Spector and Peretz were arrested together "because of their presence at illegal meetings of labor revolutionaries".

Over the years, Spector contributed to a multitude of Yiddish newspapers and anthologies: Der Fraynd, Hilf, Der Yid (Kraków 1899–1902, in which he published, among others, his short stories Kalikes, A streik von Kapzunem - A strike of the poor, Brilen - Eyeglasses), Di Yidishe Folkstseitung (The Jewish Newspaper) and its supplement Froyen-velt, Ladies' World (1902–1903 with Dr. Kh. D. Hurvits), Moment, Tog, Veg, Die Zeit (Vilnius 1906), Freytag (Warsaw 1907), Undzer Lebn (1907–1909 with Sch. Hochberg), Di naye velt (from 1909, later merged with Warsaw's Moment), and others. Spector was extremely productive, and was the only Yiddish author of his generation to be able to live entirely off of his writing.

As World War I began and the German army started marching on Warsaw, Spector moved to Odessa (1914) where he continued his literary work, which made him famous all across Europe. Although information about his first marriage is scarce, it is known that in this period he remarried with a sister of his friend and fellow author David Pinski's wife. As the war progressed and the 1917 Russian Revolution began, life conditions became extremely harsh and Spector's health worsened. In 1920, Spector and his second wife escaped Ukraine and travelled through Romania, Hungary, Yugoslavia, Italy, Switzerland, and France to make their way to a ferry to the United States. During their travel, local Jewish communities enthusiastically welcomed Spector as a great author.

Spectors reached New York in the fall of 1921, and Spector continued working in the literary and journalistic field. In particular, he published numerous short stories, feuilletons, and reportages in the Yidishes Tageblat, including Von jener velt, Soides, Der Groisser Jakhsen, Helden fun der Zat, Yidishe Studenten, Varblondzete, Dem Apikoires vab.

== Legacy ==
In his last few years in New York, Spector published Geshikhten auf Brazlav as well as his autobiography Mayn Lebn (My Life), published posthumously in 1927, which is believed to have great literary, historical, and cultural value. Spector died in New York on 15 March 1925. He is buried in the "Honor Row" of the Workers Circle section in Old Mount Carmel Cemetery in Queens. Situated between the graves of Yiddish writers Bernard Gorin and Michael Baranoff, his name can no longer be read on the headstone. It can be identified by the inscription that remains, which reads "Zayn gants lebn: yidish - yidn - yidishkayt" (His entire life was Yiddish, Jews, and Yiddish culture). He was credited as an "excellent observer of reality", and his works reproduce the colloquial speech of Jewish families in everyday situations. He was also considered "a pioneer of Yiddish folklore and of Yiddish writing for children", and he was one among the first Yiddish authors to collect and publish Jewish proverbs and sayings.
