= Kol Mevasser =

19th century Yiddish periodical

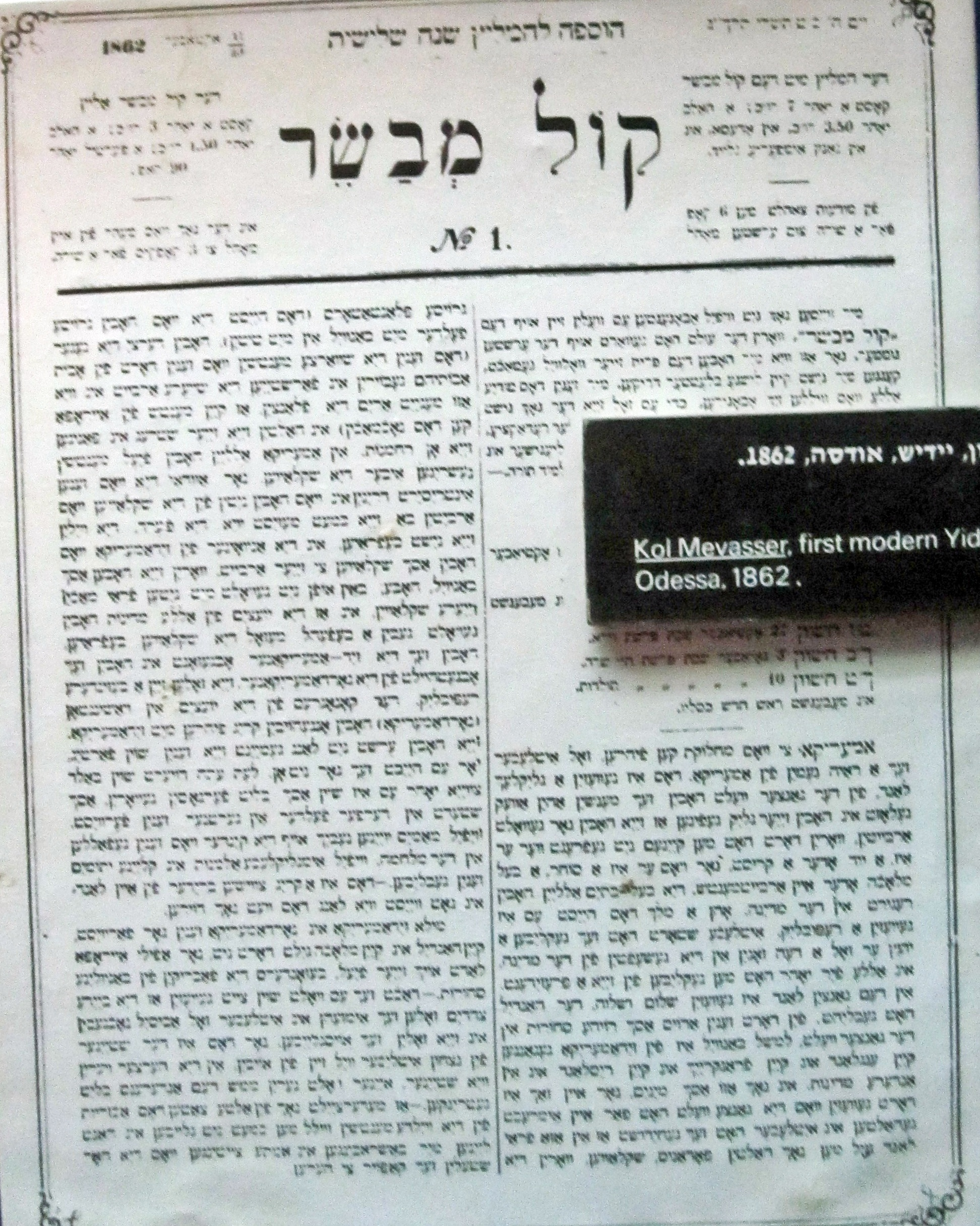
Kol Mevasser, First modern Yiddish journal, Odessa, 1862

Kol Mevasser (Yiddish: קול מבשר) was a Yiddish-language periodical that appeared from October 11, 1862 into 1872. It served as a supplement to the Hebrew weekly HaMelitz, providing scientific information in a Western style. It is considered by Sol Liptzin and others to be the most important early Yiddish-language periodical (although by no means the first: the short-lived Die Kuranten in Amsterdam predated it by centuries).

== History ==
Founded by Alexander Zederbaum as a supplement to his Hebrew-language weekly Ha-Melitz, during its last three years Kol Mevasser functioned independently. Unlike any earlier Yiddish publication, it circulated over a wide territory, with readers throughout Eastern Europe, but was based on the Southeastern ("Ukrainish") Yiddish dialect, indigenous to the region of its production (Odessa).

Coverage included events both in the Jewish and gentile world, and extended to science, education, history, geography, and literature. It ran biographies of famous rabbis, reviewed Yiddish writers such as Israel Aksenfeld, Solomon Ettinger, and A. B. Gotlober, and launched the careers of a generation of Yiddish writers.

It published the first Yiddish-language fiction of Mendele Mocher Sforim, a novella called Dos kleine mentshele (The Little Man), with the first installment appearing in November 1863. Yitzhok Yoel Linetzky got his start in Kol Mevasser in 1867, and it was the first to publish Yiddish poetry by Abraham Goldfaden, who, like Mendele, had already published in Hebrew.

The decade-long run and relatively professional editorial standards of Kol Mevasser helped to standardize Yiddish spelling, enrich its vocabulary, establish patterns of written usage, and generally increase the prestige of the language.
