= Johann Leusden =

Dutch Calvinist theologian and orientalist

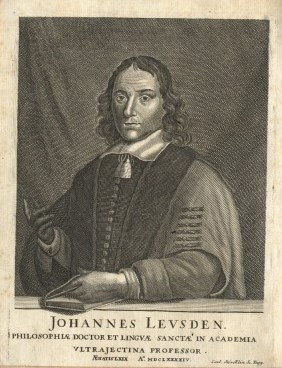
Johannes Leusden

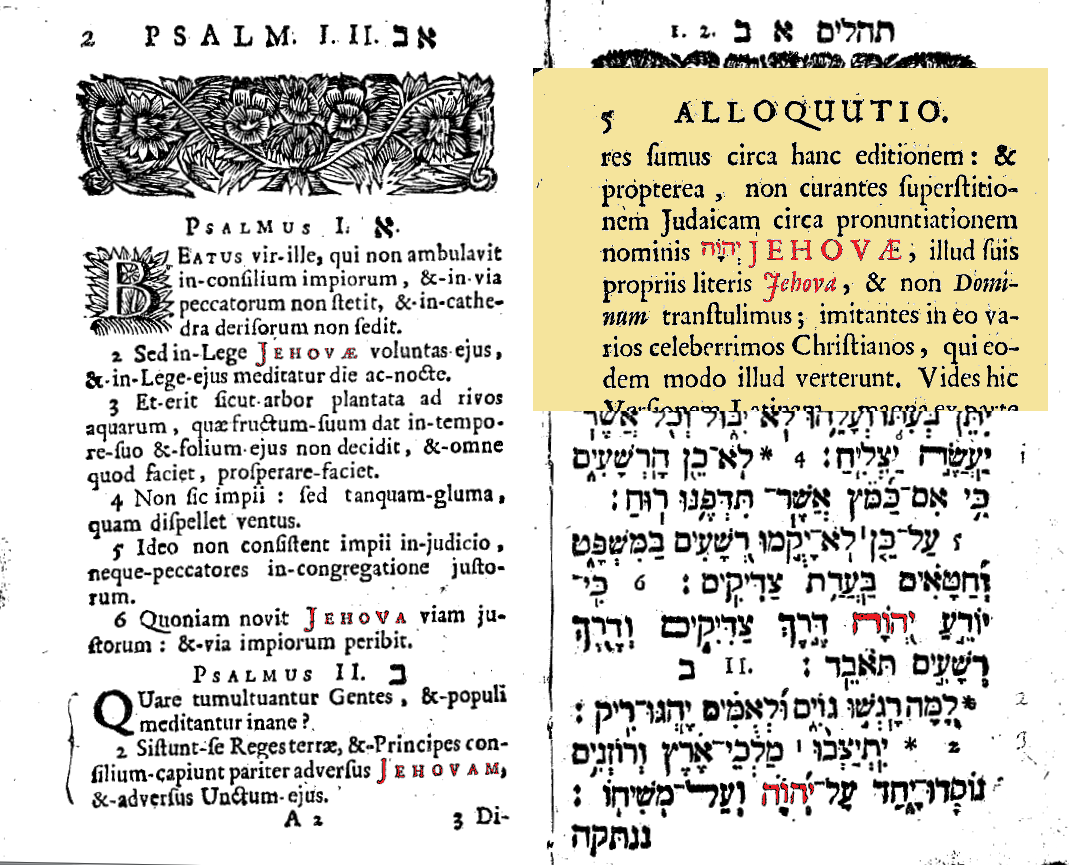
Excerpt from Leusden's Sefer Tehilim Liber Psalmorum using God's name Jehovah.

Johannes Leusden (also called Jan (informal), John (English), or Johann (German)) (26 April 1624 – 30 September 1699) was a Dutch Calvinist theologian and orientalist.

== Life ==
Leusden was born in Utrecht, Spanish Netherlands, Holy Roman Empire. He studied in Utrecht and Amsterdam and became a Professor of Hebrew in Utrecht, where he died, aged 75.

Leusden was one of the most prominent Bible experts of his time, and wrote several works about the Bible and about Hebrew philology (Philologus Hebraeus, 1656; Philologus Hebraeo-Mixtus, 1663; Philologus Hebraeo-Latino-Belgicum, 1668; Philologus Hebraeo-Graecus, 1670; Korte Hebreusche en Chaldeusche taalkonst, 1686). In 1661, together with the Amsterdam book printer Joseph Athias, he published his Biblia Hebraica, the first edition of the Hebrew Bible with numbered verses. The Catholic Encyclopedia of 1913 dismissed Leusden's copious notes to the text as being "of little value".

The 1667 edition was strongly criticized in 1669 by the Protestant Samuel Desmarets, who died in 1673. Athias answered the charges in a short work whose title begins, Caecus de coloribus. Athias’ pamphlet was a full-blown attack on a senior Christian theologian in the United Provinces of the Netherlands. That the true author of the pamphlet was not Athias but Johannes Leusden, and that the Utrecht professor had published it in Athias’ name, is an assessment that scholars have followed ever since.

In 1694, Leusden and German orientalist scholar Johann Andreas Eisenmenger edited the unvocalized Hebrew Bible Biblia Hebraica non punctata which was published in Frankfurt am Main, Holy Roman Empire.

His name and the "Philologus hebraeograecus" figure in a short story of Jorge Luis Borges, Argentinian writer (1899–1986) called "la muerte y la brújula" (The Death and the Compass).
