= Moshe Chashkes =

Jewish poet, satirist, dramatist, and translator

Moshe Leib Chashkes
- Born: September 27, 1848; Vilna or Bichov, Byelorussia, Russian Empire
- Died: December 15, 1906 (aged 58); St. Petersburg, Russia
- Writing career
- Pen name: Moshe Danzig
- Language: Hebrew, Yiddish, Russian

Moshe Leib ben Ya'akov Chashkes (Hebrew: משֶׁה לֵייבּ בֶּן יַעֲקֹב חַאשְׁקֶעס, Moshe Leib ben Ya‘aqov Ḥashkes; 27 September 1848 – 15 December 1906), also known by the pen names Moshe ben Ya'akov Danzig and Chashke di Vilnerke, was a poet, satirist, dramatist, and translator.

== Biography ==
Moshe Leib Chashkes was born in Vilna or Bichov in Byelorussia. He studied at the Volozhin Yeshiva and the beit midrash in Zhitomir (then led by Hayyim Selig Slonimski), where he became a follower of the Haskalah. Chashkes studied law in the United States and lived in Moscow, Riga, and Warsaw before settling in St. Petersburg, where he lived his last years there. He supported himself by selling his religious texts to Jewish travellers, and died in that city after a long illness.

== Work ==
Chashkes's first collection of Hebrew poetry, entitled Nite'e Na'amanim ('Seeds of the Faithful'), appeared in Warsaw in 1869. In the same year appeared Ha-Peraḥim ('The Flowers'; Odessa), followed by Nevel ve-Kinnor ('Harp and Lyre'; Odessa, 1871), Tzippor Deror ('Sparrow'; Odessa, 1872), Kol ha-Tor ('Voice of the Times'), Maḥat ba-Basar ha-Ḥai ('A Needle in Flesh'; St. Petersburg, 1877), all poetico-satirical productions. His Sefer ha-Yomi ('The Daily Book'), in which he attempts to describe in verse the life of a Jewish intellectual (St. Petersburg, 1881), is partly autobiographical. His final collection of poems, Dema'ot Atzurot ('Tears Restrained') appeared shortly after his death.

Chashkes also contributed poems and articles in Yiddish to Kol Mevasser, Kol la-Am, Yudishes Folks-blat, Hoyz-fraynd, and other publications. He published a collection of Yiddish poems entitled Lieder funem Herzen in 1888. (Krakow).

Among other works he translated the following into Russian: Kartina Muchenichestva Yevreyyev (St. Petersburg, 1879); M. J. Schleiden's Die Romantik des Märtyrerthums bei den Juden im Mittelalter; Stradanya, Byedstvo i Zaschitniki Yevreyyev (St. Petersburg, 1882); and the third edition of Ellenberg's Leiden der Juden. He was also the publisher and part translator of the fifth volume of Heinrich Graetz's History of the Jews, which appeared in Russian (Moscow, 1880), and later published a volume of Russian poetry, Stikhi i Mysli (St. Petersburg, 1888). In 1897 he published Abarnel, a drama in four acts, which would be translated in Hebrew by Y. L. Gamzu in 1894.
