= Aleksander Zederbaum =

Russian journalist (1816–1893)

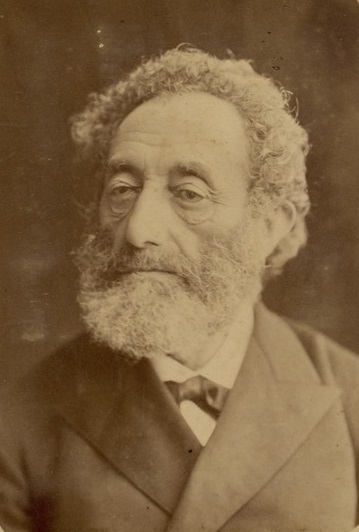
- Aleksander Zederbaum, 1885
- Born: August 27, 1816; Zamość, Congress Poland
- Died: September 8, 1893 (aged 77); Saint Petersburg, Russian Empire
- Writing career
- Language: Hebrew, Yiddish, Russian

Aleksander Ossypovich Zederbaum (Yiddish: אַלעקסאַנדער הלוי אָסיפאָוויטש צעדערבוים; August 27, 1816, Zamość – September 8, 1893, Saint Petersburg) was a Polish-Russian Jewish journalist who wrote primarily in Hebrew. He was founder and editor of Ha-Melitz, and other periodicals published in Yiddish and Russian.

== Biography ==
A son of poor parents, Zederbaum was apprenticed to a tailor. He succeeded in acquiring a knowledge of Hebrew literature, and of the Russian, Polish, and German languages. He married in Lublin, and in 1840 left for Odessa, then a centre of the Haskalah movement. He obtained there a commercial position, made the acquaintance of the Maskilim of the city, and in his leisure hours continued to work for his self-education. Later he opened a clothing-store, and was himself cutter in his tailoring-shop.

In 1860 Zederbaum succeeded in obtaining the government's permission to publish Ha-Melitz, the first Hebrew periodical issued in Russia; and three years later he began publishing the pioneer Yiddish journal Kol Mevasser. After an existence of eight years the latter paper was suppressed by the government, whereupon Zederbaum went to Saint Petersburg, obtaining permission to transfer the headquarters of Ha-Melitz to that city. He was also granted permission to do his own printing, and to publish, besides Ha-Melitz, a Russian weekly (Vyestnik Ruskich Yedreed), which, however, enjoyed only a short existence, as did also the "Razsvyet," which he started a few years later. In 1881 he founded the Volksblatt, a daily Yiddish journal which existed for eight years, although Zederbaum was its editor for only a few years. In 1884 Zederbaum invited rising Yiddish author Mordecai Spector to join him as an assistant editor of the paper, after publishing his breakthrough novel Der Yidisher Muzhik (The Jewish Farmer). The two worked together until 1887.

Zederbaum was the author of "Keter Kehunnah" and "Ben ha-Metsarim," but neither of these works met with any success. His chief significance lies in the fact that he was a champion of the Haskalah. His Kol Mevasser offered an opportunity for many of the best jargon-writers to develop their talents; and among these may be mentioned Yitzkhok Yoel Linetzky, Mendele Mocher Sforim, Mordecai Spector, and Sholem Aleichem.

Zederbaum exercised considerable influence in government circles, and it was due to his intercession that an impartial judgment was obtained for many Jewish families accused of blood libel in Kutaisi; he disclosed also the ignorance of the Russian anti-Semite Hippolytus Lutostansky, whose pamphlets threatened to become dangerous for the Russian Jews. The Palestine Association of Odessa owed its existence to Zederbaum's activity.
