= Die Kuranten =

Yiddish-language newspaper (1686–1687)

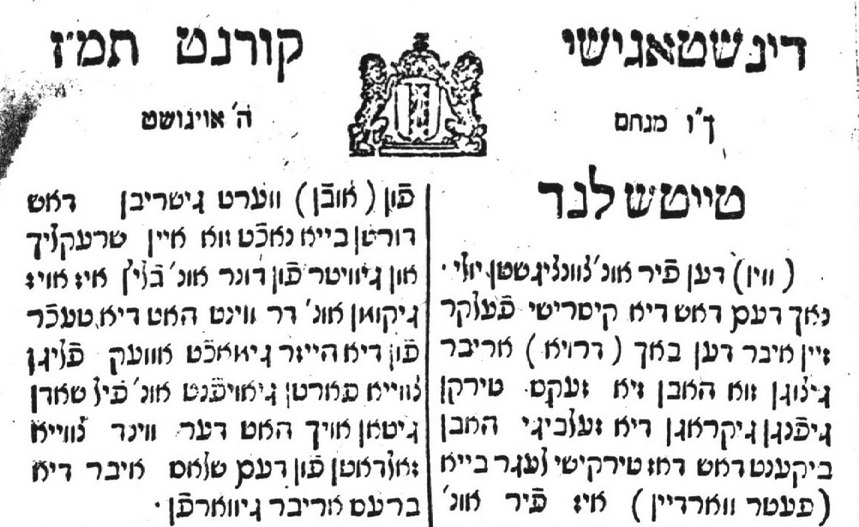
Title page from 5 August 1687

The Dinstagishe un Fraytagishe Kuranten was the earliest known Yiddish-language periodical, founded by Uri Phoebus Halevi (also known as Uri Fayvesh ben Aharon ha-Levi). It was a semi-weekly founded in Amsterdam in 1686, that was published on Tuesdays (Dinstag) and Fridays (Fraytag) and it lasted for little over one year. It covered local news and news from other Jewish communities, including those as far away as India. Issues of the paper were discovered in 1902 by the librarian David Montezinos.

Die Kuranten is considered by some as the oldest Jewish newspaper, although others consider the Spanish-language Gazeta de Amsterdam from 1672 as the oldest Jewish newspaper. Die Kuranten was the first publication not only published by the Jews, but addressed to and for the Jewish community, unlike the Spanish-language Gazeta de Amsterdam, which was not explicitly Jewish but had a predominantly Jewish readership, first published in 1672. The Yiddish used in Die Kuranten was notable for its lack of Hebrew-Aramaic elements and focused on news both specifically Jewish, such as the murder of a Jew in Hamburg and the fate of the Jewish community in Budapest during the war with the Ottoman Empire.

== Background ==
Uri Faybesh Halevi (1626–1715) was the grandson of the rabbi Moses Uri Halevi, who had emigrated to Amsterdam from Emden, Germany. Uri Halevi and his son, Aron, were the first Jewish teachers of the New Christians from Spain and Portugal. Uri Faybesh Halevi initially joined the High German (Ashkenazi) congregation, then switched to a small Polish congregation in 1666, returned to the German congregation in December 1669, and finally became a member of the Sephardic congregation in 1671. This was verboten of Ashkenazi Jews but because of the standing of his grandfather and father, he was permitted to join. Halevi had founded a printing house in 1658 with the capital left by his wife's grandfather and eventually became one of the leading Jewish publishers in Amsterdam. He was admitted to the Amsterdam Guild of Booksellers, Bookprinters, and Bookbinders as a member in 1664 under the name Philips (or Phylips) Levi.

Halevi was at the intersection of Ashkenazi, Sephardic, and Christian printing through his own background, his membership at the Sephardic synagogue, and his non-Jewish in-laws, as his wife's father, David Pastes, had converted to Judaism.

=== Amsterdam Jewish community ===
The Amsterdam Jewish community at the time of Die Kuranten's publication was divided between the more settled, wealthier Sephardic Jews who had fled from Spain to Portugal to Amsterdam. Newer arrivals were Yiddish-speaking Ashkenazi Jews from Germany who had arrived following the breakout of the Thirty Years' War, followed by further Yiddish-speaking Jews who had fled pogroms in Ukraine and Poland (1648–1650), and Polish and Lithuanian Jews fleeing wars between Poland, Russia, and Sweden. This group, on the whole, tended to be poorer and have more limited employment opportunities; the wealthier Sephardim repeatedly tried to encourage the Ashkenazi arrivals to re-emigrate to their home countries, without success. It is estimated that the number of Ashkenazi Jews in Amsterdam during this time period, who would have likely composed the majority of the Die Kuranten readership, was between three and four thousand. The number of translations from Dutch to Yiddish, in the views of historian Marion Aptroot, suggests that many Ashkenazi Jews were only able to read and speak Yiddish.

It is also possible that the paper had a readership outside of what was then the Dutch Republic. Shlomo Berger was stated that the paper was circulating in Central and Eastern Europe during its brief publication.

== History ==
The first issue was published on 9 August 1686. It was printed by Halevi from the first issue until 3 June 1687, when publishing was taken over by David de Castro Tartas, a Sephardic Jew and one of Halevi's competitors. Single issues published by Halevi were called Kuranten (a plural noun), whereas a single issue published by Tartas was called Kurant. The issues usually appeared twice a week, but from certain periods, e.g. 6 December 1686 to 14 February 1687, it was published only weekly, on Fridays. From 8 August 1687 until the final issue, it was published weekly "because the Tuesday issue sells poorly".

The news published in the periodical, which came from around the world through other Dutch newspapers, was edited and translated by the Jewish convert Moshe bar Avraham Avinu. Originally from Nikolsburg, bar Avraham Avinu's first language was most likely German, which made learning Dutch relatively easier. As a ger, who likely converted to marry his wife, bar Avraham Avinu would have had to learn Hebrew and likely Yiddish. As a compositor and translator, his and other compositors' role in the Jewish and publishing worlds would have been extremely important. He continued to work on Die Kuranten after the transfer from Halevi to Tartas in 1687.

The final known issue of the paper was published on 5 December 1687. Although nothing about the issue indicates it was the final publication of Die Kuranten, bar Avraham Avinu began working for the most influential Ashkenazi family in Amsterdam, the Gomperts, under the printer and businessman Cosman Gomperts in 1688. It is unlikely the publication of Die Kuranten continued beyond this point. By 1694, bar Avraham Avinu had left Amsterdam and set up a print house in Halle.

== Discovery ==
After the periodical folded, its existence and history was largely unknown in the Netherlands until 1902, when David Montezinos (1828–1916), the librarian at the Portuguese Synagogue, bought a book from a street peddler. The book contained 100 issues of Die Kuranten. Other Yiddishists, such as Sigmund Seeligmann, Jacob Shatzky, and Max Weinreich, also wrote about and described Die Kuranten; Weinrich described the paper as the "grandmother of Yiddish press" (di bobe fun der yidisher prese) in 1920.

In 1935, Montezinos' assistant and successor at the Portuguese Synagogue library, Jacob da Silva Rosa published an article about Die Kuranten in Nieuw Israëlietisch Weekblad delineating the differences between Die Kuranten and the Gazeta. Where the Gazeta was targeted at the Spanish-speaking Jewish community that had settled in Amsterdam as New Christians, Die Kuranten was for a Jewish readership that was largely unable to read Dutch newspapers. In da Silva Rosa's opinion, which was challenged by Shatzky in a later editorial, the Gazeta was the basis for Die Kuranten. Shatzky instead postulated that the model for Die Kuranten was Haarlemse Courant, a gentile paper published concurrently.

=== Disappearance ===
During World War II, the library of the synagogue, including the book containing the issues of Die Kuranten was transported to Germany. They were returned to the synagogue in 1946. In 1969, it was displayed as part of an exhibit on the history of the Yiddish-language press in Germany and the Netherlands at the Anne Frank House. Following its one and only public display at the Anne Frank House, the volume went missing in the 1970s and has never been found. It is possible that the book was stolen from the library directly, or that it was lost when the contents of the library were shipped from Amsterdam to the Jewish National and University Library in Jerusalem in 1978. Photographs and photocopies of the paper exist and are preserved at the Bibliotheca Rosenthaliana in the University of Amsterdam, and microfilms are kept in the Amsterdam city archives, along with several other libraries in the Netherlands and internationally.

== Content ==
=== Format ===
The pages of the paper, per the book found by Montezinos, were 170 millimetres (6.7 in) by 98 millimetres (3.9 in); each page was divided into two columns, separated by a line, and each column contained 38 lines. According to Seeligmann, the Kuranten was printed on double octavo sheets. The type was set in the cursive, run-on font that was used most commonly for publications in Yiddish between the 16th and 19th centuries.

When Tartas took over the paper, he included the Amsterdam coat of arms between the words Dinstagishe/Fraytagishe and Kuranten. The Jewish year also became included as part of the header of each issue.

=== Die Kuranten as a Jewish newspaper ===
While the Spanish Gazeta de Amsterdam (1672) or the Italian Gazzetta d'Amsterdam (1673) or are considered by some as the first Jewish newspaper, it has been argued that these were only printed by a Jew; Die Kuranten would be considered the first paper published for Jews. Both the Gazeta and the Gazzetta were published by de Castro Tartas. An analysis of the archived Gazeta editions from 1675 showed that the content and form of the Gazeta was comparable to that of the Amsterdamsche Courant and the French-language La Gazette d'Amsterdam; it mainly contained international news, particularly about wars, followed by economic reports, sparse news from Spain, and an absence of news about Jews.

Mau Kopuit, the chief editor of the Nieuw Israëlietisch Weekblad, described Die Kuranten as the "Grandmother of the Jewish press" (Dutch: Grootmoeder van de joodse pers) and the Spanish and Italian publications as her "stepsisters" that were, halachically, not Jewish publications as they were not interested for the Jewish community but rather for merchants interested in trade reports.

== Legacy ==
After Die Kuranten folded, a Yiddish-language periodical was not published until January 1781 with the printing of Vokhentlikhe Berikhtn.

== Sources ==
- Fuks, Lajb; Fuks-Mansfeld, R. G. (1987). Hebrew Typography in the Northern Netherlands, 1585–1815: Historical Evaluation and Descriptive Bibliography. Brill. ISBN 9789004081543. OCLC 1017214621.
- Liptzin, Sol, A History of Yiddish Literature, Jonathan David Publishers, Middle Village, NY, 1972, ISBN 0-8246-0124-6.
