= Uguy =

Village in Novosibirsk Oblast, Russia

Uguy Угуй
- Village
- Location within Novosibirsk Oblast Location within Russia
- Coordinates: 56°01′45″N 76°03′15″E
- Country: Russia
- Region: Novosibirsk Oblast
- District: Ust-Tarksky District
- Village Council: Uguysky Village Council
- Time zone: UTC+7:00
- Postcode: 632184

Uguy (Russian: Угуй) is a rural locality (a village or selo). It is administrative center of the Uguysky Village Council of Ust-Tarksky District, Novosibirsk Oblast, Russia. Population: 319 (2010 census); 317 (2002 census);

== Geography ==
Uguy is located 63 kilometers (39 mi) to the NNE of Ust-Tarka, the district capital. It lies by the northwestern shore of the lake of the same name.
