= Ust-Tarksky District =

Ust-Tarksky District Усть-Таркский район
- District
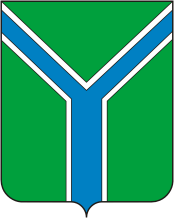
- Flag Coat of arms
- Location of Ust-Tarksky District (red border), in Novosibirsk Oblast
- Coordinates: 55°34′N 75°42′E
- Country: Russia
- Federal subject: Novosibirsk Oblast
- Established: 20 January 1936
- Administrative center: Ust-Tarka

Area
  - Total: 4,061 km^{2} (1,568 sq mi)

Population (2010 Census)
  - Total: 12,307
  - Density: 3.031/km^{2} (7.849/sq mi)
  - Urban: 0%
  - Rural: 100%

Administrative structure
  - Inhabited localities: 37 rural localities

Municipal structure
  - Municipally incorporated as: Ust-Tarksky Municipal District
  - Municipal divisions: 0 urban settlements, 13 rural settlements
- Time zone: UTC+7 (MSK+4)
- OKTMO ID: 50655000
- Website: http://www.ust-tarka.nso.ru/

Ust-Tarksky District (Russian: Усть-Та́ркский райо́н) is an administrative and municipal district (raion), one of the thirty in Novosibirsk Oblast, Russia. It is located in the west of the oblast. The area of the district is 4,061 square kilometers (1,568 sq mi). Its administrative center is the rural locality (a selo) of Ust-Tarka. Population: 12,307 (2010 Census); 14,670 (2002 Census); 15,405 (1989 Soviet census). The population of Ust-Tarka accounts for 31.0% of the district's total population.

== Geography ==
Ust-Tarksky District is located in the Baraba Lowland. Most of the area is swampy. The largest river in the district is the Om, and Lake Uguy, by Uguy village, is the largest lake.

== Notable residents ==
- Viktor Markin (born 1957 in the village of Oktyabrsky), Soviet Olympic athlete
