= Solomon de Oliveyra =

Dutch rabbi, poet, and philologist

- Born: c. 1633; Lisbon, Kingdom of Portugal or Amsterdam, Dutch Republic
- Died: 23 May 1708; Amsterdam, Dutch Republic
- Spouse: Rachel Dias (m. 1660)
- Writing career
- Language: Hebrew, Portuguese, Spanish

Solomon de Oliveyra (Hebrew: שלמה דֵי אוליוֵירה, romanized: Shelomoh dey Oliveyra, Portuguese: Selomoh de Oliveyra; c. 1633 – 23 May 1708) was a Dutch rabbi, poet, and philologist. He has been described as the "preeminent and omnipresent Hebrew poet of Jewish Amsterdam" in the late seventeenth century.

== Biography ==
Oliveyra was born in Lisbon or Amsterdam, the son of fugitive Marrano and Jewish scholar David Israel de Oliveyra.

He was preacher at several philanthropic institutions, and successor of Moses Raphael de Aguilar as teacher at the Keter Torah in Amsterdam. He was also a member of the rabbinical college of the Spanish-Portuguese community of the same city, becoming its president after Jacob Sasportas' death in 1698. He was for a time an adherent of the Sabbatian messianic movement.

As early as 1652 Oliveyra published a Portuguese translation of the Canon of Avicenna, which was used by Sousa in his Vestigios de Lingua Arabica em Portugal (Lisbon, 1798, 1830). Even as a youth, however, he devoted himself mostly to Hebrew poetry, writing occasional and liturgical poems, generally in imitation of older piyyutim. These poems are found in the author's Hebrew rhyming dictionary Sharshot gavlut (Amsterdam, 1665), which was published together with his Ayyelet ahavim, a Hebrew textbook on rhetoric with exercises (Amsterdam 1665; Vienna, 1818). In addition, some two dozen Hebrew poems on tombstones at the Beth Haim Cemetery at Ouderkerk aan de Amstel are ascribed to Oliveyra.

He died on 23 May 1708, leaving in manuscript a collection entitled Peraḥ shoshan, containing various treatises on the fine arts, grammar and logic, the virtues, the festivals, the calendar, and other topics.

== Publications ==
- Sharshot gavlut. Amsterdam. 1665. Rhyming dictionary with chapters on metre.
- Ayyelet ahavim [A Loving Doe]. Amsterdam: D. de Castro Tartas. 1665. Poetic retelling of the Binding of Isaac.
- Sefer etz ḥayyim. Amsterdam: D. de Castro Tartas. 1682. hdl:2027/nc01.ark:/13960/t1wd71t9f. A Hebrew-Aramaic-Portuguese lexicon.
- Zayit ra'anan. Amsterdam. 1683. A collection of Talmudic and scientific Hebrew terms with some Hebrew riddles.
- Ilan she-anafav merubbin. Amsterdam. 1683. A Portuguese-Hebrew vocabulary, with additions to Etz ḥayyim.
- Oliveyra, Salomo de (1688). Livro da gramatica Hebrayca y Chaldayca (in Portuguese and Hebrew). Amsterdam. A Hebrew manual and a short Aramaic grammar.
- Darkhe no'am. Amsterdam: David Tartas. 1688. A dictionary of rabbinical terms, published with Darkhe ha-Shem (1689).
- Ta'ame ha-te'amim. Amsterdam. 1655. On accents, published together with the text of the Pentateuch (the portion on the Psalms was republished with the text of the Psalter in 1670).
- Calendario Fazil y Curioso de las Tablas Lunares. Amsterdam. (Published with the text of the Pentateuch in 1666 and 1726; with Circulo de los Tequphot in 1687.)
- Enseña á Pecadores Que Contiene Diferentes Obras Mediante las Quales Pide al Hombre Piedad á Su Criador. Amsterdam. 1666. A Portuguese translation of part of Isaiah Hurwitz's ascetic work.
