= Der Beobachter an der Weichsel =

Der Beobachter an der Weichsel — Dostrzegacz Nadwiślański (The Vistula Observer, in German and Polish) was the first Jewish newspaper. It was a weekly printed in Congress Poland, then part of the Russian Empire, between December 3, 1823 and November 29, 1824, 44 issues in total, with a circulation of 150 copies.

Launched by Polish Jewish writer, head of the Warsaw rabbinical seminary, and assimilation activist Antoni Eisenbaum, the paper was printed in two languages: Polish and German, the latter in Hebrew script. To this end, during the centenary celebration of the Yiddish press, Nahum Sokolow smugly noted that as early as 1686 a group of Polish Jews in Amsterdam printed a semi-weekly in a likewise way, i.e., in German in Hebrew script, "so that the centenary of the Yiddish press should have been celebrated more than a century ago". Other researchers claim that the language was heavily Germanized Yiddish to the point of being described as German. A.Haffka wrote that the newspaper was not very well accepted, because it was written not in Yiddish, but rather in German. Others disliked the assimilationist character of the newspaper.

The page layout of the divided into two columns by language with basically identical content. The paper was run single-handedly by Eisenbaum himself.

The next Jewish newspaper in Russian Empire, Ha-Melitz, this time in Hebrew, appeared nearly 40 years later.
