= Isabella Grinevskaya =

Russian-Jewish novelist, poet and dramatist

Beyle Friedberg
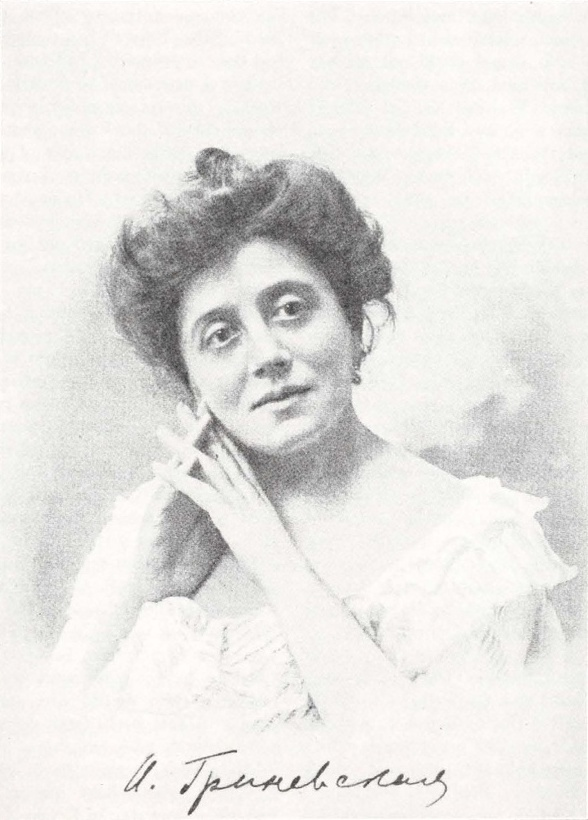
- Born: 3 May 1864; Grodno, Russian Empire
- Died: 15 October 1944 (aged 80); Leningrad, Soviet Union
- Relatives: Abraham Shalom Friedberg (father)
- Writing career
- Pen name: Isabella, Isabella Arkadevna Grinevskaya, I. Grin
- Language: Yiddish, Russian
- Genres: Fiction, theatre
- Notable work: Bab (1903)

Beyle (Berta) Friedberg (Yiddish: בּיילע פֿרידבּערג; 3 May 1864 – 15 October 1944), (Note: Some sources list Grinevskaya's place of death as Constantinople.) best known by the pen names Isabella (Yiddish: איזאַבּעלאַ) and Isabella Arkadevna Grinevskaya (Russian: Изабелла Аркадьевна Гриневская), was a Russian-Jewish novelist, poet, and dramatist. As a translator, she translated into Russian works from Polish, German, French, Italian, Armenian, and Georgian.

== Biography ==
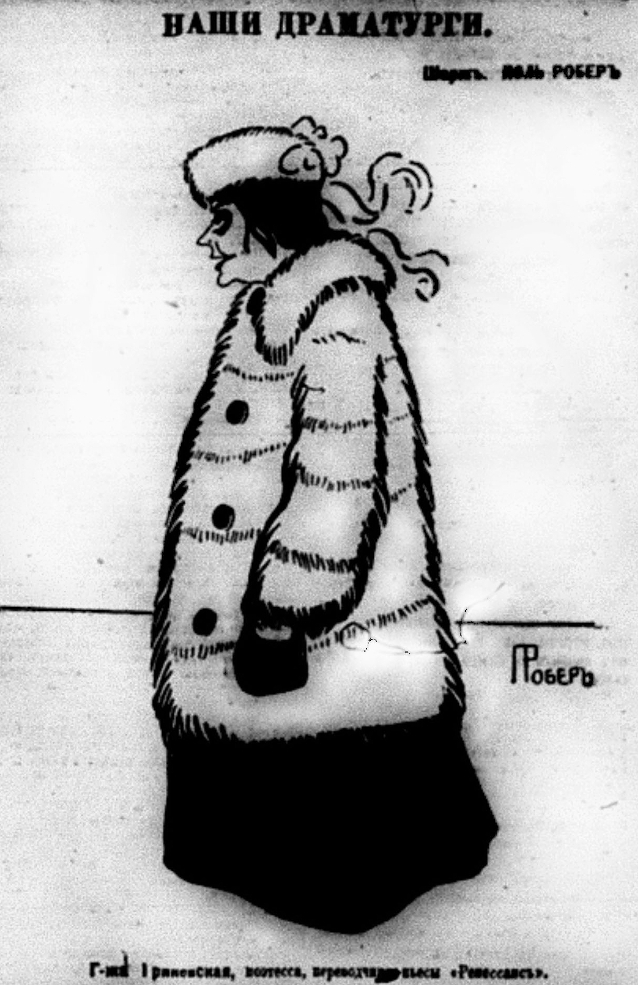
Likeness of Grinevskaya by Swiss caricaturist Paul Robert

=== Early life and career ===
Beyle Friedberg was born in Grodno to Russian Hebrew writer Abraham Shalom Friedberg, later moving to Saint Petersburg. There she frequented Yiddish literary circles and, in 1886, married fellow writer Mordecai Spector. They moved to Warsaw the following year, where they would eventually divorce.

Her first published story, a novella entitled Der yosem (lit. 'The Orphan'), appeared under the pseudonym "Isabella" in the first volume of Der hoyz-fraynd in 1888. She continued to write short stories for Der hoyz-fraynd and the Yidishe bibliotek through the 1890s, depicting the social conditions of the Eastern European Jewish middle class, particularly the experiences of young educated women from the Jewish community. In these stories, she dwells on comparisons between the older and the newer generation, and points out the dangers of a superficial modern education. Her novella Fun glik tsum keyver: a khosn oyf oystsoln (lit. 'From Joy to the Grave: A Husband on the Installment Plan') was published in Warsaw in 1894.

Grinevskaya's career as a dramatist began with Ogon'ki (lit. 'The First Storm'), a Russian one-act play which debuted on 2 April 1895 at the Alexandrinsky Theatre in St. Petersburg, starring Maria Savina. This was followed by a series of one-act lyrical comedies (Work Day, A Dance Lesson, Play for Departing, The Letter, They've Agreed, The Conflagration, Bear Hunting, and Letter from the Village), which were performed on the stages of the Imperial Theatres. She also produced, among others, translations of Lucjan Rydel's Zaczarowane koło, Gerolamo Rovetta's La Realtà, and Gabriele D'Annunzio's La città morta, the latter of which was staged at the Alexandrinsky.

As a translator, she translated into Russian works from Polish, German, French, Italian, Armenian, and Georgian.

=== 1900s–1910s ===
In May 1903 she published Bab, a five-act poetic drama based on the life of the founder of Bábism. It was performed on stage the following January at the St. Petersburg Literary-Artistic Society Theatre (now home to the Bolshoi Drama Theatre), directed by Evtikhii Karpov and produced by Aleksey Suvorin. The play was praised for its literary quality, most notably by Leo Tolstoy. A ban on its production in the city was nonetheless imposed by government censors after five performances. Still, the drama had successful runs in Astrakhan and Poltoratsk, and would return to the Petrograd stage post-February Revolution in April 1917. It would later be translated into German, French, and Tatar.

Grinevskaya emigrated to Constantinople in around 1910. In early 1911, she spent two weeks in Egypt as the guest of ʻAbdu'l-Bahá, an account of which she published as "A Journey to the Countries of the Sun" in 1914. Her drama Bekha-Ulla, a sequel to Bab on the life of Baháʼu'lláh, was published in 1912 but never performed. She returned to the Russian Empire at the outbreak of World War I, settling in Kharkov.

Other writings of this era include the play Surovye dni (1909; lit. 'Harsh Days'), set during the Cossack Rebellion of 1773–75, the collections Salute to Heroes (1915) and From the Book of Life (1915), and the pamphlet The Right of Books, in which she protested against censorship.

=== Later life ===
Grinevskaya's only publication post-Revolution was the poetry collection Pavlovsk (1922; lit. 'Poems'). Her later years were spent largely in isolation. She died in 1944.
