= Isaac de Castro Tartas =

Marrano and Jewish martyr

Isaac de Castro Tartas (ca. 1623, Tartas, Gascony – December 15, 1647, Lisbon) was a Marrano and Jewish martyr.

== Biography ==
Castro Tartas was born in France, where his parents had found refuge under cover as Catholics, before moving to Amsterdam in 1640. Isaac remained with his family in Amsterdam for only one year, where he continued his studies in philosophy and Hebrew before emigrating to Brazil with his aunt and her husband Moses Raphael de Aguilar. His parents and two younger brothers remained; one of them, David de Castro Tartas, later became notable as a printer in Amsterdam. The family was also related to the physician Elijah Montalto.

In 1641, he arrived in Paraíba, Brazil, where he lived for several years. Against the wishes of his relatives there, he went later to Bahia de Todos os Santos, the colony's capital, where he was recognized as a Jew, arrested by the Portuguese Inquisition, and sent to Lisbon.

Although a Dutch citizen, he was summoned before the tribunal of the Inquisition, where he avowed his belief in Judaism and his determination to remain true to the faith. All the endeavors of the inquisitors to convert him to Roman Catholicism were in vain.

On December 15, 1647 (not September 23, as was erroneously supposed), Tartas and five fellow sufferers were led to the stake. Amid the flames, he called out startlingly, "Shema' Yisrael! [Hear, O Israel!] The Lord our God is One!"—with the word "echad" (”one”), he died. For several years, the public of Lisbon repeated his last words so that the Inquisition was finally compelled to prohibit this confession of the Jewish faith under the threat of severe punishment.

In Amsterdam, the tragic end of the promising young man occasioned deep mourning. A memorial sermon was delivered by Saul Levi Morteira (printed at the press of Isaac's younger brother), and elegies in Hebrew and Spanish were written in his honor by Solomon de Oliveyra and Jonah Abravanel.

== Bibliography ==
- Cardoso, Isaac, Las Excelencias de los Hebreos, pp. 324 et seq.
- Kayserling, Meyer, Geschichte der Juden in Portugal, pp. 308 et seq. (available here)
- —, Sephardim, pp. 204 et seq.
- Publications of the American Jewish Historical Society, iv 130 et seq.
