= Yitzkhok Yoel Linetzky =

Yiddish language author (1839–1915)

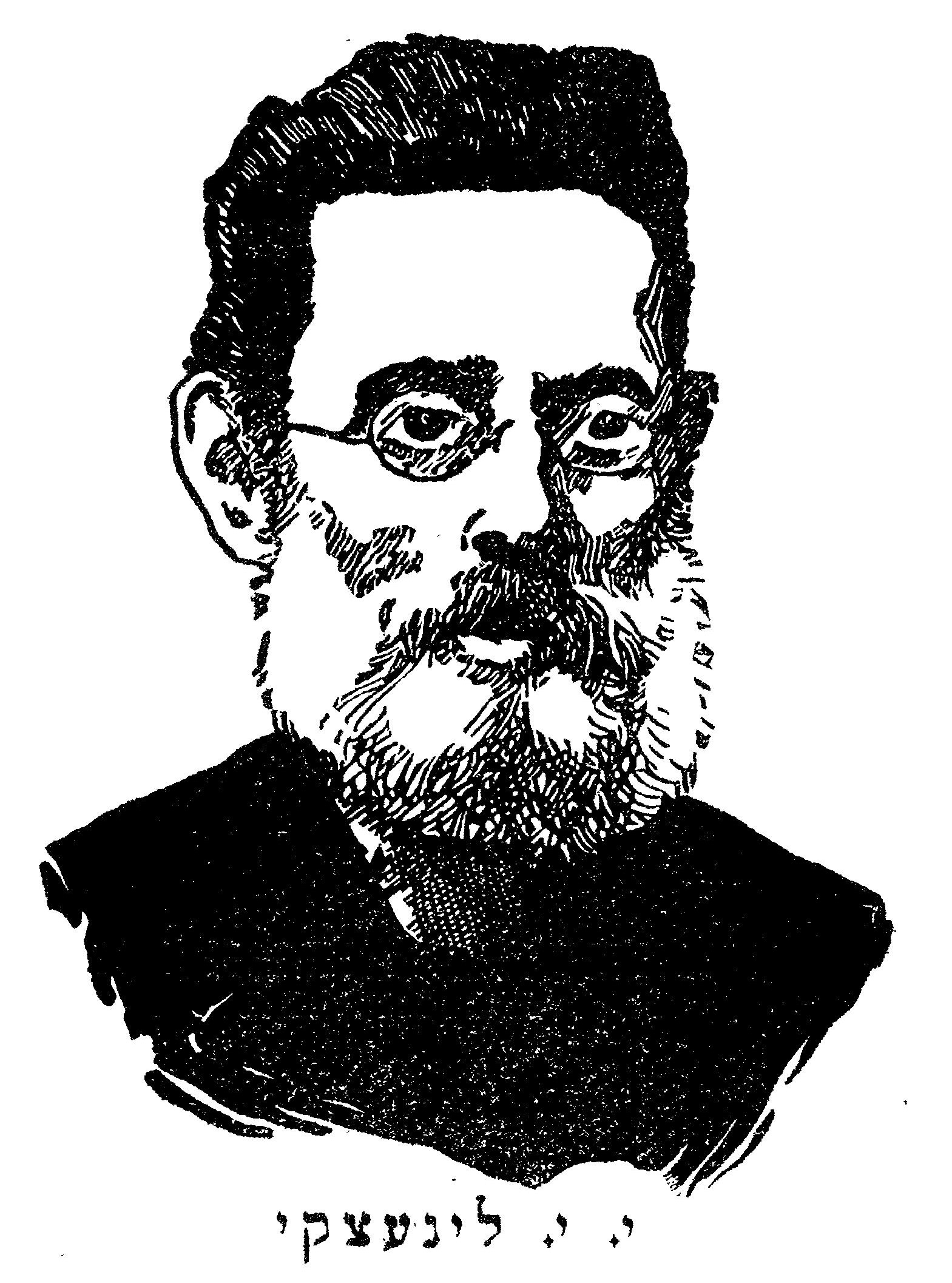
I.J. Linetzky from Dos Poylishe yungel (1921)

Yitzkhok Yoel Linetzky (Yiddish: יצחק יואל לינעצקי, 1839–1915) was a Yiddish language author and early Zionist. Sol Liptzin characterized him as "a master of the picturesque vitriolic phrase." [Liptzin, 1972, 46]

== Life ==
He was raised a Hasidic Jew in Vinnytsia, Podolia (now in Ukraine), but revolted against his violent schoolteachers and cabalist father by aligning himself with the Haskalah, the Jewish Enlightenment. His father tried to offset this development by marrying him at the age of fourteen to a twelve-year-old girl; he drew her away from Hasidism and Kabbalah, and his father forced him to divorce and remarry, this time to what Liptzin describes as "a deaf, moronic woman".

Linetzky ran away to Odessa, Ukraine, where he acquired a secular education. Attempting to leave for Germany to continue his education, he was stopped at the border and brought back, a virtual prisoner, to Vinitza. At 23, he managed again to escape, this time to the government-sponsored rabbinical academy at Zhytomyr, where he developed a close friendship with Abraham Goldfaden.

Like Abraham Goldfaden and several other Yiddish-language writers of his generation, he came to prominence in the 1860s as a writer for Kol Mevasser; like several others, he had first published in its Hebrew language sister publication Hamelitz. With Goldfaden, he was later involved in several Yiddish language newspapers, including as joint editors of the short-lived weekly Yisrolik (July 1875–February 1876) almost immediately before Goldfaden founded the first professional Yiddish theater troupe.

The pogroms following the 1881 assassination of Czar Alexander II of Russia made Linetzky into an early Zionist. His 1882 booklet America or Israel aligned him with the Hovevei Zion movement, active in the Jewish colonization of Palestine.

== Works ==
His semi-autobiographical picaresque novel, Dos Poylishe Yingl (The Polish Lad), an outright attack on the Hasidim, first appeared in installments in Kol Mevasser in 1867, and remained popular at least until the eve of World War II.

Other works included a book of poems Der Beyzer Marshalik (The Angry Master of Ceremonies, 1879).
