= Joseph de la Vega =

Jewish Hispano-Dutch merchant, poet, and philanthropist

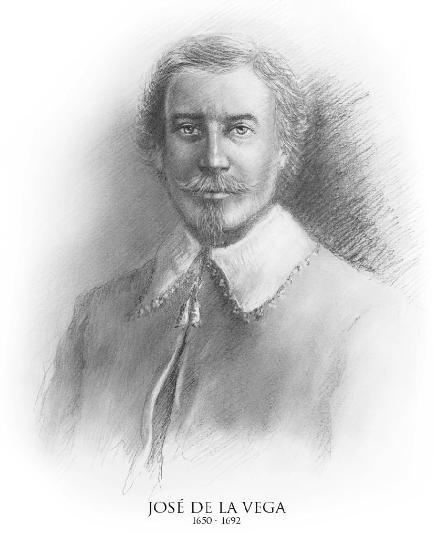
Idealized portrait, artist unknown

José or Joseph Penso de la Vega, best known as Joseph de la Vega (ca. 1650 — Amsterdam, 13 November, 1692), was a Sephardic Jewish merchant and author. He resided in various locations of western Europe across his life, and was involved in the diamond trade, finance industry, and wrote moral philosophy and poetry.

He became famous for his masterpiece Confusion of Confusions, originally written in Spanish. Vega's work is the first study written about the Amsterdam Stock Exchange and its participants, the shareholders. He describes the gamut of investing and financial speculation he observed, including options (puts and calls), futures contracts, margin buying, to bull and bear conspiracies, even some form of stock-index trading. The publication of Confusión de Confusiones was an early examination of what was later called technical analysis and behavioral finance.

== Biography ==
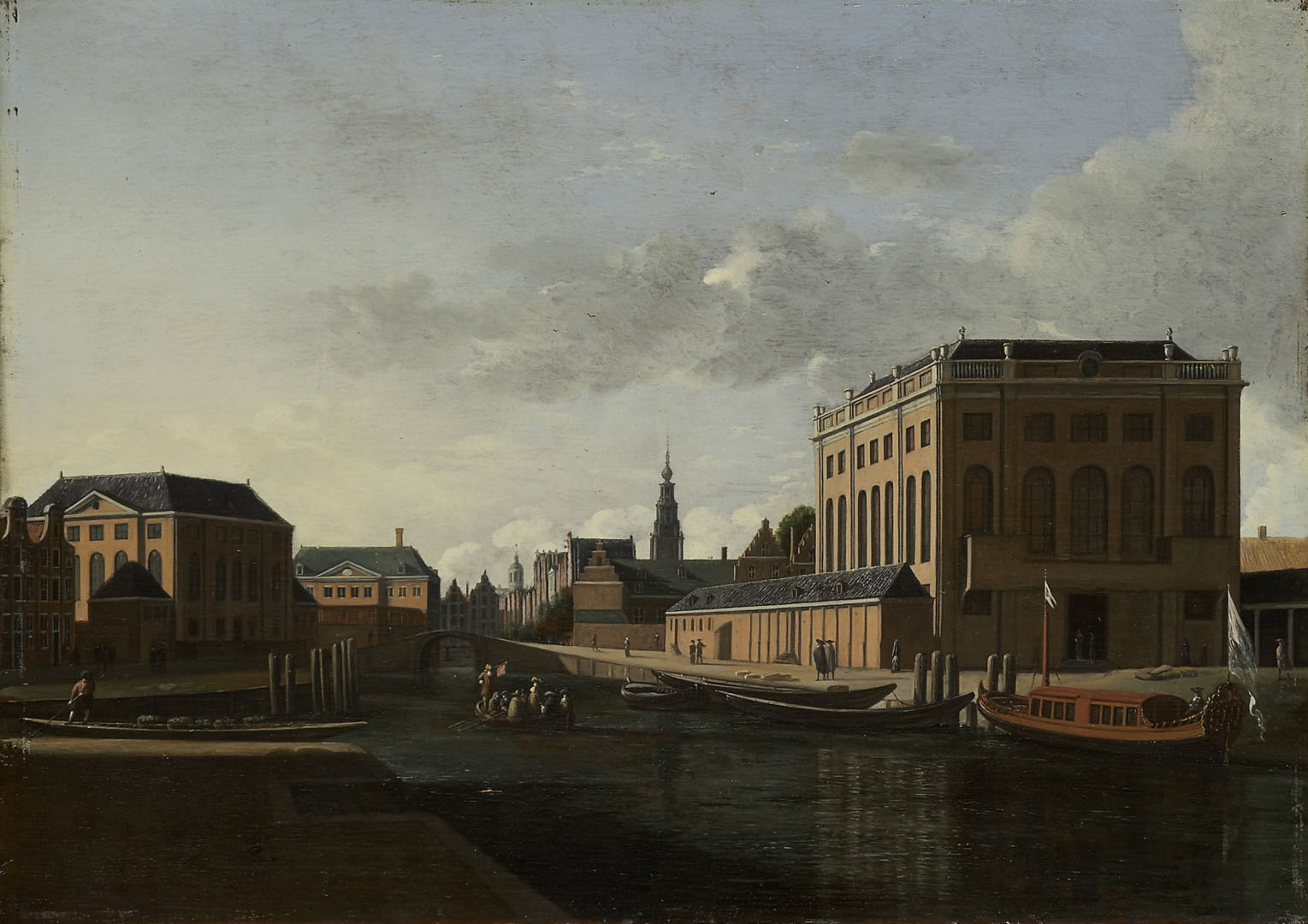
View of the two synagogues of Amsterdam from the East by Gerrit Berckheyde.

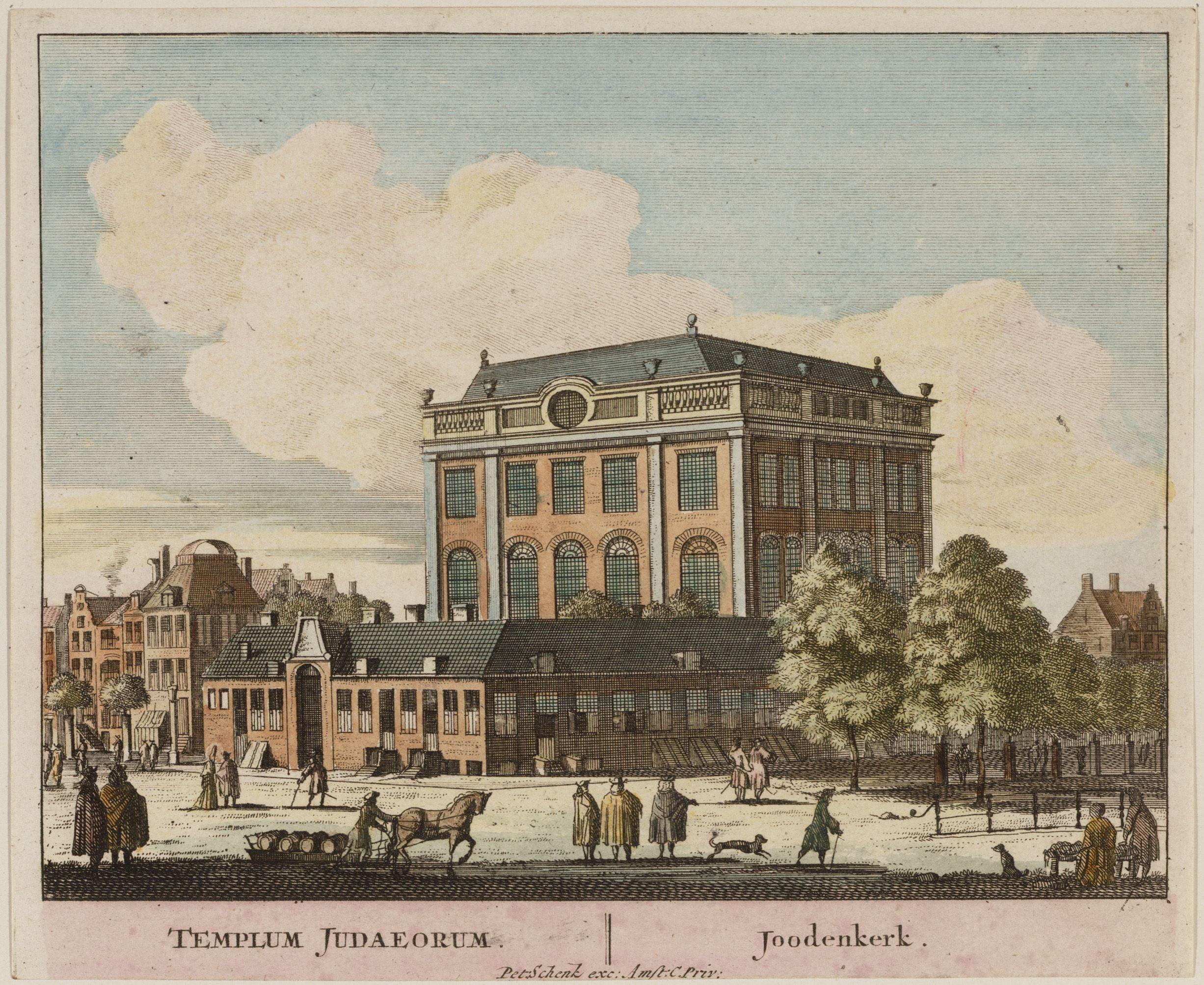
Portuguese Synagogue (Amsterdam) by Peter Schenk the Elder It is the area where De la Vega grew up.

Joseph Penso Felix was born about 1650 into a family of Spanish and Portuguese Jews. His birthplace is unknown, but scholars believe either Córdoba, Spain or Amsterdam, Netherlands are most probable. He was the son of Isaac Penso Félix (1608-1683) a merchant, and of Esther de la Vega (-1679). His father was a converso from Espejo, a small town in Córdoba province (Andalusia), who had made a solemn vow in the dungeon of the Inquisition that within a year after regaining his liberty he would openly profess Judaism. His father fulfilled his oath in Middelburg after his escape to Antwerp. He moved to Hamburg, where he married Esther de la Vega; Sara, their first child, was born there in 1645. In 1655 he was appointed parnas, not long after the family settled in Amsterdam. According to the marriage certificates in the Amsterdam City Archives, Joseph had three younger brothers and four younger sisters: Abraham Penso Felix (ca 1656-1710) was a schoolmaster, a diamond seller and traded in slaves; David (1654-) and Raphael Penso (ca 1659-) were merchants, who moved to London; Jochebet Pensa (1655-1718), Ribca Penso (1662-1720), Abigail Penso (ca 1663-1708) and Lea Pensa (1664-1710) lived in Amsterdam.

Joseph was taught by Isaac Aboab da Fonseca and Moses Raphael de Aguilar, members of the Talmud Torah community. He completed his first Hebrew drama, "Asire ha-Tiḳwah" ("The prisoner of hope"), in three acts, which appeared in Amsterdam in 1673 at Joseph Athias and in which he allegorically depicted the victory of the will over the passions. He unusually signed this Hebrew drama as José Penso, not Josseph de la Vega which was his standard signature for his works written in 16th century literary style Spanish. According to José Amador de los Ríos he had a unique poetic style with great originality, although he was clearly influenced by famous Spanish "16th century Golden Era" writers like Lope de Vega and Pedro Calderón de la Barca. He married Raquel Alvares Vega from Antwerp, unknown is when. His commercial life began in Amsterdam in 1679 with a bill protest on Portugal; it is the only record on his name. Joseph or José resided in Livorno, Italy, at the age of 26, in 1676. He participated in the Academy of the Sitibundi in Amsterdam (where he was secretary of the Academy of the Flori, founded by Manuel de Belmonte in 1685) and in Hamburg. Manuel de Belmonte (-1705), was a court Jew from 1674 resident of the Spanish king, who organized slave trades between 1679 and 1691. He printed most of his books in Amsterdam, at the clandestine printing press of David de Castro Tartaz, to circumvent the censorship imposed by the Sephardic rabbis.

In August 1688 Joseph de la Vega lived through the collapse of the Dutch East India Company and Dutch West India Company, which financially ruined him. The funding of the armed invasion of William III in England caused a financial crisis in the Dutch Republic. Consequently, the financiers following William III to Britain possessed a full range of financial techniques, and for which they found a ready market indeed. This transfer of know-how formed the basis of derivatives trading in London, firmly linking Amsterdam's pioneering work to the emergence of modern markets. He was buried at Beth Haim of Ouderkerk aan de Amstel.

== Confusion of Confusions (1688) ==
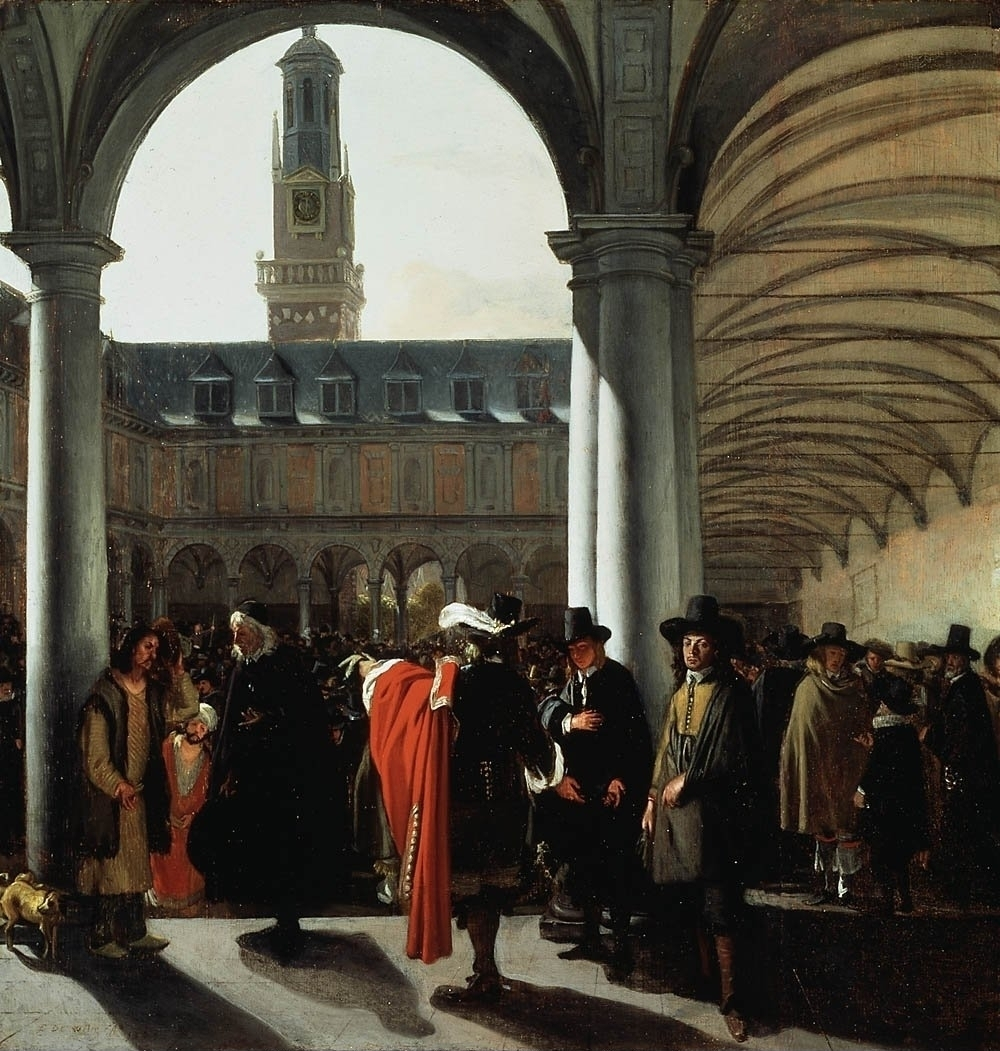
Courtyard of the Amsterdam Stock Exchange by Emanuel de Witte (1653)

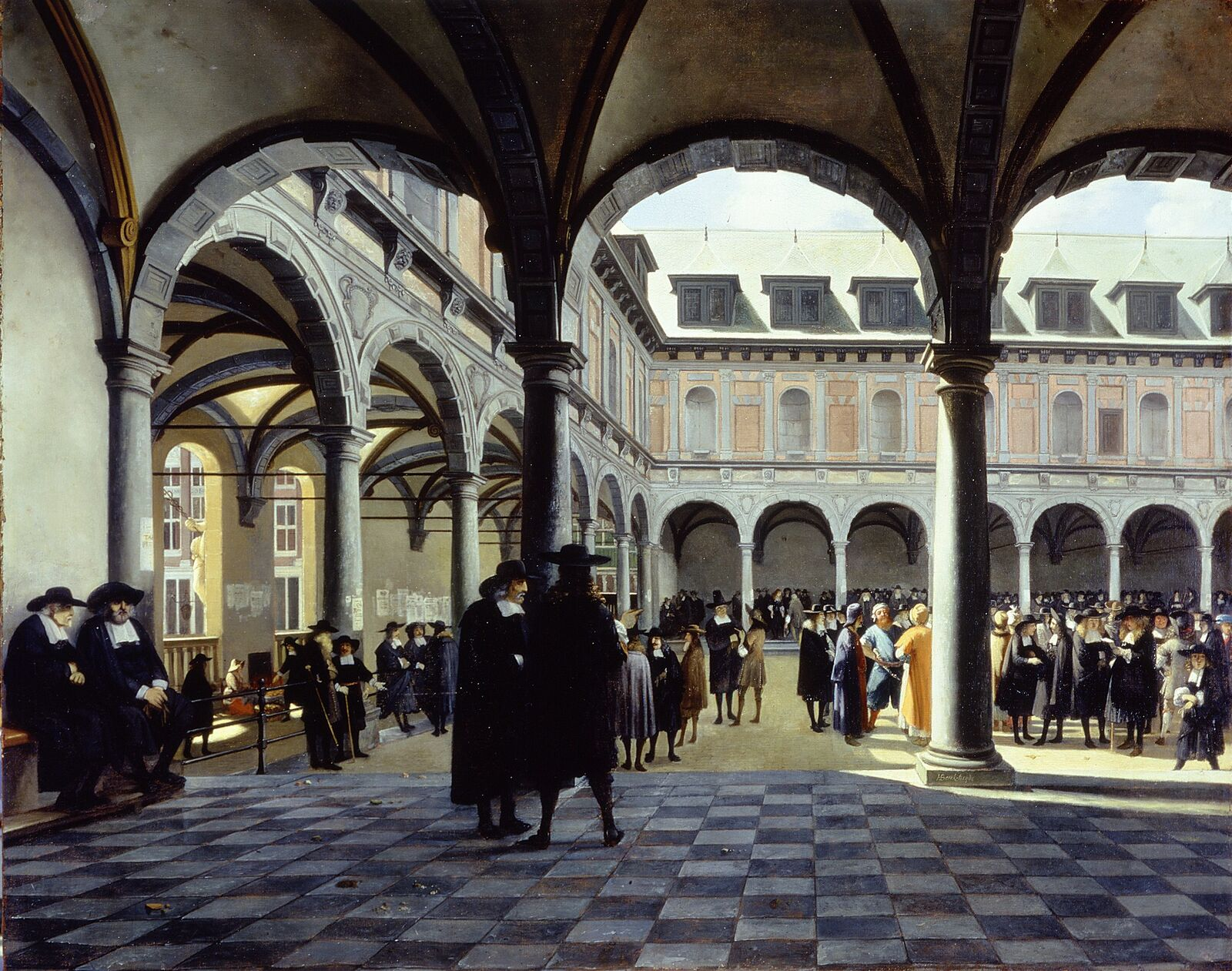
Courtyard of the Amsterdam Stock Exchange by Job Berckheyde, circa 1670.

Written in Spanish under the title Confusión de Confusiones, the volume was printed in Amsterdam and published in Antwerp. Although he did not provide a descriptive account of the process of stock trading, Joseph presented a history of speculation in stocks and ducatons, acquainting the reader with the sophisticated financial instruments used. He employed a dialogue format that enabled the reader to understand the respective perspectives of the various market participants and the intricacies of speculation and trading. There is evidence in Confusión de Confusiones of three major biases: herd behavior, overconfidence, and regret aversion.

Joseph also came up with four basic principles that remain relevant today:

The first rule in speculation is: Never advise anyone to buy or sell shares. Where guessing correctly is a form of witchcraft, counsel cannot be put on airs.

The second rule: Accept both your profits and regrets. It is best to seize what comes to hand when it comes, and not expect that your good fortune and the favorable circumstances will last.

The third rule: Profit in the share market is goblin treasure: at one moment, it is carbuncles, the next it is coal; one moment diamonds, and the next pebbles. Sometimes, they are the tears that Aurora leaves on the sweet morning's grass, at other times, they are just tears.

The fourth rule: He who wishes to become rich from this game must have both money and patience.

== Legacy ==
Joseph de la Vega, who used his mother′s last name, wrote over 200 letters to different princes and statesmen. Confusión de Confusiones remained little known until 1892, when German economist Richard Ehrenberg published an influential essay in the Jahrbücher für Nationalökonomie und Statistik entitled "Die Amsterdamer Aktienspekulation im 17. Jahrhundert." According to L. Petram, Joseph devoted a disproportionate amount of attention to tricks and schemes; his book is riddled with too much drama and too many technical shortcomings to be useful as an instruction manual. Joseph wrote Confusión primarily for the entertainment of educated members of the Sephardic community (the Academia de los Floridos).

Since 2000, the Federation of European Securities Exchanges has awarded the annual De La Vega Prize to "young European researchers who distinguish themselves by outstanding research on the securities markets in Europe".

== Other works ==
Other of his works include:

- Discurso académico moral. Hecho en la Insigne Academia de los Sitibundos (Amsterdam, 1683; dedicated to Isaac Senior Texeira in Hamburg).
- Triunfos del águila y eclipses de la luna (ib. 1683).
- La Rosa, Panegírico Sacro, Hecho en la Insigne Academia de los Sitibundos (ib. 1683).
- Rumbos peligrosos por donde navega con título de novelas la zozobrante nave de la temeridad (Antwerp, 1684).
- Discursos académicos, morales, retóricos, y sagrados. Recitados en la Florida Academia de los Floridos (ib. 1685).
- Retrato de la Prudencia, y simulacro del Valor, al Augusto Monarca Guilielmo Tercero, Rey de la Gran Bretaña (ib. 1690), printed by Joan Bus, using the rare ascendonica italic.
- Vega, José La (1692). Ideas possibles de que se compone un curioso ramillete de fragrantes flores, cultivadas y regidas por Don José de la Vega. Antwerp. This collection of short essays includes a section of five essays translated from Italian authors (Giovanni Battista Manzini, Ferrante Pallavicino, Vicenzo Pasqualigo, Antonio Lupis and Giovanni Francesco Loredan), followed by seven more that the author wrote himself.

== Source ==
- Valuation Of Equity Securities: History, Theory And Application by Geoffrey Poitras
