= Icha =

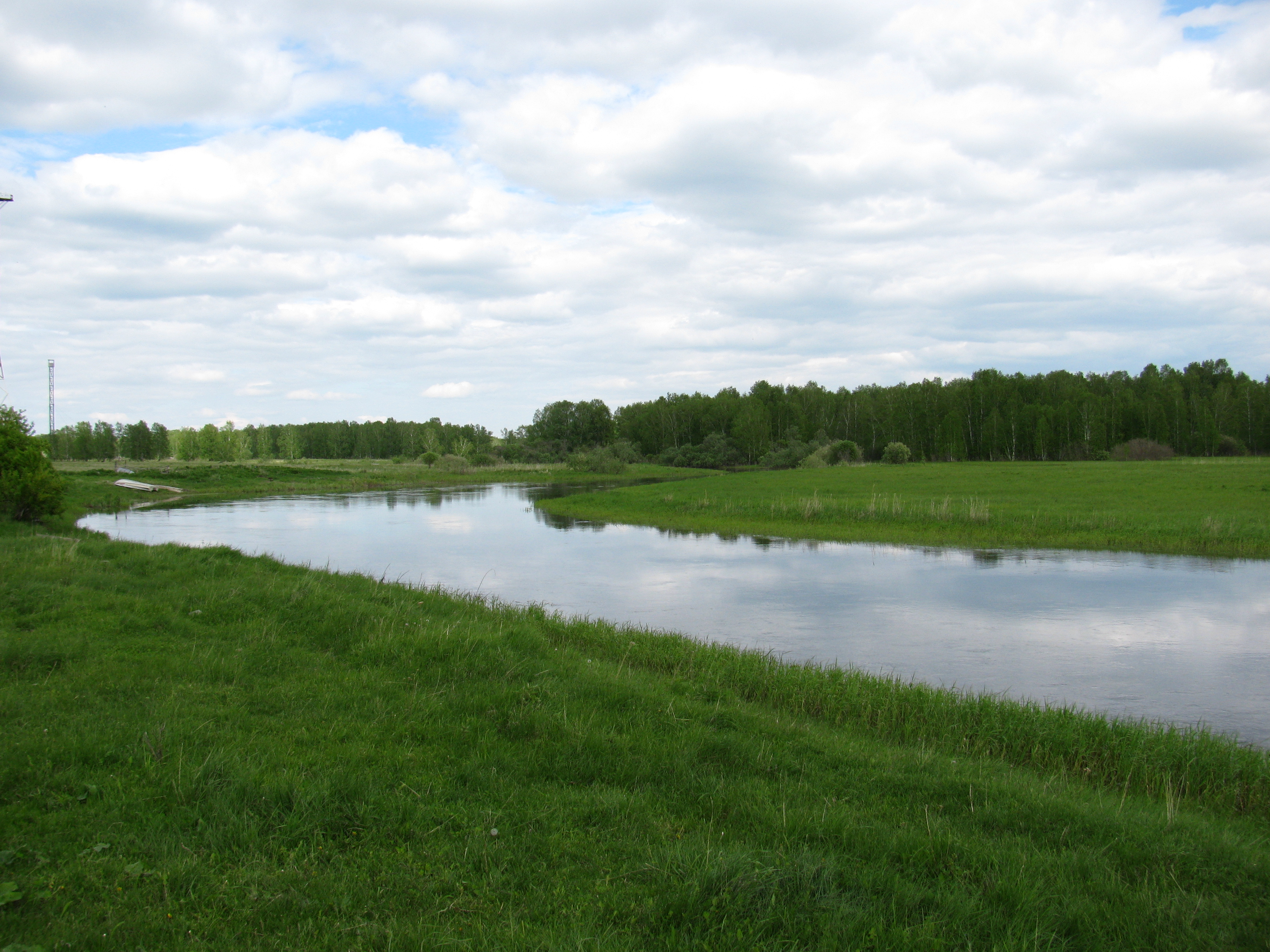
- Native name: Ича (Russian)

Location
- Country: Russia
- Region: Novosibirsk Oblast

Physical characteristics
- Mouth: Om
  - coordinates: 55°30′30″N 77°13′20″E
- Length: 257 km (160 mi)

Basin features
- Progression: Om→ Irtysh→ Ob→ Kara Sea

The Icha (Russian: Ича) is a river in Severny District of Novosibirsk Oblast, Russia. Its length is 257 km (160 mi), with a drainage basin of 3570 square kilometres. The river is a right tributary of the Om.
