= Joseph Athias =

Merchant and Hebrew Bible publisher (c. 1635 – 1700)

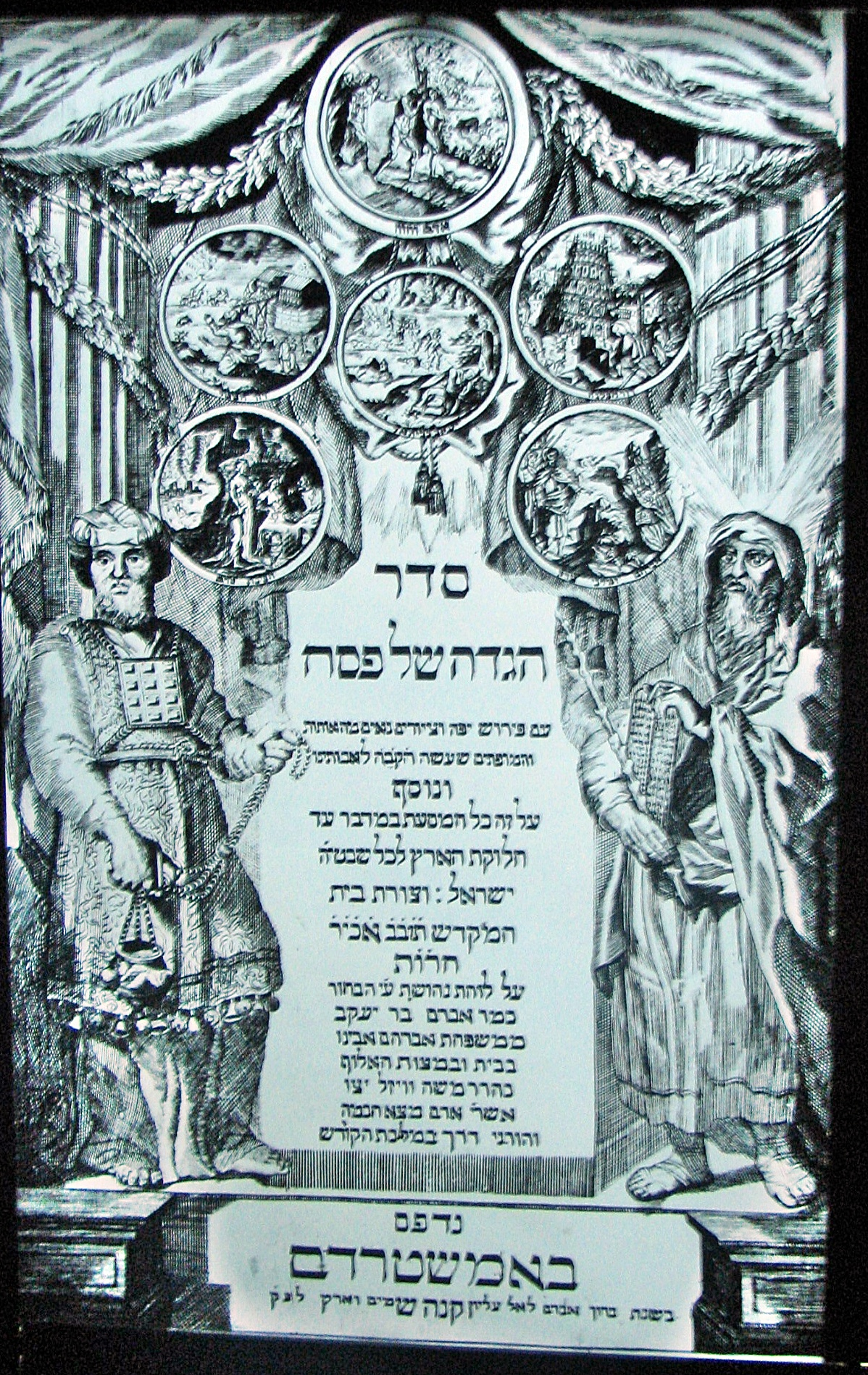
Title page of a Passover Haggadah illustrated in Amsterdam (1695)

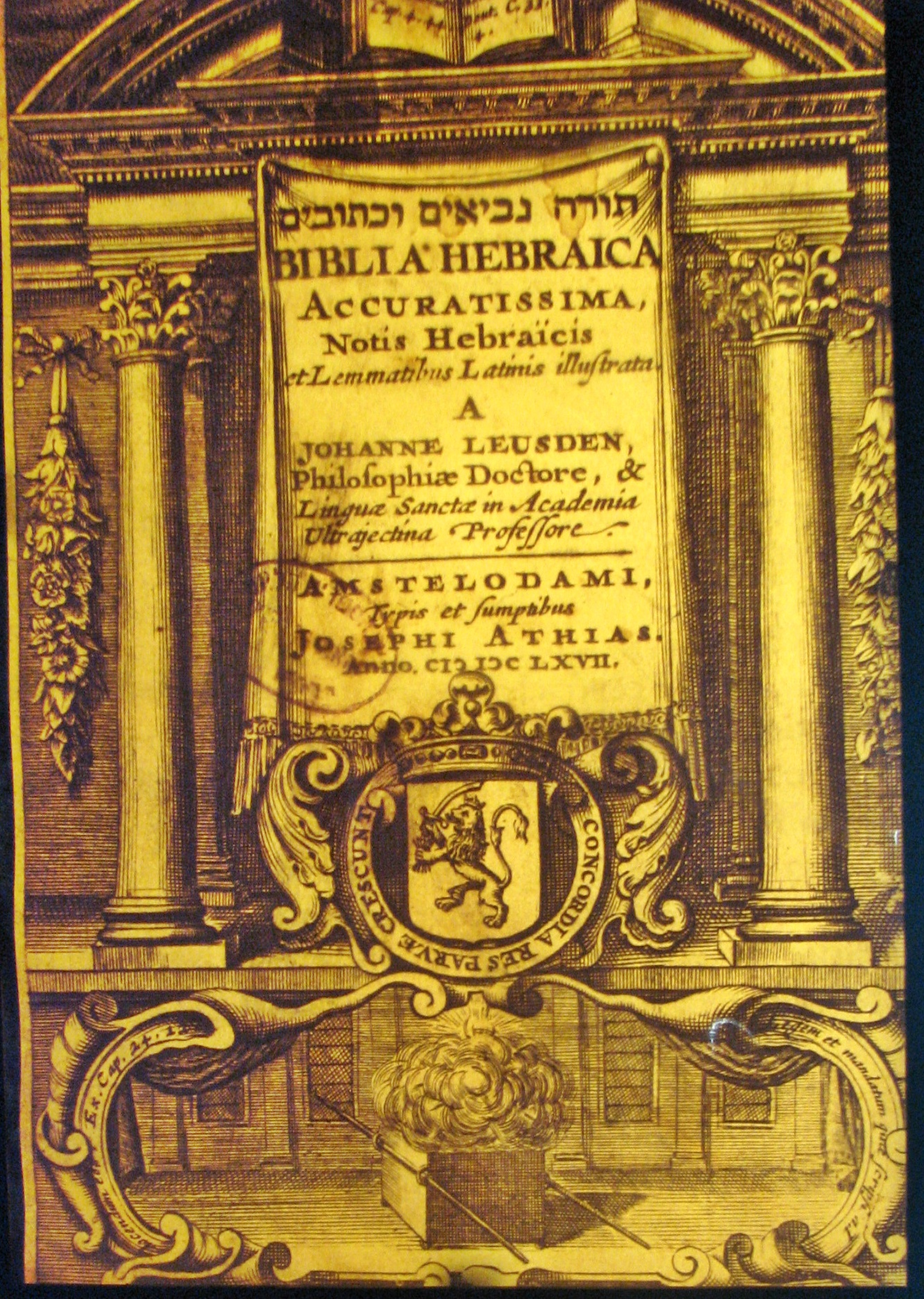
Title page of the Hebrew Bible printed by Athias in 1667

Joseph Athias (c. 1635 – 12 May 1700) was a merchant, bookprinter and the publisher of a famous Hebrew Bible which was approved by States-General of the Dutch Republic and both Jewish and Christian theologians.

== Life ==
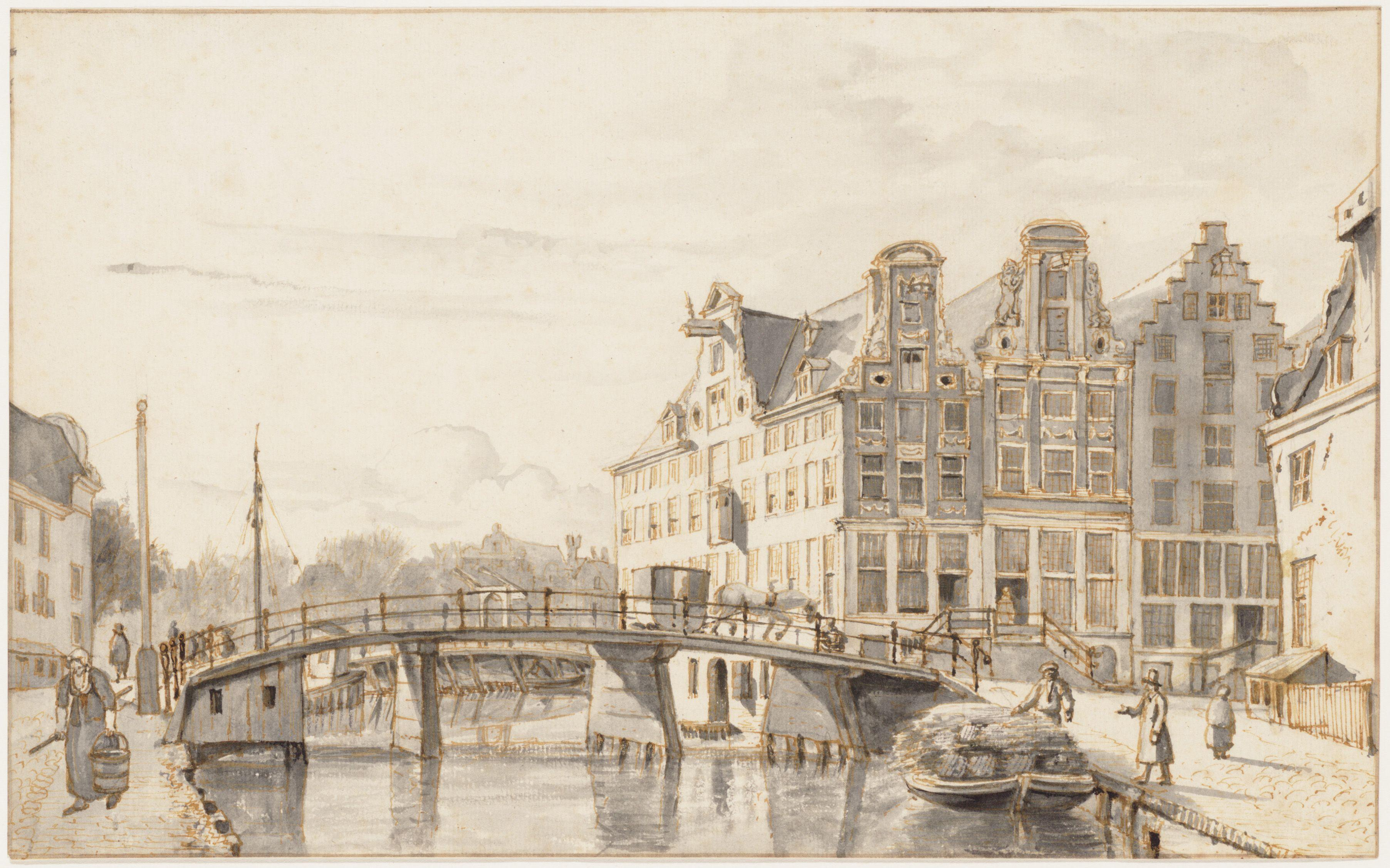
The printing house on the corner of Zwanenburgerstraat (Waterlooplein) with the Amstel river in the background

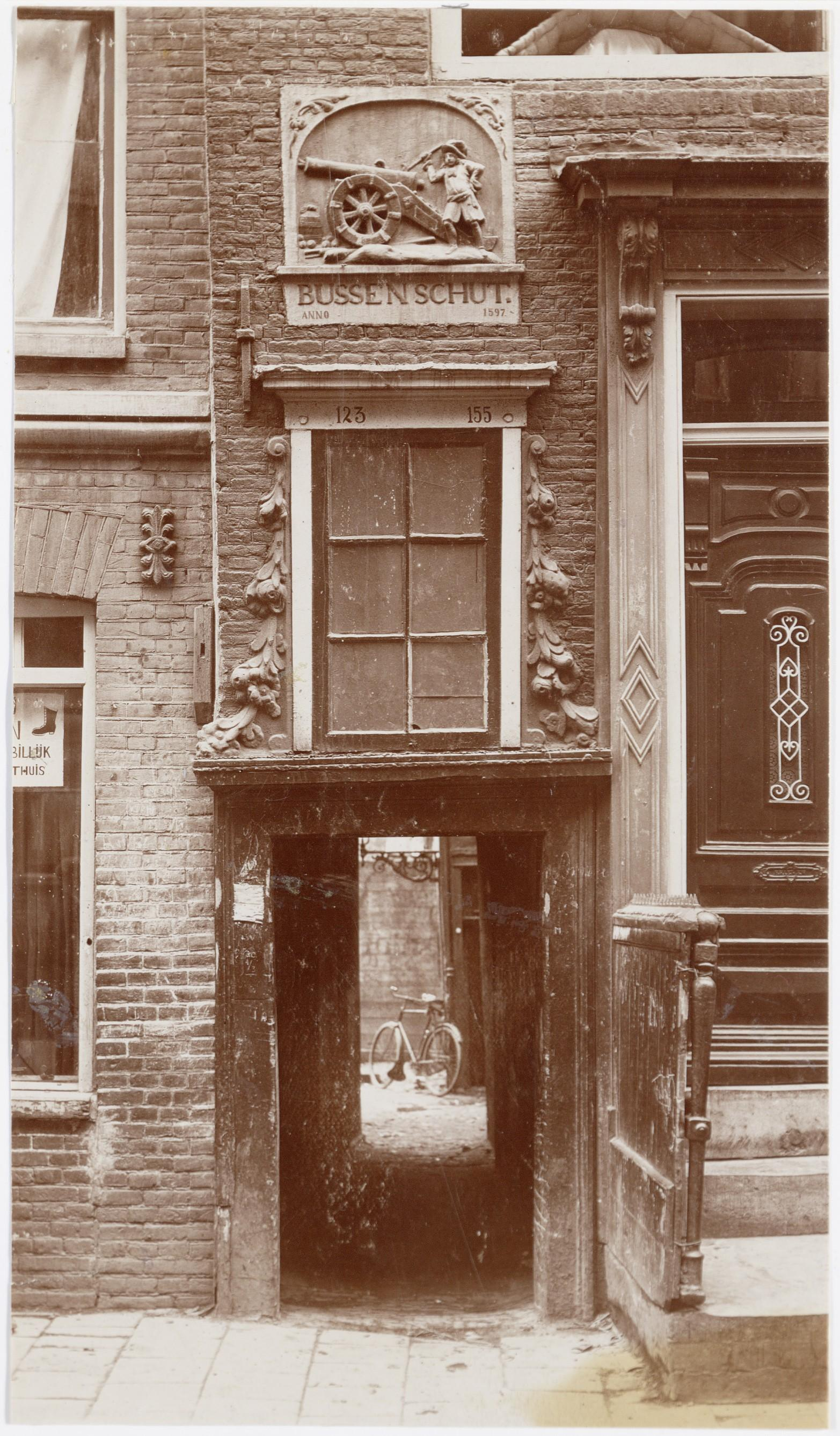
The alley in the Rapenburgerstraat, which Athias bought from Bussenschut

Joseph was born in Lisbon as the son of Abraham Athias. It seems Joseph was a member of the Jewish community in Recife between 1648 and 1653, but he and his cousin Jacob (1631-1690) settled in Amsterdam after the Portuguese reconquered Dutch Brazil in 1654. (Note: The cousins married two sisters Duarte. A third sister was married to Manuel Levi, who cooperated with his brother-in-law Jacob Athias in selling diamonds and pearls, obtained in Goa and mainly sold to Olympe Mancini. Both served as parnassim.) (Note: In 1665 his father Jorge Mendez de Castro, alias Abraham Athias was publicly burned, together with Jacob Rodriguez and Rachel Nunez Fernandez, on 4 May 1667, by the Inquisition at Cordova, Spain on account of his religion.) His first book, a prayer book according to the Sephardi rite, was published in 1658. In 1661 and 1667, he issued two editions of the Hebrew Bible with (Arabic) numbered verses. The second edition of his Bible was more carefully prepared than the first, and with more beautiful type and decorations. The mediaeval original he received from Moses Curiel. Until the 19th century it was regarded as one of the best bibles in Hebrew available.

Though carefully printed, they contain a number of mistakes in the vowel points and the accents. But as they were based on the earlier editions compared with the best manuscripts, they were the foundation of all the subsequent editions. The copious marginal notes in Latin added by Jean de Leusden, professor at Utrecht, were of little value. The 1667 edition was strongly opposed by the Protestant Samuel Desmarets; Athias answered the charges in a work whose title begins: Caecus de coloribus. Athias’ pamphlet was a full-blown attack on a senior Christian theologian in the United Provinces of the Netherlands. The true author of the pamphlet was not Athias but Johannes Leusden, and that the Utrecht professor had published it in Athias’ name, an assessment that scholars have followed ever since.

Athias was not allowed to sell books, just like Menasseh Ben Israel in 1640. In 1672 when the Dutch were in war with three countries, Athias had an enormous debt and 11,000 unsold English Bibles and 10,000 Hebrew children en prayerbooks stored in a warehouse, behind the Zuiderkerk. From 1673 he received a privilege to print more English Bibles, which seem to have been smuggled out of the country. He cooperated with Susanne Veselaer, the widow of the bookseller Jan Jacobsz. Schipper, and published works in Spanish and Portuguese. He experimented with textile printing and they employed 25 (journey)men. By using stereotypes he was able to publish very quickly, 250 bibles in four hours, but had to invest in metallic movable types? It seems he printed thin from cast metal plates, rather than directly from movable types. (In 1678 he buried his wife at Beth Haim of Ouderkerk aan de Amstel.)

It is likely Athias had to use a reseller to distribute his stock; one of them was Joseph Deutz, a banker and an art collector. In 1681 he bought more letter cases by Christoffel van Dijck from the estate of Daniel Elzevir. Athias was boycotted by five lettercasters and their pupils. In 1683 the Athias moved from Zwanenburgerstraat, owned by his brothers-in-law, to Utrechtsestraat? In 1686 he moved to Nieuwe Herengracht and rented his accommodation, the printing house and type foundry from his business partner Susanne Veselaer. (She invested in real estate and owned a country house in Soest. Athias only owned half of plot and the alley leading to the backhouse.) It is likely he assisted and advised his son Manuel and Joan Bus. In 1687 he auctioned 3,000 bibles (Old Testament), available for less than one euro each. In 1690 Joseph Penso de la Vega, who had used Athias' services earlier, had his Retrato de la Prudencia, y simulacro del Valor, al Augusto Monarca Guilielmo Tercero, Rey de la Gran Bretaña printed by Bus, using the rare ascendonica italic.

In 1695 he went bankrupt and hide himself for several months because of debts. In May 1696 he and his son came to an agreement with the 22 creditors. He died early May 1700 shortly after publishing the Confessiones by Augustine. In 1702 Manuel seems to have sold half of plot to Cornelia Schipper, the heir of Veselaer; in 1705 he sold her the alley. In 1710 Manuel was ordered to vacate the printing house and foundry. The matrices stored in cabinet, can be seen in the Amsterdam Museum.

The Athias published 450 works, such as Megillot and Hafṭarot and a Yiddish translation of the Bible (1678) that did not sell well. The latter involved Athias in a competition with Uri Phoebus Halevi. The Mishneh Torah by Maimonides, and a commentary by Abraham de Boton was printed by Manuel, like the Order of the Book of the Law.
