= Tartas (river) =

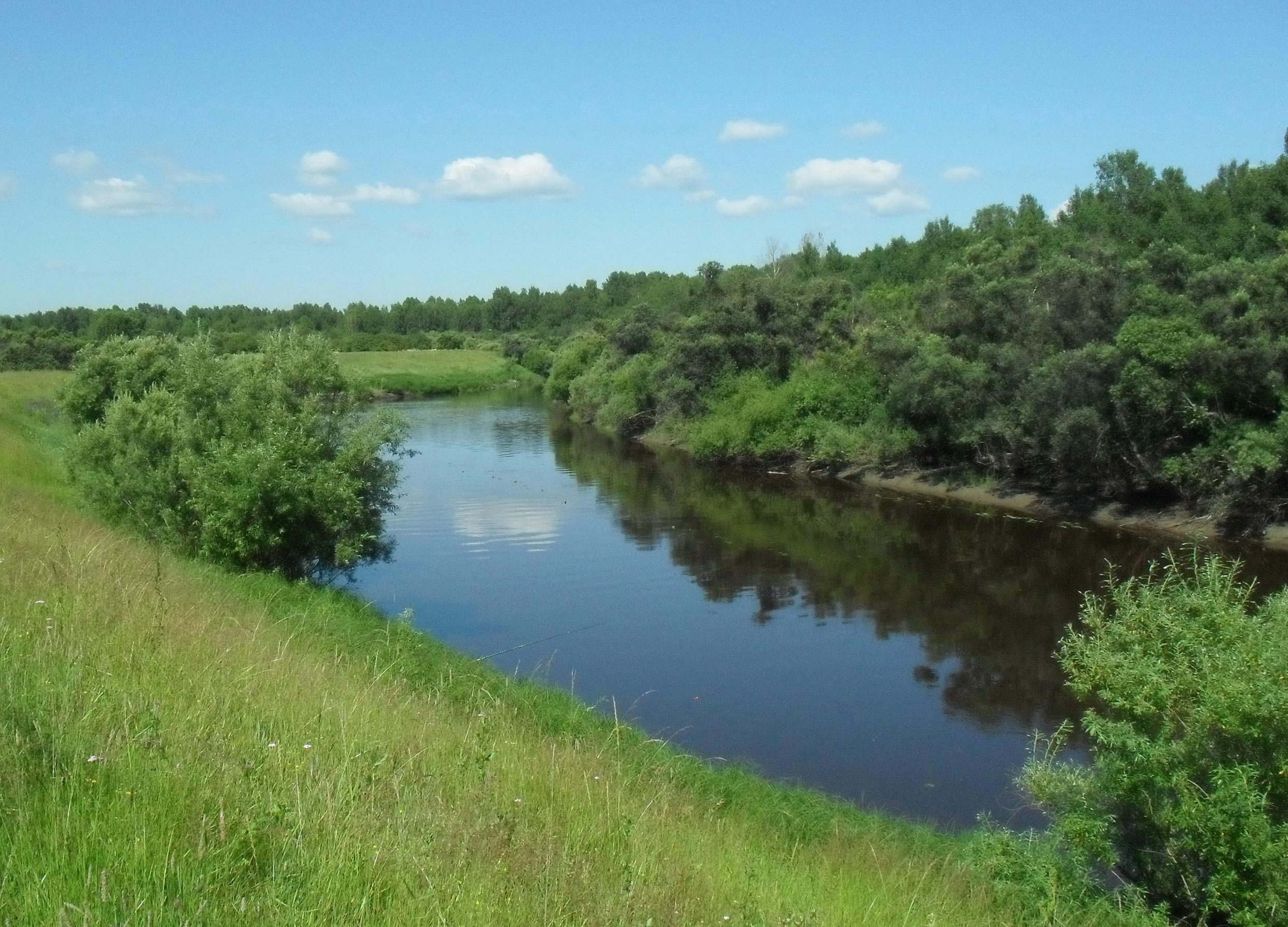
- Native name: Тартас (Russian)

Location
- Country: Russia
- Region: Novosibirsk Oblast

Physical characteristics
- Mouth: Om
  - coordinates: 55°37′06″N 76°44′00″E
- Length: 566 km (352 mi)

Basin features
- Progression: Om→ Irtysh→ Ob→ Kara Sea

The Tartas (Russian: Тартас) is a river in Novosibirsk Oblast, Russia, right tributary of the Om. Its length is 566 km (352 mi), drainage basin is 16 200 km2.

The source of the river is on the Vasyugan Plain in Novosibirsk Oblast between the Ob and the Irtysh, it is located at an altitude of 150 meters above sea level.

== Tributaries ==
River tributaries: Izess (128 km), Urez (140 km), Aryncass (216 km), Urgulka (296 km), untitled river (368 km), Zunkuy (376 km), untitled river (377 km ), untitled river (393 km), Raktitovka (408 km), Tai-Das (450 km), Termyak (481 km), Kaygach (501 km).
