= Abraham Shalom Friedberg =

Russian Jewish Hebrew writer, editor and translator

- אַבְרָהָם שָׁלוֹם פְרִידְבֶּרְג
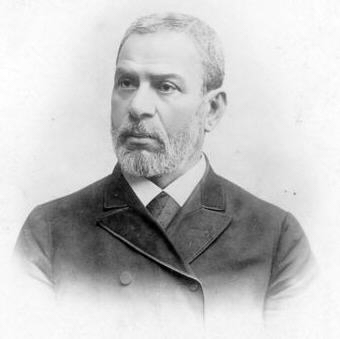
- Born: 6 November 1838; Grodno, Russian Empire
- Died: 21 March 1902 (aged 63); Warsaw, Russian Empire
- Resting place: Warsaw Jewish Cemetery
- Children: Isabella Grinevskaya
- Writing career
- Pen name: Har Shalom
- Language: Hebrew, Yiddish

Abraham Shalom Friedberg (Hebrew: אַבְרָהָם שָׁלוֹם פְרִידְבֶּרְג; 6 November 1838, Grodno – 20 March 1902, Warsaw), known also by the pen name Har Shalom (Hebrew: הַר שָׁלוֹם) and the acronym Hash (Hebrew: הַ״שׁ), was a Russian Jewish Hebrew writer, editor, and translator.

== Biography ==
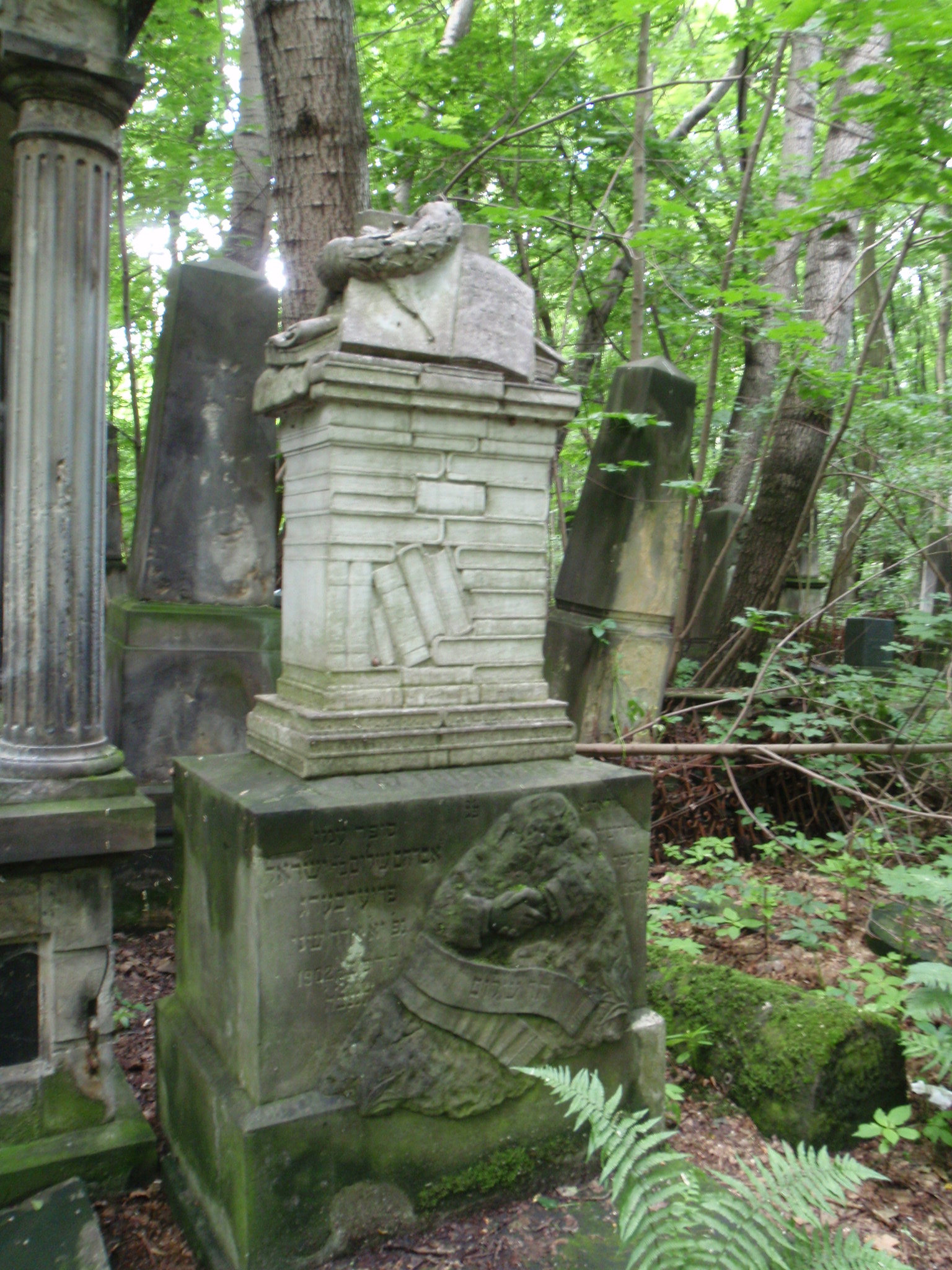
Grave of Abraham Shalom Friedberg at the Warsaw Jewish Cemetery.

Abraham Shalom Friedberg was born at Grodno on 6 November 1838. At the age of thirteen he was orphaned and apprenticed to a watchmaker; three years later he went to Brest-Litovsk, and afterward to the southern Russian Empire, spending two years in Kishinev.

On returning to Grodno in 1858 Friedberg acquired a knowledge of German and Russian, and became a teacher of Hebrew in wealthy families. His first Hebrew work Emek ha-Arazim, a historical novel inspired by Grace Aguilar's Vale of Cedars, was published in Warsaw in 1875, which enjoyed great popularity. Later he engaged in business, but was financially ruined in 1881–82. He then devoted himself exclusively to literary work.

Friedberg was an early member of the proto-Zionist Ḥibbat Zion movement, which he joined after the pogroms of 1881, and began to campaign for Jewish settlement in the Land of Israel in the pages of Ha-Melitz. In 1883 he moved to Saint Petersburg and became the newspaper's associate editor. In 1886 he accepted a similar position on Ha-Tzfirah and settled in Warsaw, and in 1888 became editor of Ha-Eshkol, a Hebrew encyclopaedia, of which only a few instalments appeared. In the same year he became government censor of Hebrew and Yiddish books in Warsaw, which position he retained until 1891.

Friedberg's daughter Beyle, known by the pen name Isabella Grinevskaya, was a successful novelist, poet, and dramatist.

== Work ==
Friedberg's Rab le-Hoshia (Warsaw, 1886), which was first published in Ha-Tzfirah, is a translation of Asher Sammter's Rabbi von Liegnitz. In the year-book Keneset Yisrael for 1886 appeared his "Ir u-Behalot," a translation of Lev Levanda's humorous story "Gnev i milost magnata"; and in the Ha-Asif of the same year his translations of short stories by Alphonse Daudet and Ivan Turgenev.

Friedberg is perhaps best known for his historical works. His Korot ha-Yehudim bi-Sefarad (Warsaw, 1893) is a history of the Jews in Spain. Zikronot le-bet David (Warsaw, 1893–97), a history of the Jewish people, was published in four parts between 1893 and 1897, the first two adapted from Hermann Reckendorf's Geheimnisse der Juden. The work was frequently republished and was translated into Arabic and Persian.

Sefer ha-Torah veha-Ḥayyim, a three-volume translation of Moritz Güdemann's Geschichte des Erziehungswesen, with notes, additions, and a preface, was published in Warsaw between 1896 and 1899. He also wrote a collection of memoirs, besides numerous articles, feuilletons, and translations.
