= Proops =

Proops is a surname. Notable people with the surname include:

- Greg Proops (born 1959), American actor, stand-up comedian, and television host
- Marjorie Proops (1911–1996), British advice columnist
