= Moses Raphael de Aguilar =

Rabbi, Hebrew scholar and author

Personal life
- Born: 1611
- Died: 1679 (aged 67–68)

Religious life
- Religion: Judaism

Rabbi Moses Raphael de Aguilar (c. 1611 – 15 December 1679) was a Sephardic-Dutch rabbi, Hebrew Grammatician and scholar, who wrote more than 20 books on various topics : a commentary on biblical verses, a Hebrew grammar, books on Jewish law, and treatises on Aristotelian logic a classical Greek and Roman literature. He was an erudite classical scholar, an important lecturer at the Amsterdam Talmud Torah, taught at Ets Haim and ran a successful private school.

== Biography ==
Born c. 1611 in Portugal, his parents Abraham de Aguilar and Violante de Paz were Crypto-Jews, who moved to the Netherlands during the Eighty Years' War. It was there, that Moses briefly served as a teacher at the Amsterdam Talmud Torah, however in 1641, he, his wife Esther de Castro Tartas, his wife's nephew Isaac de Castro Tartas and about 600 other Dutch Jews, including Isaac Aboab da Fonseca moved to Brazil, following its Dutch colonization. It was in Brazil that he became the rabbi of the Magen Avraham congregation of Recife. Although Moses' time in Brazil was short, and following the Portuguese recolonization of the region, he alongside most of the Brazilian Jewish community returned to Amsterdam. On his return to Amsterdam, he opened a private Yeshiva where he wrote some 20 books, but only two were published in his lifetime. He died on December 15, 1679, in Amsterdam.

== Works and legacy ==
He introduced his students to the Trivium, the medieval and Renaissance curriculum of Liberal Arts for the study of Logic, Grammar, and Rhetoric, to educate future generations in the appreciation of literary composition. His knowledge of logic assisted the teachers of his time, such as Isaac Orobio and Menasseh Ben Israel, in adding understanding and elegant style to the arguments they contributed to the Republic of Letters. He possessed a good collection of Greek sources, like Aristotle and Plato; Latin sources, including Seneca, Virgil, Quintilian Horace, and most works of Cicero; and other universal authors such as Augustine. Book Three of his Treaty of Aristotle's Logic (p. 137) proclaims the argument of his vision.

=== Students ===
Moses de Aguilar had many students, some notable of which are:

- Menasseh Ben Israel
- Isaac Orobio de Castro
- Joseph de la Vega
- Abraham Pereyra

=== Works ===
Some of his most famous works are as follows:

- Epitome Grammatica hebrayca – a treatise on Hebrew grammar.
- Dinim de shehita y bedica – a basic overview of the rules of Shechita.
- Zekher Rab – a collection of all the Midrashim in the Talmud.
- Sefer Hama’asim – a collection of all the stories in the Talmud.
- Tratado da Immortalidade da Alma – a book written in response to the Jewish heretic Uriel de Acosta, who denied the principles of the Jewish faith.
- Tratado de la verdad de la lei de Moseh – a book espousing the truth of Mosaic law.
