= Tarta =

Tarta or TARTA may refer to:

- Tartá, real name Vinícius Silva Soares, (born 1989), Brazilian footballer
- Tarta, a character in Magic Knight Rayearth
- Alexandre Tarta (born 1928), French TV and film director and producer
- Tarta de Santiago, literally 'cake of St. James', an almond cake or pie from Galicia
- Tarta de seso, a beef-brain pie in Colombian cuisine
- Toledo Area Regional Transit Authority

== See also ==
- Aqua Tarta Music, Canadian record label
- Tartas (disambiguation)
