= Om (river) =

River in Omsk Oblast, Russia

Om Омь
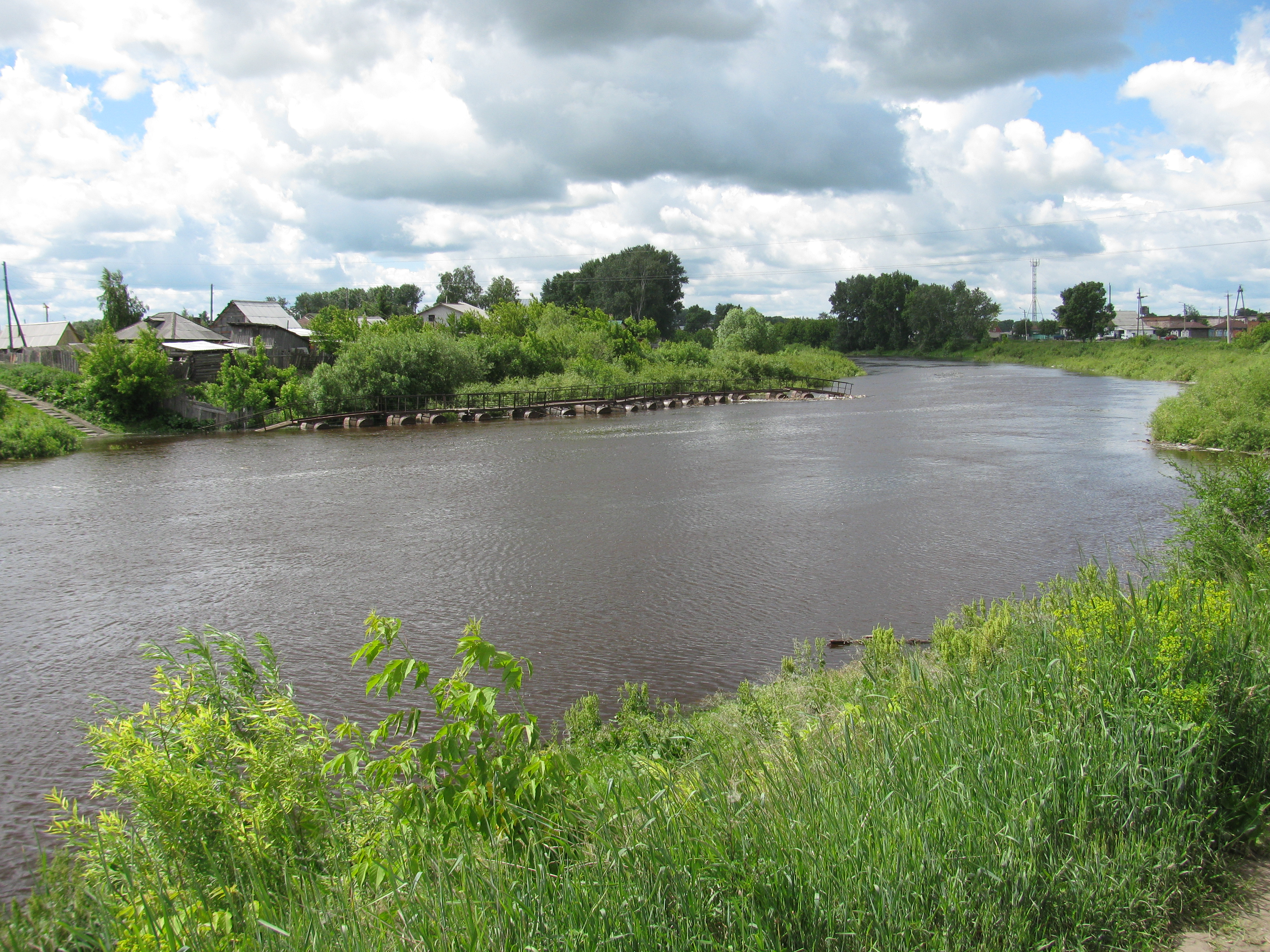
- The Om in Kuybyshev

Location
- Country: Russia

Physical characteristics
- Mouth: Irtysh
  - coordinates: 54.9817°N 73.3694°E
- Length: 1,091 km (678 mi)
- Basin size: 52,600 km^{2} (20,300 sq mi)
- Discharge
  - average: 64 m^{3}/s (2,300 cu ft/s) 121 km from the mouth

Basin features
- Progression: Irtysh→ Ob→ Kara Sea

The Om (Russian: Омь, Siberian Tatar: Ом) is a river in the south of the Western Siberian plains in Russia. It is a right tributary of the Irtysh. It is 1,091 kilometres (678 mi) long, and has a drainage basin of 52,600 square kilometres (20,300 sq mi).

The name is probably from the word om "quiet" in the language of the Baraba Tatars.

== Course ==
The Om rises in the Vasyugan Swamp at the border of Novosibirsk and Tomsk oblasts. It flows mainly across the Baraba Lowland of the West Siberian Plain. The city of Omsk is situated at the confluence of Om and Irtysh, and Ust-Tarka at the confluence of the Om and the Tarka rivers. The main tributaries are the Icha, Kama and Tartas.
