= Ust-Tarka =

Rural locality in Novosibirsk Oblast, Russia

Ust-Tarka Усть-Тарка
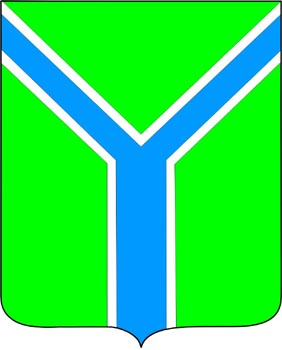
- Coat of arms
- Interactive map of Ust-Tarka
- Location of Ust-Tarka Ust-Tarka (Novosibirsk Oblast)
- Coordinates: 55°34′02″N 75°41′28″E
- Country: Russia
- Federal subject: Novosibirsk Oblast
- Administrative district: Ust-Tarksky District
- Founded: 1752
- Elevation: 110 m (360 ft)

Population (2010 Census)
  - Total: 3,819
  - Estimate (2021): 4,054 (+6.2%)
- Time zone: UTC+7 (MSK+4)
- Postal code: 632161
- OKTMO ID: 50655425101

Ust-Tarka (Russian: Усть-Тарка) is a rural locality (a selo) and the administrative center of Ust-Tarksky District, Novosibirsk Oblast, Russia.

Population: 3,819 (2010 census); 4,381 (2002 census); 4,395 (1989 Soviet census).

== Geography ==
Ust-Tarka lies on the bank of the Om River by the confluence of the Tarka River, 509 kilometers (316 mi) west of Novosibirsk and 52 kilometers (32 mi) north of Tatarsk, where the Trans-Siberian Railway station is located.
