= Samuel Maresius =

French Protestant theologian (1599–1673)

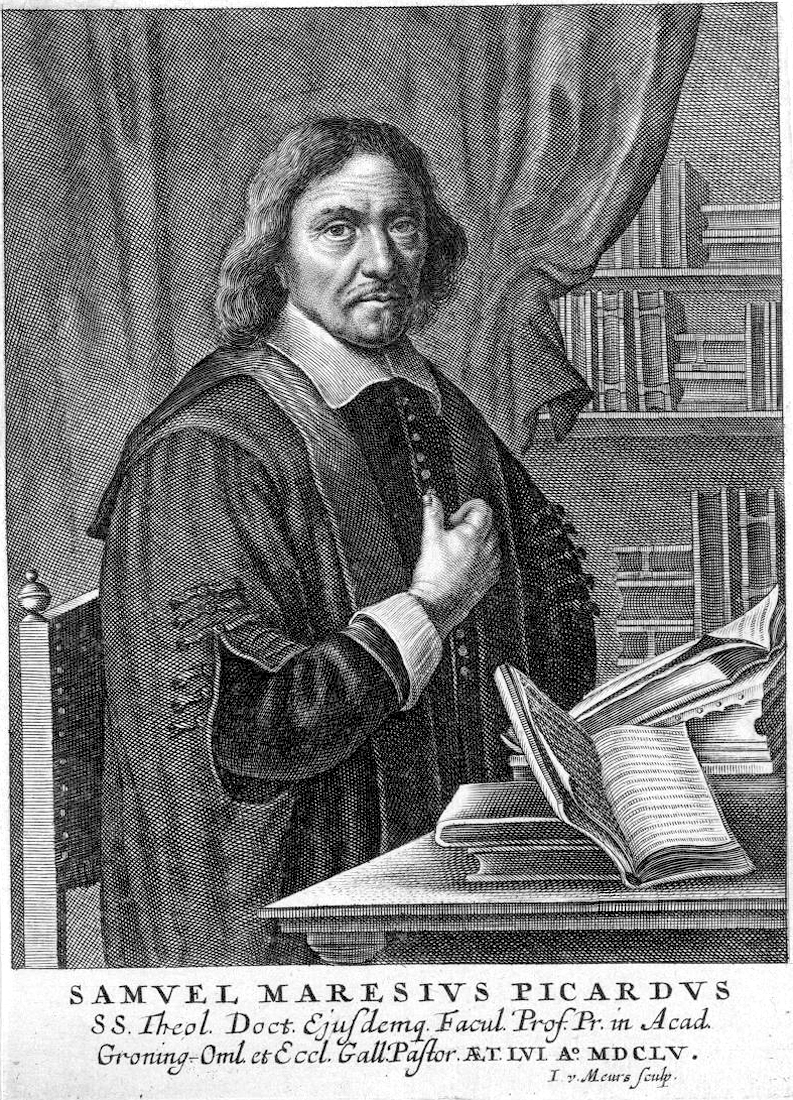
Samuel Maresius (1599–1673) (Jacob van Meurs (I), 1655)

Samuel Des Marets or Desmarets (Latin: Maresius; Oisemont, 1599 – Groningen, 18 May 1673) was a French Protestant theologian.

== Life ==
He was born in Picardy, northern France. He studied in Paris, in Saumur Academy under Gomarus, and in Geneva at the time of the Synod of Dort. He was ordained in 1620, and preached at Laon until a controversy with Roman Catholic missionaries. Feeling his life was in danger, he left in 1624. which led to an attack on his life.

He became professor at the Academy of Sedan (1625), pastor at Maastricht (1632), pastor and professor at 's-Hertogenbosch (1636), and at Groningen (1643). He won a reputation that led to calls to Saumur, Marburg, Lausanne, and Leiden. He died at Groningen on 18 May 1673.

== Works ==
He wrote more than one hundred works, including a Systhema theologiae (Groningen, 1645; 4th ed., 1673, with an appendix giving a list of his writings), worked out in scholastic fashion, which was much used as a textbook. His literary activity was chiefly polemical, against Roman Catholics, Socinians, Arminians, Amyraldism as represented by Dallaeus, Chiliasm and other views.
