= HaMelitz =

Hebrew-language newspaper published in Imperial Russia (1860–1904)

HaMelitz המליץ
- Type: Weekly newspaper (until 1886); Daily newspaper (from 1886 until 1904)
- Founded: 29 September 1860
- Language: Hebrew
- Ceased publication: 1904
- Country: Russian Empire
- Free online archives: Online, searchable Hamelitz editions from the Historical Jewish Press

HaMelitz (Hebrew: המליץ, lit. 'Defender', Russian: «Ха-Мелиц») was the first Hebrew newspaper in the Russian Empire. It was founded by Alexander Zederbaum in Odessa in 1860.

== History ==
HaMelitz first appeared as a weekly, and it began to appear daily in 1886. From 1871, it was published in Saint Petersburg. Publication was suspended several times for lack of support or by order of the authorities. In 1893, Leon Rabinowitz succeeded Zederbaum as the editor.

HaMelitz was a representative of the progressive or haskalah movement, and even so severe a critic as Abraham Kovner admitted that it had been "more useful to the Jews than have the other Hebrew newspapers" (Ḥeḳer Dabar, p. 52 ff., Warsaw, 1866). While it was not so literary or scientific as some of its contemporaries, HaMelitz usually had more news and debates of interest, and was consequently more popular.

J. A. Goldenblum was for many years associated with Zederbaum in its publication. Abraham Shalom Friedberg and Judah Leib Gordon were the best known of its associate editors. Almost every prominent Hebrew writer of its times contributed to it.

Several collections of literary and scientific articles appeared as supplements to HaMelitz in Zederbaum's time: Ḳohelet (Saint Petersburg, 1881), Migdonot (1883), Melitẓ Aḥad Minni Elef (on the occasion of the appearance of No. 1,000; Saint Petersburg, 1884), Leḳeṭ Amarim (1889), and Arba'ah Ma'amarim (1893). Among similar publications issued by Zederbaum's successor were HaYeḳev (Saint Petersburg, 1894), HaOsem and HaGat (1897), and HaGan (1899).

HaMelitz was intermittently published until 1903.

== See also ==
- Der Beobachter an der Weichsel, the first Jewish newspaper
