= Sol Liptzin =

Scholar of Yiddish and German (1901–1995)

Solomon Liptzin
- סאָל ליפּצין
- Born: July 27, 1901; Sataniv, Russian Empire (now Ukraine)
- Died: November 15, 1995 (aged 94); Jerusalem
- Education: City College of New York, Columbia University
- Spouse: Anna Ohrenstein Liptzin
- Children: Yelva L. Lynfield, Karen Sitton
- Writing career
- Language: Mostly English
- Subjects: Yiddish literature, German literature

Solomon "Sol" Liptzin (Yiddish: סאָל ליפּצין; July 27, 1901 – November 15, 1995) was a scholar, writer, and educator in Yiddish and German literature.

== Life ==
Liptzin was born in Sataniv, Russian Empire, and moved to New York at the age of nine. He graduated from City College of New York and did postgraduate work at the University of Berlin. He earned a master's degree and Ph.D. at Columbia University. His doctoral advisor was Robert Herndon Fife.

His stay in Berlin interested him in the romantic movement in 19th-century German literature.

Starting in 1923, Liptzin taught at City College. From 1943 to 1958 he served as the chairman of the Department of Germanic and Slavic Studies. He convinced college officials that Yiddish is a Germanic language laced with Hebrew and Russian, and that it should be taught as such in college.

He was active in Jewish affairs and was the honorary president of the Jewish Book Council of America, the editor of the Jewish Book Annual (1953–1956), departmental editor for German literature in the Encyclopaedia Judaica, the National Chairman of the Jewish State Zionists of America, the Academic Secretary of YIVO, and President of the College Yiddish Association. He was a visiting professor at Yeshiva University from 1929 to 1940.

In 1962, he moved to Israel, where he taught at Haifa University (1962–1963) and the Technion (1962–1966), where he founded the humanities program.

He was a founder of Bar-Ilan University (1955) He died on 15 November 1995 in Jerusalem.

== Bibliography ==
- Shelley in Germany (1924)
- Lyric Pioneers of Modern Germany (1928)
- Arthur Schnitzler: Studies in Austrian Literature, Culture and Thought (1932)
- Historical Survey of German Literature (1936)
- Richard Beer-Hofmann (1936)
- Germany's Stepchildren (1944)
- Stories from Peretz (1947)
- Eliakum Zunser: Poet of His People
- The English Legend of Heinrich Heine (1954)
- The Flowering of Yiddish Literature (1963)
- The Jew in American Literature (1966)
- The Maturing of Yiddish Literature (1970)
- A History of Yiddish Literature (1972)
- Biblical Themes in World Literature (1985)
