= David de Castro Tartas =

David ben Abraham de Castro Tartas (also David de Kastro Tartas; in Hebrew, דוד די קאסטרו תרטאס ) (Tartas, 1630-Amsterdam, 1698) was a Portuguese Jewish printer in Amsterdam. Between 1662 and 1701 his press printed the Gazeta de Amsterdam, a newspaper of the exiled Jewish community.

David was one of three sons of Portuguese "New Christians" who had escaped from Bragança, and settled, under the Catholic names Cristóvão Luís and Isabel da Paz in the French town of Tartas. In 1640 they moved to Amsterdam to live freely as Jews, retaining the surname "Tartas." David's older brother Isaac de Castro Tartas (ca. 1623-1647) stayed only 1 year in Amsterdam, emigrated to Brazil, and later was martyred in Lisbon.

David de Castro Tartas started as a typesetter in the printing house of Menasseh Ben Israel, where his name is mentioned in 1647. He later appears in 1662 as owner of his own press and in 1678 as a member of the Amsterdam Printers' Guild. His press competed with that of Uri Phoebus Halevi and the press of Joseph Athias.
