= Chaim Zhitlowsky =

Russian socialist and philosopher (1865–1943)

- חײם זשיטלאָװסקי
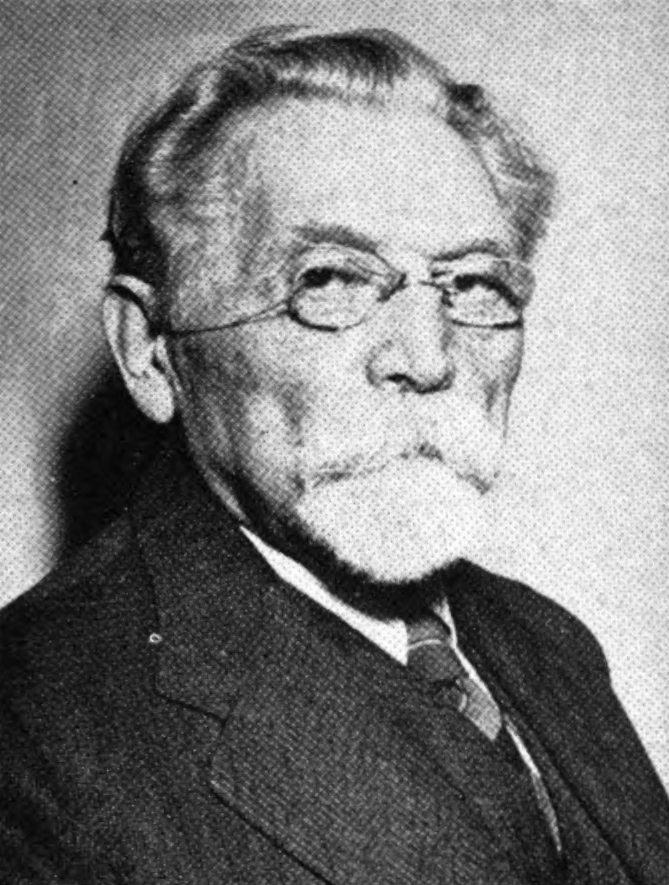
- Zhitlowsky c. 1930s
- Born: 19 April 1865; Ushachy, Vitebsk Governorate, Russian Empire
- Died: 6 May 1943 (aged 78); Calgary, Alberta, Canada
- Occupations: Philosopher and writer
- Known for: Founding the Union of Russian Socialist Revolutionaries Abroad and Socialist Revolutionary Party in Russia
- Political party: Socialist Revolutionary Party

Chaim Zhitlowsky (Yiddish: חײם זשיטלאָװסקי; Russian: Ха́им О́сипович Житло́вский) (April 19, 1865 – May 6, 1943) was a Jewish socialist, philosopher, social and political thinker, writer and literary critic born in Ushachy, Vitebsk Governorate, Russian Empire (present-day Usachy Raion, Vitebsk Region, Belarus).

He was a founding member and theoretician of the Union of Russian Socialist Revolutionaries Abroad and the Socialist Revolutionary Party in Russia, and a key promoter of Yiddishism and Jewish Diaspora nationalism, which influenced the Jewish territorialist and nationalist movements. He was an advocate of Yiddish language, culture and was a vice-president of the Czernowitz Yiddish Language Conference of 1908, which declared Yiddish to be "a national language of the Jewish people."

== Biography ==
=== Early years ===
Chaim Zhitlowsky was born in 1865, in the small town of Ushachy, in the Lepelsky Uyezd of Vitebsk Governorate in the Russian Empire. When he was five years old, his parents moved to the capital of the province, Vitebsk. On his mother's side, he was descended from artisans and merchants, and on his father's, came from an aristocratic and well-educated family. His father, Joseph, studied to be a rabbi in the Yeshiva of Volozhin, but chose to become a merchant. Though an ardent Lubavich Chassid he was well versed in Haskalah (enlightenment) literature and reportedly often recited satiric Haskalah tales and poems in Yiddish and Hebrew at family gatherings.

Joseph Zhitlowsky's business prospered. He moved to a richer, more exclusive section of the city and kept an open house. A tutor of the Russian language was engaged for Chaim, but he continued his elementary religious studies at a kheyder. Soon Chaim became friendly with high school students of his neighbourhood and began to read Russian literature. During this period he made his first foray into literature: translating the Yiddish version of Uncle Tom's Cabin into Hebrew.

On his 13th birthday (his bar-mitzvah) Chaim made the acquaintance of Shloyme Rappaport, who was later to become S. Ansky, the famous author of The Dybuk. A warm, lifelong friendship developed between Zhitlowsky and Ansky, who had writing in common. For a short time they issued a handwritten (holographic) magazine called Vitebsk Bells.

=== Early activity ===
On entering the third grade of the Russian Gymnasium in 1879, Zhitlowsky came into contact with revolutionary circles, and, for a time, was estranged from Yiddish and other matters of Jewish interest, advocating for assimilation into Russian culture. He rethought his positions, however, by the pogroms of the early 1880s, which dissipated his cosmopolitan interests. He left the gymnasium, and went to Tula in 1881, and there was engaged in spreading Socialist Revolutionary propaganda. Shocked by the view of some members of that party who believed that pogroms were a step toward the liberation of the Russian people, he left the party. He turned, instead, to advocating for Jewish equality, and aligned with beliefs in the Diaspora Nationalist movement. When he returned to Vitebsk he became involved in the then rising Zionist movement. He was inspired by the vision of the Jewish colonies and a Jewish peasantry, but the religious character of that Zionism did not appeal to him. He sought to publish a magazine to propagandize "his idea"—a synthesis of Jewish nationalism and socialism. At first, his father was willing to finance this enterprise, but was talked out of it by an ardent Zionist friend.

In 1885, Zhitlowsky tried to found a Jewish section of the illegal Narodnya Volya party, but those in the central committee of the Narodnya Volya who believed in cosmopolitanism and assimilation defeated the Zhitlowsky project. This was a severe blow for the young Jewish revolutionary. His grandfather consoled him, pointing out the revolutionary character of the prophets, and of the great Jewish intellects of the later times. This quickened Zhitlowsky's interest in Jewish history. He soon established contact with a St. Petersburg group of the Narodnaya Volya.

His first work, a treatise in Russian entitled Thought of the Historical Fate of the Jewish People was published in Moscow in 1887 when he was twenty-two. (Shortly before that he had been banished by the police from St. Petersburg). The liberal Russian press enthusiastically greeted and responded warmly to his ideas, but was met with scant favour among Jewish critics, because it contained no solution to the problems it treated. Several suspected him of being a Christian missionary.

Zhitlowsky returned to Vitebsk for a short time, from there he went to Galicia, where it was much easier to preach Socialist doctrines among the Jewish masses. He became acquainted with a group of Jewish revolutionists from Zurich, who were engaged in disseminating radical literature in Yiddish.

He went to Berlin in 1888 and resumed his study of Jewish history, Marxism and philosophy. He was expelled from Germany under the anti-Socialist law, and moved to Zurich. He immediately became active, founding the non-partisan "Verein für Wissenschaft und Leben des Jüdischen Volkes," (Association for Science and Life of the Jewish People) for the purpose of inculcating nationalism and socialism among the Jewish masses. He engaged in debates between the orthodox and the adherents of the Narodnaya Volya. The latter evolved into the Social Revolutionary Party. He moved to Bern to study, earning his doctorate in 1892. Here, too, he founded an organization similar to the one in Zurich.

When famine broke out in Russia in 1891, he and Charles Rappaport founded a non-partisan organization to help the afflicted. The work was unsuccessful due to political differences between members.

The London newspaper Freie Welt (Free World) published his translation of two revolutionary poems. In 1892, The London Fund for Revolutionary Publication printed his Russian tract A Jew to Jews (Еврей к евреям), under the pseudonym of I. Khisin. In his first socialist pamphlet on a Jewish theme, he demanded national as well as civil equality for Jews, articulating his ideas on Judaism in Europe. He was also active in an organization which combated the "Society for the Prevention of Cruelty to Animals," which caused controversy and was deemed anti-Semitic for calling Shechita (kosher slaughter of animals) animal cruelty.

Toward the latter part of 1893, Zhitlowsky, now a Ph.D., aided by Shloyme Rappaport, M. Rosenbaum and several other Russian radicals, founded the Federation of Russian Socialist Revolutionaries Abroad from which later developed the Socialist Revolutionary Party. The group opposed dogmatic Marxism. The newspaper The Russian Worker, appearing under Zhitlowsky's and Rappaport's editorship, spread propaganda among the masses. In 1898 the Verband published Zhitlowsky's theoretical work, Socialism and the Fight for Political Freedom, written under the pen name Gregorovich. In this work, he tried to synthesize the three principal currents of the Russian revolutionary movement. From time to time, he contributed to several well-known Russian magazines, such as Russkoye Bogatstvo (Russian Wealth); articles on Marxism and philosophy in the Jewish—Russian Voskhod; and contributed also to Sozialistische Monatshefte (Socialist Monthly) and Deutsche Worte (German Words).

In 1896, he organized the Group of Jewish Socialists Abroad, the purpose of which was to prepare revolutionary propaganda literature in Yiddish, with the Communist Manifesto as a beginning. For this revolutionary library, Zhitlowsky wrote an introduction entitled Yiddish—Why?. The Bund which published the booklet thought that Zhitlowsky's introduction was not sufficiently revolutionary and too nationalistic, because the author expressed the belief that the rebirth of the Yiddish language and literature would lead to the national and social awakening of the Jewish people. {{Citation needed|reason=lack of citations for last 2 paragraphs date=November 14 2022}}

Zhitlowsky attended the First Zionist Congress meeting at Basel in 1897. He was against founding a Zionist party, and believed in the necessity for a League for Jewish Colonization, a league that would appeal to all those opposed to Herzel's political Zionism. A day after the Congress, Zhitlowsky addressed the delegates and guests on Yiddish and the purposes of the Yiddish publishing house Zeit Geist, which had been founded by a group of Jewish intellectuals and revolutionaries. In this speech were first laid the foundations of Yiddishism, which subsequently became deeply rooted in Eastern Europe and America. He came into close relations with the Bund which published his pamphlet Zionism or Socialism? in 1898.

In 1900, Zhitlowsky and John Edelheim founded the Deutscher Academischer Soziale Wissenschafte (German Academy of Social Science). They also took over the magazine Sozialistische Monatshefte (Socialist Monthly).

He toured important European centres, making connections with revolutionary leaders of England, France, and Germany. The Deutscher Academischer Varlag existed several years. It was often attacked by orthodox Marxists because of the "revisionist" works published by him.

=== Territorialism ===
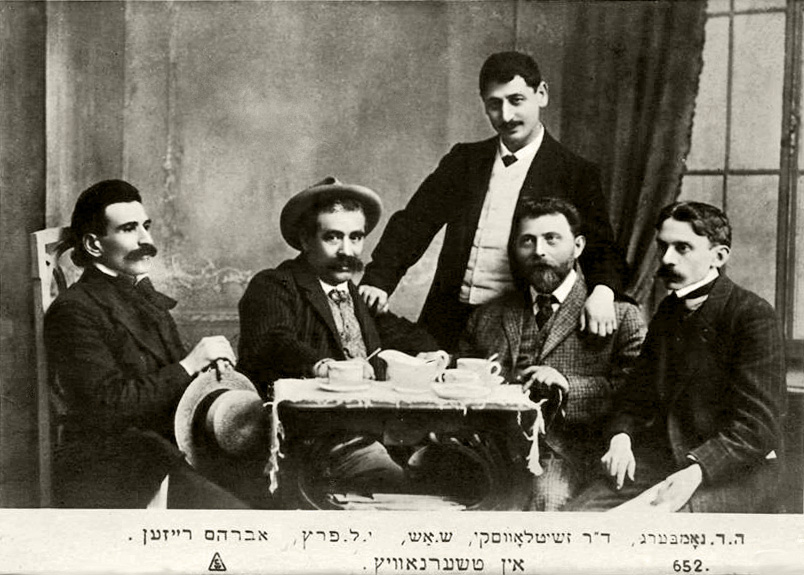
Czernowitz Conference, 1908. Right to left: Hersh Dovid Nomberg, Chaim Zhitlovsky, Scholem Asch, Isaac Leib Peretz, Avrom Reyzen

After the Kishinev pogrom of 1903 Zhitlowsky turned toward the territorialistic movement. He conceived the idea of a Jewish Sejm (parliament). At his initiative a group of radical nationalists and Zionists organized the Jewish Socialist Workers Party (commonly called the Sejmist party). In 1904, Zhitlowsky served as delegate at the International Socialist Congress in Amsterdam, and his fight that the Socialist Revolutionary Party should have a representative in the International Socialist Bureau ended victoriously.

When the first Yiddish daily in Russia, the St. Petersburg Frajnd, was founded, Zhitlowsky, under the pen name N. Gaydaroff, contributed a series of articles entitled The Jewish People and the Yiddish Language.

In 1904 Zhitlowsky and "Babushka" (Granny) Breshkovskaya were sent by the Socialist Revolutionary Party to America to collect funds for the party and carry on a propaganda of its ideas.

With the Party's permission, he gave lectures on various Jewish matters during his stay in America. At that time the Jewish radical intelligentsia in America was under the influence of socialist cosmopolitanism, which did not engage sympathetically with Jewish national problems, or the Yiddish language and culture. When Zhitlowsky in a series of lectures pointed out that there was no contradiction between progressive nationalism and the socialist ideal, he encountered strong opposition. Very soon, however, many of his erstwhile opponents turned into his most ardent partisans.

After a two-year sojourn in America, he returned to Europe. He spent some time in Galicia and then went to Russia, where his native governorate, Vitebsk, nominated him for the 1906 Russian legislative election. The government refused to allow him to take his seat in the Duma when elected. The reversal of this decision by the Senate came too late, for the Tsar had dissolved the Duma after only 73 days of session.

Zhitlowsky spent 1907 in Finland. With the aid of Gregory Gershuni, he engaged in a strong Socialist Revolutionary propaganda. He called a congress of socialist factions which leaned more closely to the Socialist Revolutionary ideology. This congress adopted several of his resolutions which increased the influence of the Sejmists (Parliamentarians). The Socialist Revolutionaries and the Sejmists sent him as their delegate to the International Socialist Congress at Stuttgart that year. Here he fought for the rights of these two parties in the International Socialist Bureau.

In 1908 he was sent to America by the Socialist Revolutionaries and the Sejmists, settling in New York. With the help of the following he had attracted among the radical Jewish intellectuals during his previous visit, Zhitlowsky founded a publishing house that issued a new monthly, Dos Naye Leben (The New Life). Under his editorship, the journal exercised great influence on Yiddish culture, including the development of free socialist thought, and became an organ of modern Yiddish literature; for the six years it existed (until 1914), Dos Naye Leben was a spiritual home of many Jewish publicists and scientists.

Zhitlowsky returned to Europe in 1908, where he participated in the Czernowitz Yiddish Language Conference. Under the leadership of its originators, Zhitlowsky, J. L. Perez and Nathan Birnbaum, the Conference for the first time declared Yiddish to be "a national language of the Jewish people." He returned to the United States after the conference to continue his activities in organizing secular Yiddish education.

=== Yiddish education ===
In 1909 Zhitlowsky raised (in his magazine Dos Naye Leben) the question of founding Yiddish secular schools in America.

In 1910 at the Convention of the Poale Zion Party in Montreal, Canada, that matter was placed by him on the order of the day, and there and then the inauguration of this type of school was proclaimed. The first Folkshul (people's school) in New York City was opened on 10 December 1910 at 143 Madison St., and Zhitlowsky took an active part in the growth of the school.

His influence was also very considerable in the creation, some years later, of the Jewish secular schools of the Workmen's Circle, despite the opposition of Abe Cahan, editor of The Jewish Daily Forward who advocated assimilation of Jewish workers into the general working class.

=== Later years ===
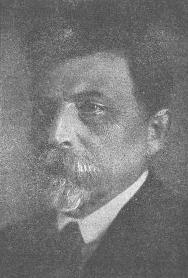
Zhitlowsky in an undated portrait

In 1912, thousands of Zhitlowsky's followers celebrated the 25th anniversary of his literary activity. Four volumes of his collected works, shortly followed by two others, were published in connection with this anniversary.

In 1913 publication of Dos Naye Leben ceased, and Zhitlowsky made a lecture tour of Jewish student colonies of the important academic centers in France, Belgium, Germany, Austria, and Switzerland. He also visited Palestine in order to study the possibilities of widespread Jewish colonization there.

He returned to America at the outbreak of the World War I. Until then he had been a contributor to the Warheit (Truth), edited by L. A. Miller. He now joined the staff of the newly organized Day. He advocated for America's neutrality, and battled against the pro-German feelings of the man in the street and of the Yiddish press.

Zhitlowsky also joined the movement for a Jewish congress and when it was convened he played an important part in its deliberations. At the same time, he continued his tracts on philosophy and sociology in the Yiddish magazine Zukunft (Future).

In 1920, publication commenced of Die Zeit (The Times), a daily of the Poale Zion party, a party that Zhitlowsky had joined a few years before, and he became one of its major contributors. When the publication ceased in 1921, Zhitlowsky became a contributor of Der Tog (The Day).

In 1922, Zhitlowsky and Shmuel Niger renewed the publication of Dos Naye Leben. Its point of view remained unaltered. In 1923, when the magazine was discontinued, Zhitlowsky returned to Europe to complete The Spiritual Struggle of the Jewish People for Freedom. He visited Palestine and toured the Jewish centers in Poland, Lithuania, and Latvia between 1924 and 1925.

On 28 November 1925, Zhitlowsky's 60th birthday was celebrated at the Manhattan Opera House in New York. Similar celebrations were held in other American and European cities visited by Zhitlowsky. A Zhitlowsky memorial volume was published in Berlin containing articles and reminiscences of his intimate friends and disciples. At Zhitlowsky's suggestion, the proceeds from the book were given to the Yiddish Scientific Institute (YIVO) of Vilno, which Albert Einstein, Sigmund Freud, as well as Zhitlowsky, were members of its Honorary Board of Directors.

Through his and S. Ellsberg's initiative, the Yiddish Culture Society was founded in September 1929. The purpose of the organization was to unite all adherents of Yiddish to enable them to work in common for the development of Yiddish, the Yiddish school, and Yiddish culture in general. He was also one of the editors of the weekly Yiddish, issued by the Yiddish Culture Society.

When the Jewish-American Congress decided to resume activity on a democratic basis, Zhitlowsky at once engaged in its labours. He was one of the leaders of the Worker's Bloc, and supported the calling of a Jewish World Congress.

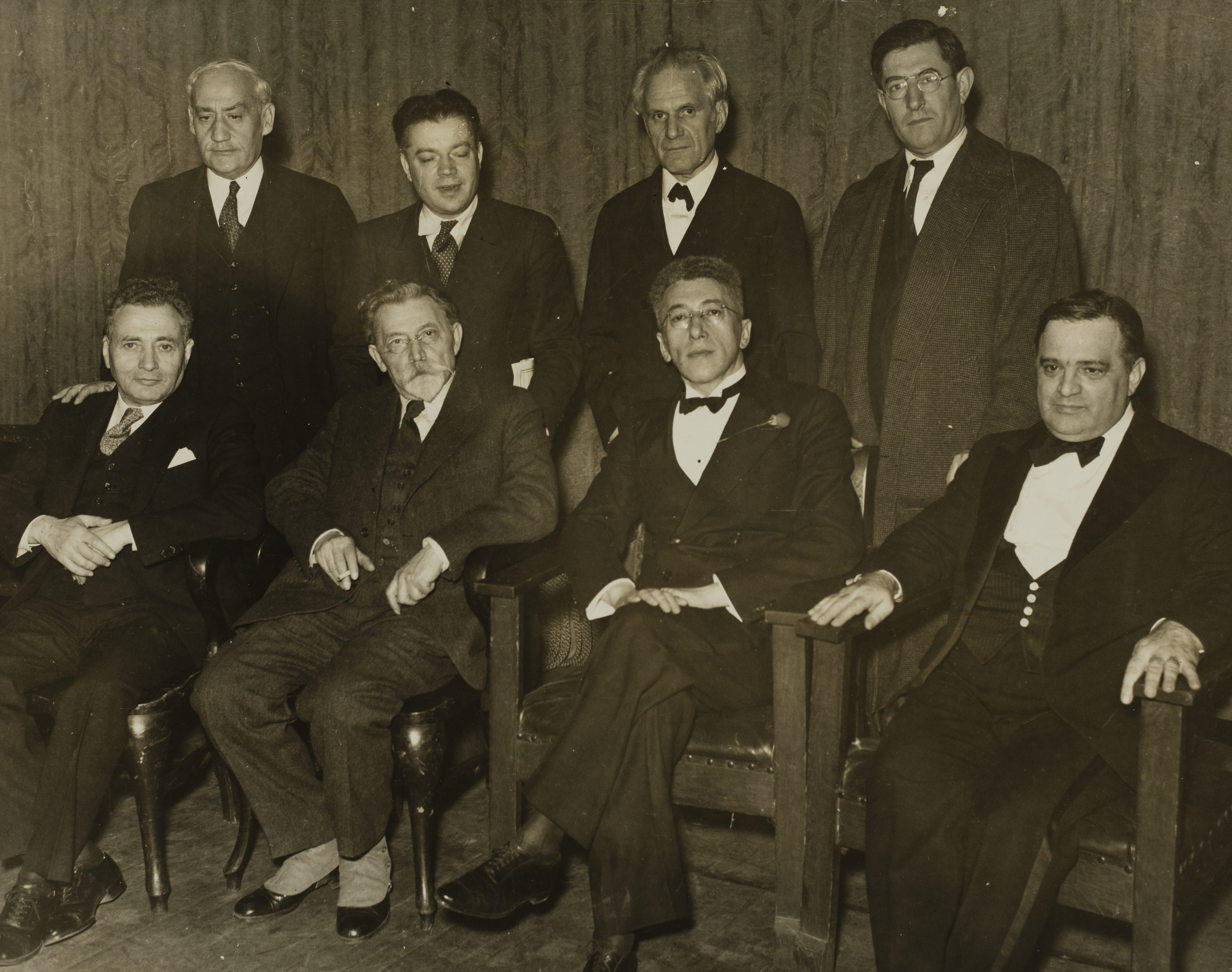
Zhitlowsky and several other prominent New York politicos c. 1938. Seated (L-R): Joseph Weinberg, Dr. Chaim Zhitlowsky, Baruch Charney Vladeck, and Fiorello LaGuardia. Standing: Joseph Baskin, David Dubinsky, Judge Jacob Panken, and Judge Charles Solomon.

From 1936 until his death in 1943, he aligned with radical, pro-Soviet areas of the Jewish community such as the IWO (International Workers Order), the IKUF (Yidisher Kultur Farband -Yiddish Culture Society), and the ICOR (Association for Jewish Colonization in Soviet Union).

Other writings of Zhitlowsky include:

- Philosophy (published in 1910), the first Yiddish book to deal with the development of philosophic thought;
- a Yiddish translation of Friedrich Nietzsche's Also Sprach Zarathustra;
- an essay on Einstein's Theory of Relativity (published in Warsaw in 1930);
- two lectures on Science, Philosophy and Religion (published in 1931).

=== Death ===
Zhitlowsky died in Calgary, Canada, on May 6, 1943 while visiting on a lecture circuit. His funeral was held at the Manhattan Center on 34th Street in New York, NY.

== Key achievements ==
In his monograph, Zhitlowsky; His Life and Work, Shmuel Niger made the following summary of Zhitlowsky's achievements:

In the world of universal ideas:

- Fought against dogmatism in philosophy in general, and in the philosophy of dialectical materialism, in particular.
- Strove to unite all elements of labor, factory workers, peasants, intellectual workers—in the struggle for socialism.
- Fought for the principles of autonomy and federalism as against centralization in the State.
- Theoretic and practical propaganda of Socialist Revolutionary ideas.

In the Jewish world:

- Fought for the secularization and separation of nationality from religion.
- Fought for progressive national culture, against assimilation and narrow nationalism.
- Theoretic proof of Galuth-nationalism.
- Synthesis of nationalism arid socialism, of Galuth-nationalism and territorialism.
- Influenced the programs of the Jewish nationalist parties.
- Interested radical Jewish intelligentsia in Yiddish cultural life and work.
- Helped to clarify and crystallize the Yiddish radical movement in America.
- Enriched Yiddish language and oratory. Propagated the idea of the new secular Yiddish school.
- Pioneer work in the field of scientific and philosophical literature in Yiddish.

This is a short summary of over a half of century of scientific, literary, journalistic work, and activity as a lecturer and publisher, all in the spirit of socialism and progressive nationalism among the Jewish masses in America and abroad.

== Other information ==
In Yidn un Yiddishkayt (Jews and Jewishness, 1924), he sought to define the secular essence of Yiddishkeit, this time by calling forth the notions of racial contemporary theories.

== Selected publications ==
- Gedanken über die geschichtlichen Schicksale der Juden, 1887 (in Russian)
- Der Traum fun a Lediggeher, London 1891
- Sozialismus und Kämpfe für politische Freiheit, 1898
- Das jüdische Volk und die jüdische Sprache, 1903
- Der Sozialismus und die nationale Frage, 1907 (in Yiddish)
- Die Philosophie, was sie ist und wie sie sich entwickelt hat, 2 vols. New York 1910, in Yiddish, 2. Aufl. 1920

== Sources ==
- "Zionism or Socialism" By Chaim Zhitlovsky.
- "Our Language Question" By Chaim Zhitlovsky
- "The Future of Our Youth In This Country and Assimilation" (English Translation) By Chaim Zhitlovsky.
- "Kant's Critical Philosophy" excerpt from "Philosophy" By Chaim Zhitlovsky.
- "Hobbes and Locke" excerpt from "Philosophy" by Chaim Zhitlovsky.
- "Plato and Aristotle" excerpt from "Philosophy" by Chiam Zhitlovsky
- "A Short Biography of His Life and Works"
- "The Assimilation" By Chaim Zhitlovsky

== Bibliography ==
- Melech Epstein, Profiles of Eleven. Detroit, MI: Wayne State University Press, 1965.
- Zhitlowsky, Chaim, Collected Works. 1912 Gezamelte Shriften / Hayim Zshitlovski. Yubileum Oysgabe, V 1–4 Edition. New York: c1912-1919. 10 v, 21 cm. / 1641 (v. 1–10). (in Yiddish)
- Kogel, Renee and Katz, Zev, eds. Judaism in a Secular Age, Intl. Institute for Secular Humanistic Judaism, 1995., pp. 90–95 (excerpts from his essays "Death and Rebirth of Gods and Religion," "The National Poetic Rebirth of the Jewish People").
- Max Rosenfeld in Jewish Currents Reader, Jewish Currents, Inc. 1996, "Zhitlovsky: Philosopher of Jewish Secularism (essay)."
- Lucy S. Dawidowicz, ed. The Golden Tradition, Beacon Press, 1967, pp. 411–422, "The Jewish Factor in My Socialism" (essay by Zhitlovsky).
- Joseph Leftwich comp. and trans., The Way We Think, A. S. Barnes & Co., 1969. pp. 76–98, Zhitlovski essays: "Job-A Poem of Jewish Free Thought," "What Is Secular Jewish Culture?"
- Kay Schweigmann-Greve, Die Überführung der religiösen jüdischen Tradition in Poesie und säkulare jüdische Nationalkultur bei Chaim Zhitlowsky. In: Randfiguren, Festschrift für Manfred Walther. Hannover 2005, Seite 65–101 (in German).
- Kay Schweigmann-Greve, Jüdische Nationalität aus verweigerter Assimilation. Biographische Parallelen bei Moses Hess und Chajm Zhitlowsky und ihre ideologische Verarbeitung. In: Trumah, Journal of the Hochschule for Jewish Studies Heidelberg, Vol 17, 2007 p. 91–116 (in German).
