= Avrom Reyzen =

Yiddish writer, including poetry (1876–1953)

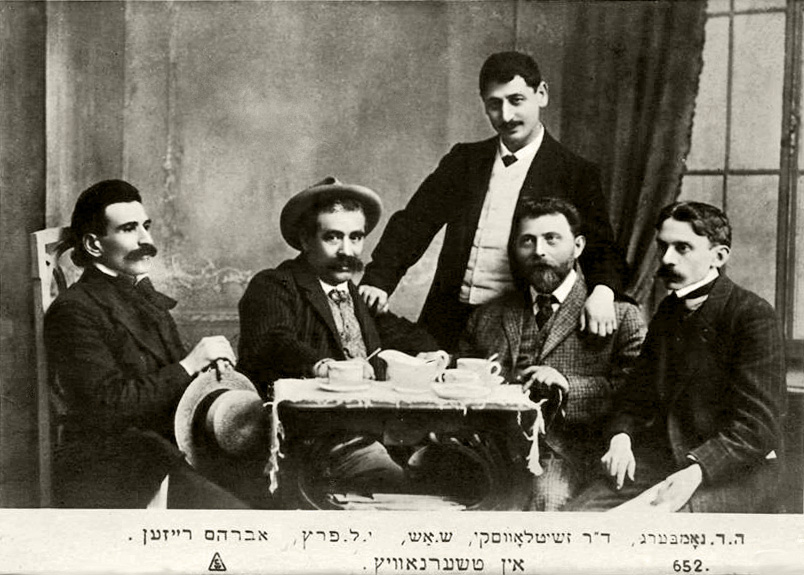
- Hersh Dovid Nomberg, Chaim Zhitlovsky, Scholem Asch, Isaac Leib Peretz, Avrom Reyzen during the Czernowitz Conference (also known as the Conference for the Yiddish Language) (1908).
- Born: Avrom Reyzen; April 8, 1876; Koidanov, Belarus
- Died: April 2, 1953 (aged 76); New York City, New York, U.S.
- Other names: Abraham Reisen; M. Vilner
- Occupations: Yiddish writer (including autobiography, poetry, short stories), editor

Avrom Reyzen (Yiddish: אַבֿרהם רייזען; April 8, 1876 – April 2, 1953), known as Abraham Reisen, was a Belorussian Jewish-American editor and writer, including autobiography, poetry and short stories. He was the elder brother of the Yiddishist Zalman Reisen.

== Life ==
Reyzen was born in Koidanov (Minsk Governorate, eastern Belarus). Supported by Yaknehoz (pseudonym of Yeshaye Nisn Hakoyen Goldberg), while in his early teens Reyzen sent articles to Dos Yudishes folks-blat in Saint Petersburg.

He corresponded with Jacob Dinezon and I. L. Peretz. In 1891, they published Reyzen's poem Ven dos lebn is farbitert ("When Life Is Embittered") in their Di yudishe bibliotek (The Yiddish Library). His first story, A kapore der noz abi a goldener zeyger mit 300 rubl nadn ("Damn the Nose, As Long As There Is a Dowry of a Watch and 300 Rubles") was published in Vilna in 1892.

In 1895, he joined the Imperial Russian Army, serving in a musicians' unit until 1899.

In addition to writing for the Zionist Der yud, in 1900 Reyzen created the literary anthology Dos tsvantsikste yorhundert (The Twentieth Century) which includes work by I. L. Peretz, Hersh Dovid Nomberg, David Pinski, and others. A believer in the socialist ideology, Reyzen wrote for the General Jewish Labour Bund (a secular Jewish socialist party), sometimes under the pseudonym M. Vilner, during the late 19th and early 20th centuries.

In 1902, Reyzen published a poetry collection, Tsayt lider (Poems of the Time), and in 1903, issued a book of stories, Ertseylungen un bilder (Stories and Scenes). He wrote for Der fraynd and Der tog in St Petersburg.

A founder (with his brother Zalman, Chaim Zhitlovsky, Peretz, and his close friends Scholem Asch and Hersh Dovid Nomberg) of Yiddishism, he took part in the Czernowitz Yiddish Language Conference of 1908 at which Yiddish was proclaimed a national language of the Jews.

In 1910, he began the Warsaw literary weekly Eyropeyishe literatur (European Literature) and another called Fraye erd (Free Land).

In early 1911, Reyzen moved to New York City and contributed to Forverts and Tsukunft. His Troyerike motivn gevidmet oreme layt (Sad Motifs Dedicated to the Poor) was published (at Sholem Aleichem's recommendation) in Philadelphia’s Shtot tsaytung. From 1929, he worked exclusively for Forverts, where he wrote a story each week, without a break. In 1935, he completed the three-volume autobiographical Epizodn fun mayn lebn (Episodes from My Life).

He became a U.S. citizen in the 1930s. He died in New York City in 1953.

Irving Howe wrote about Reyzen:

"The miracle of a Reisen is not that he derives from the people but that he remains at harmony with them... Precisely because he regards being a Jew as a "natural" condition of life, beyond query or challenge, his poems and stories take his culture utterly for granted: they neither explain nor justify"

At his death in 1953, Reyzen was eulogized:

"There are many Yiddish writers who owe their success to Reisen's encouragement. For years he published and edited, under great sacrifices, Yiddish journals with the primary aim of providing a platform for young, struggling writers... He had no arrogance, no pretensions and no personal vanity."
