= Matthias Mieses =

Polish Jewish historian and linguist (1885–1945)

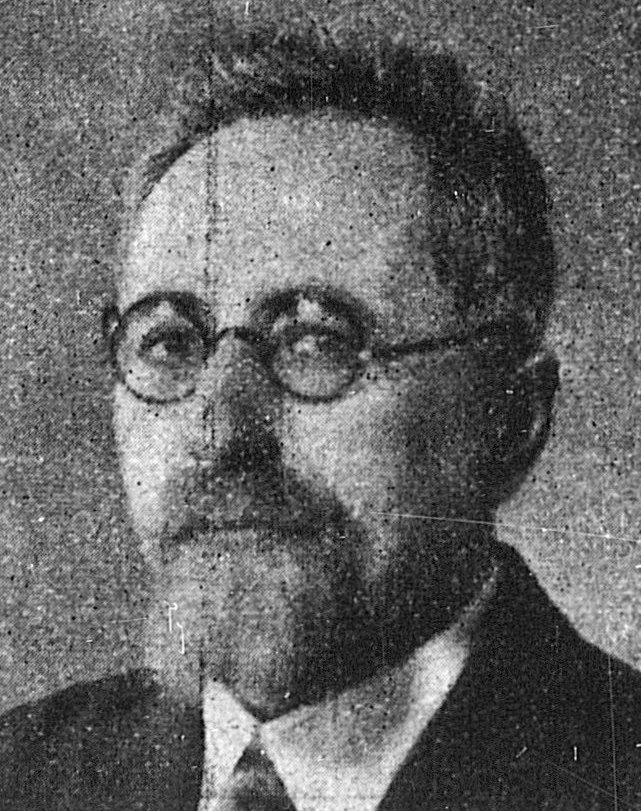
- Mieses in 1933
- Born: Mateusz Mieses; June 30, 1885; Przemyśl, Austria-Hungary
- Died: January 18, 1945 (aged 59); Gleiwitz, Poland
- Occupations: historian; linguist

Matthias Mieses (June 30, 1885 – January 18, 1945) was a Polish Jewish historian and linguist of Yiddish culture, particularly philology.

== Biography ==
Mieses was born in Przemyśl, Austria-Hungary (now Poland) to a family involved in the Haskalah movement. He published a Hebrew poem in HaMagid at age 15, and had studied ten languages by age 18.

He mainly wrote in Hebrew, German, and Polish, including hundred of articles in science and politics, but had a strong interest in Yiddish. He studied the language extensively and advocated for Yiddish to be recognized as a European national language. He opposed the War of the Languages and felt there was no conflict between Hebrew and Yiddish. He defended Yiddish in Hebrew essays and articles, leading to a 1907 debate with Nahum Sokolow in the World Zionist Organization's Hebrew weekly, HaOlam, the Hebrew version of Die Welt. He defended Yiddish in a speech at the Czernowitz Conference in 1908, which was praised by I. L. Peretz.

He wrote several books, mainly about Jewish history in Poland, including a two volume biographical encyclopedia of Christian Poles who had Jewish descent, which gained much praise and criticism.

His Die Gesetze der Schriftgeschichte is the first major effort to compile case studies supporting the notion that came to be expressed in English as "Script follows religion."

He was in Przemyśl when World War II began, and planned to publish an encyclopedia of religion despite the Nazi occupation. He was moved to the Przemyśl Ghetto, until it was liquidated in September 1943, and he was deported first to the Szebnie concentration camp, then the Kraków-Płaszów concentration camp in February 1944, where he worked to catalog books stolen from Jewish libraries. He died of exhaustion near Gliwice on 18 January 1945, during a death march to Auschwitz concentration camp.

== Works ==
- Ha-Polanim veha-Yehudim (Hebrew: The Poles and the Jews, 1905)
- Ha-‘Amim ha-‘atikim ve-Yisra’el (Hebrew: The Ancient Nations and Israel, 1909)
- Die Entstehungsursache der jüdischen Dialekte (German: The Reasons for the Emergence of Jewish Dialects, 1915)
- Die Gesetze der Schriftgeschichte. Konfession und Schrift im Leben der Völker, (German: The Laws of the History of Writing. Confession and Script in the Life of Peoples, 1919)
- Zur Rassenfrage (German: Concerning the Issue of Race, 1919)
- Der Ursprung des Judenhasses (German: The Origin of Jew-Hatred, 1923)
- Die jiddische Sprache (German: The Yiddish Language, 1924)
- Żydzi jako rolnicy w dawnej Polsce (Polish: Jews as Farmers in Polish History, 1938)
- Polacy-chrześcijanie pochodzenia żydowskiego (Polish: Christian Poles of Jewish Origin, 1938)
