= Jacob Dinezon =

Russian Jewish novelist (1851-1919)

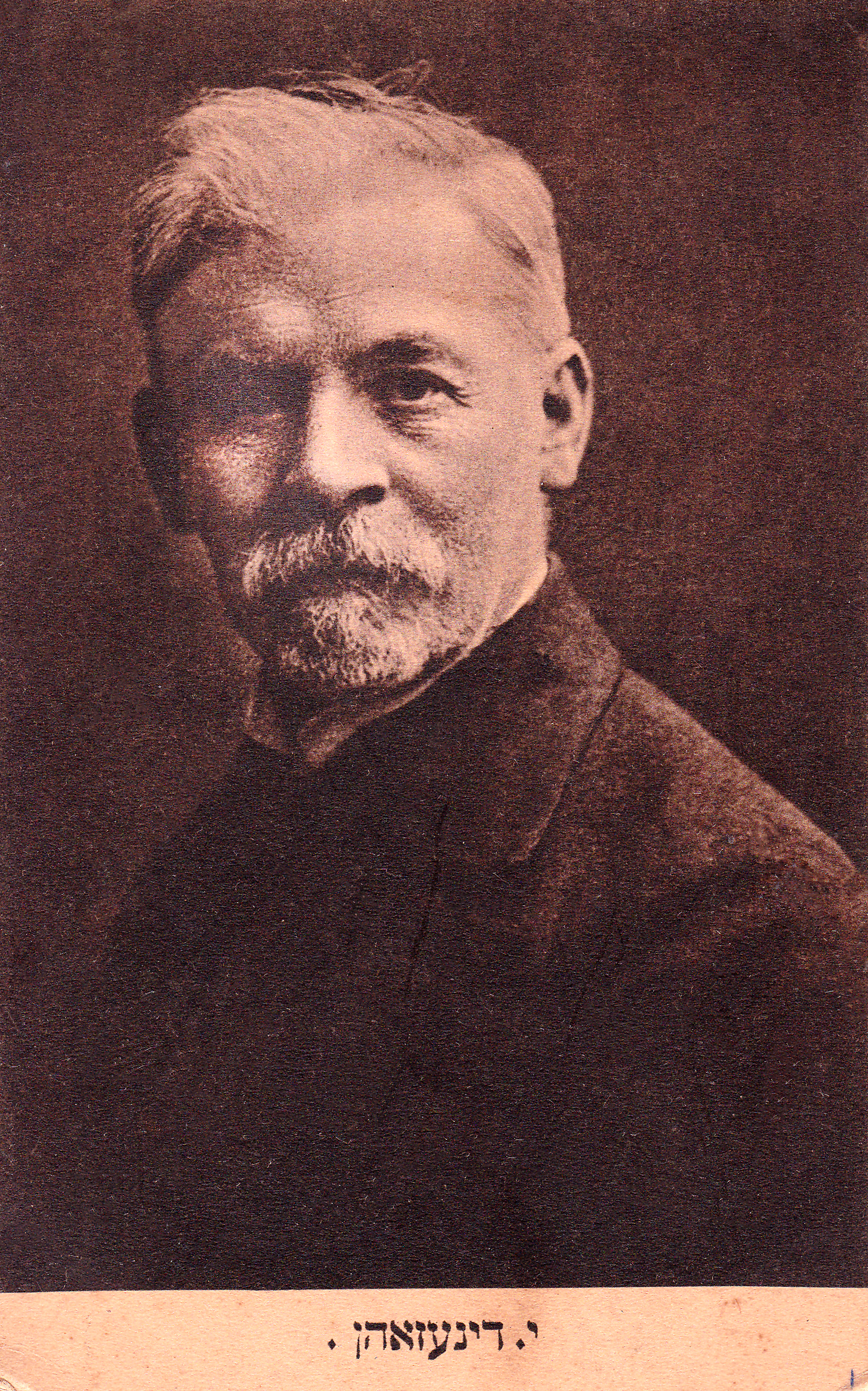
- Dinezon, late 19th century
- Born: c. 1851 (uncertain); Nay Zhager (New Zhager), Kovno Governorate, Russian Empire
- Died: August 29, 1919 (aged 68); Warsaw, Poland
- Occupation: Writer
- Writing career
- Period: 19th century
- Genres: Yiddish novels, short stories
- Literary movement: Yiddish realism, Haskalah
- Website: www.jacobdinezon.com

Jacob Dinezon, also known as Yankev Dinezon (c. 1851 – 1919), was a Yiddish author and editor from Lithuania (then part of the Russian Empire). There are various spellings of Dinezon's name in both Yiddish and English transliteration. Early in his career, Yiddish publications spelled his name דינעזאהן (Dinezohn). Later publications removed the ה and spelled his name דינעזאן or דינעזאָן (Dinezon). In English, his name has been spelled Dienesohn, Dinesen, Dineson, Dinezon, Dinesohn, Dineszohn, Dinezohn, Dynesohn, and Dynezon.

Most of his career was dedicated to promoting the literary status of the Yiddish language, supporting and collaborating in the creation of early Yiddish prose, poetry, journals, and anthologies. He was part of an active group of Yiddish authors, including his colleagues and friends I. L. Peretz, Sholem Aleichem, and Mendele Mocher Sforim, considered the classic writers of modern Yiddish literature.

He is credited as the author of the first bestselling novel in Yiddish and the first realistic Jewish romance. During his lifetime, he wrote several novels and short stories about Jewish life in the Russian Empire with scenes from urban environments as well as from shtetl life. Dinezon was a keen observer of the social changes spreading throughout Jewish communities in his time. His stories often depicted the emotional conflicts arising from the encounter between traditional religious and social norms and the modern ideas of Jewish Enlightenment.

== Biography ==
Jacob Dinezon was born in Nay Zhager (New Zhager) near Kovno in Lithuania. The exact year of his birth is uncertain - various bibliographical entries suggest 1856, 1852, or 1851. A newspaper article published on the occasion of his death in August 1919 (in the Yiddish newspaper Haynt - Today) reports that Dinezon was 68 years old when he died, which suggests the year of his birth was 1851, and data from a census conducted in Žagarė seems to confirm the same date.

He grew up in a relatively well-to-do household with his parents, Pesya and Benjamin, two older sisters, one younger sister, and a brother (who died in his early childhood). His father died in 1866, when Dinezon was about 12. He was then raised by his uncle in Mohilev, where he attended a yeshiva until age 16. In addition to a traditional Jewish education, he was exposed to the new ideas of the Haskalah (Jewish Enlightenment), which encouraged Jews to become educated in secular disciplines and languages. He had the chance to study Russian, German, and disciplines such as mathematics, history, and science.

In Dinezon's time, Yiddish was the everyday language of most Jewish communities in central and Eastern Europe. However, there was barely any literature available in Yiddish, as it was considered a lowly, poorly developed language unfit for literary works. Even within the Jewish community, it was often referred to as jargon (זשאַרגאָן, zhargon), in a demeaning manner. Hebrew, on the contrary, enjoyed a very high status, even though it was a language that was virtually never spoken except for religious events or occasional expressions. Starting from the late 18th century, however, the Haskalah movement had started promoting a revival of Hebrew, working on the development of a modern Hebrew language for the production and circulation of Jewish culture. Dinezon supported the development of the new Hebrew language, but despite his Enlightenment-oriented education, he also developed an interest in Yiddish as a medium of culture and literature.

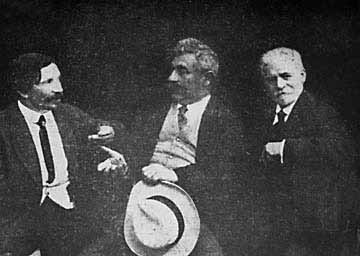
Dinezon (right), before 1919, with Yiddish authors Peretz (center) and Sholem Aleichem (left)

In 1868, Dinezon was employed as a Hebrew tutor in a prominent family in Mohilev named Horowitz (or Hurevitsh, according to some sources) which gave him the opportunity to further his secular education. It was in this period that he started publishing articles in Hebrew, contributing to Hebrew newspapers as well as scientific education brochures. He eventually also became a trusted advisor, business agent, and estate manager for the Horowitz family. Around 1875, thanks to the Horowitz family, he was introduced to the owners of the renowned Widow and Brothers Romm Printing House, one of Europe's most prominent Yiddish and Hebrew publishing houses in the 19th and 20th centuries.

With the encouragement of the established Yiddish author Ayzik Meyer Dik, who had befriended Dinezon on one of his visits to Vilna, Romm agreed to publish Dinezon's novel, ha-Ne’ehavim veha-neimim, oder, Der shvartser yungermanṭshik (The Beloved and Pleasing, or, The Dark Young Man), which was printed in 1877. The first edition sold out quickly, and even Dinezon had difficulty obtaining a copy.

The success of The Dark Young Man, however, did not receive the acceptance that Dinezon desired from the members of the Jewish Enlightenment world whom he had hoped to impress, because he had written the novel in Yiddish instead of Hebrew. Further, as he told the literary critic Shmuel Niger, his novel produced an outpouring of poor-quality, imitative works that embarrassed him. Dinezon wrote, “I couldn’t stop writing, but it didn’t cost me effort or mental strain not to publish the finished works.”. Dinezon would not publish another literary work for several years.

Dinezon's return to publishing began after he met and befriended I. L. Peretz in 1889. In that year, Dinezon's Even negef, oder a shtein in veg (A Stumbling Block in the Road) was released.

Between 1899 and 1902, Dinezon published several stories and feuilletons in the Yiddish newspaper Der Yid (The Jew). In 1903, he contributed several stories, holiday tales, and his novella Alter to the Yiddish newspaper Der Fraynd (The Friend), which called itself, “The first zhargon (jargon) newspaper in Russia”. On May 15 of that year, the Yiddish critic Bal-Makhshoves wrote a tribute to Dinezon in celebration of his 25th writer's Jubilee. A month later, Dinezon's photograph was also published in Der fraynd.

The year 1904 was a prolific one for Dinezon whose stories, articles, and novellas appeared in the pages of Der fraynd alongside many of the major Yiddish authors of the period, including Mendele Mocher Sforim, I. L. Peretz, Sholem Aleichem, S. Ansky, Mordecai Spector, Sholem Asch, D. H. Nomberg, Abraham Reyzen, and the poet Shimen Frug. Dinezon's Falik un zayn hoyz (Falik and His House) and Der krizis (The Crisis) appeared in installments.

In 1906, in the aftermath of the failed Russian Revolution of January 1905, Dinezon turned down an offer from Johan Paley, editor of the New York Yiddish newspaper Yidishes Tageblatt (Jewish Daily News), to travel to America to conduct a speaking tour. In a letter that was translated into English and published in the Washington, D.C. The Sunday Star, Dinezon told Paley that he could not leave Warsaw while it was under siege by Russian Cossacks and while “the dark, uncertain condition of the Jews in Russia” prevailed. He concluded by writing, “My place is here with my people, come what may.”

Over the next few years, Dinezon's publishing output diminished, yet he remained actively engaged in Warsaw's literary community. In 1909, in celebration of Sholem Aleichem’s 25th Jubilee as a writer, Dinezon spearheaded a committee with Dr. Gershon Levine, Abraham Podlishevsky, and Noach Pryłucki to buy back the publishing rights to Sholem Aleichem’s works from various publishers for his sole use. At a time when Sholem Aleichem was ill and struggling financially, this proved to be a valuable gift, and Sholem Aleichem expressed his gratitude in a thank you letter in which he wrote,

“If I tried to tell you a hundredth part of the way I feel about you, I know that that would be sheer profanation. If I am fated to live a few years longer than I have been expecting, I shall doubtless be able to say that it’s your fault, yours and that of all the other friends who have done so much to carry out your idea of ‘the redemption of the imprisoned.’”

— Sholem Aleichem

By the end of the first decade of the 20th century, Dinezon ceased publishing altogether, although it is not clear why. The literary critic A. Mukdoni suggests that Dinezon’s close relationship with Peretz may have led to the demise of Dinezon’s writing career because Dinezon’s aspirations became subservient or merged with Peretz’s.

The outbreak of the First World War in 1914 forced Dinezon into a new role: community benefactor. As refugees poured into Warsaw from the war zone between Russia and Germany, Dinezon and I. L. Peretz helped found an orphanage and establish schools for displaced Jewish children.

The final five years of Dinezon’s life were filled with sadness and loss. In 1915, his closest friend and confidant, I. L. Peretz died of a heart attack in Warsaw. A year later, Sholem Aleichem passed away in New York City. In 1917, Mendele Mocher Sforim died in Odessa. Despite his grief, Dinezon worked tirelessly to care for Jewish children and became a vigorous advocate for the Yiddishist schools movement in Poland.

The educator and author C. S. Kasden wrote, “He often played with the children, entering their circle, taking them by the hand, and dancing with them. He remembered the child that was sad the day before, and if today the child was lively again, it was for him truly a celebration.”

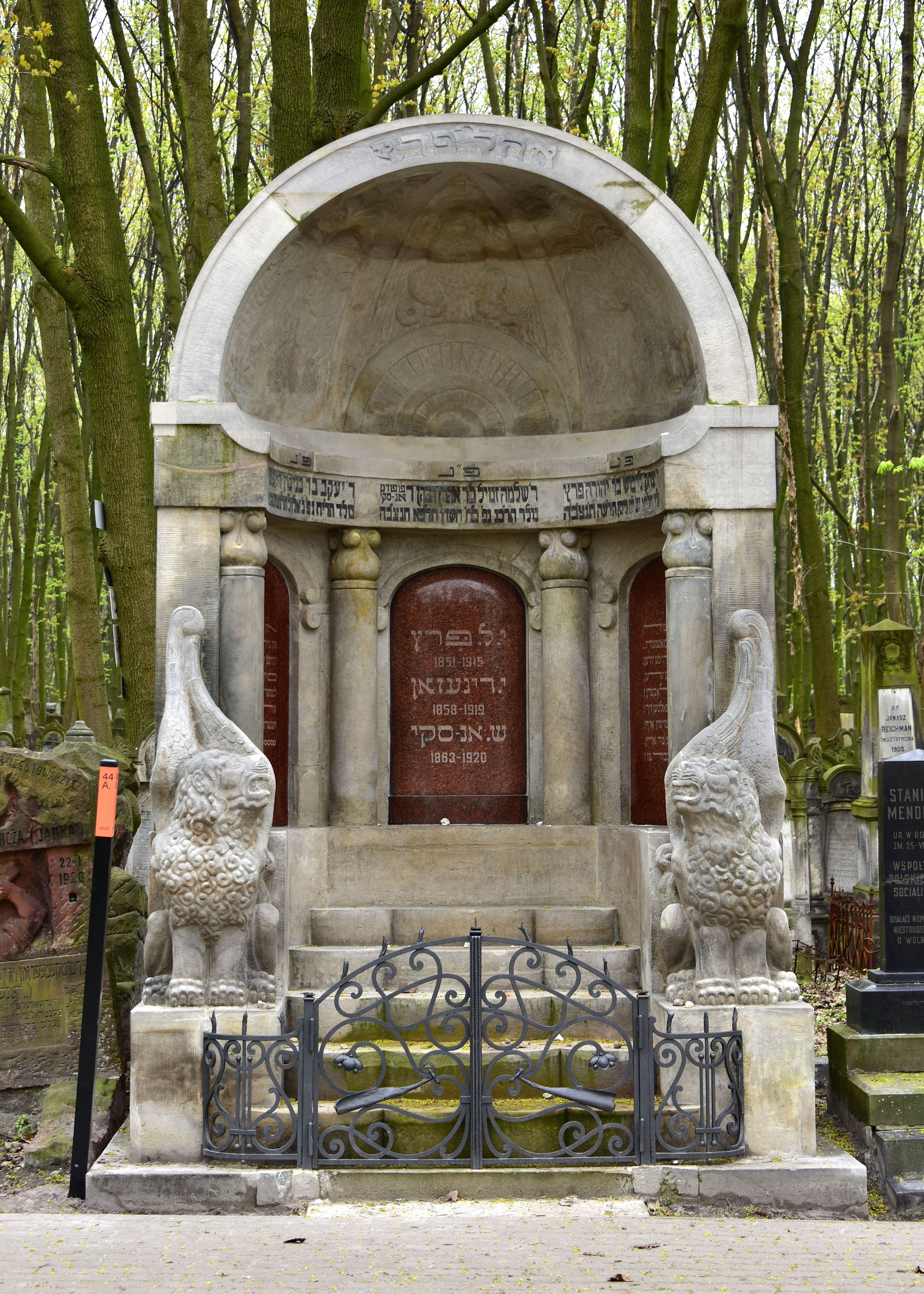
“Mauzoleum Trzech Pisarzy” (Mausoleum of the Three Writers), where Dinezon, I. L. Peretz, and S. An-sky are buried

Dinezon died on Friday, August 29, 1919 in his home at Karmelica 29 where he was surrounded by family and several members of the Warsaw literary community. The final hours of his life, his funeral procession to the cemetery, and the gravesite service were reported in detail in Warsaw's Yiddish newspaper Haynt (Today).

The Yiddish author and critic David Frishman wrote that tens of thousands of Jews from every ideology and faction lined the streets to mourn the loss of their beloved folk writer. In his eulogy for his friend, S. Ansky offered these words about Dinezon's character:

“He was always with those who suffered, for whom things were going badly, who needed something, who needed help. He gave away everything to them, he was not concerned about himself, he allowed nothing for himself. . . . Whenever you saw a smile on his face it was not about something done for him, but because he had given something to someone else. . . . Perhaps the most precious gift that God gave him, his talent, he also gave away. This is how much he was devoted to others and not himself.”

— S. An-sky

Honoring his last request, Dinezon was buried beside I. L. Peretz in the Jewish Cemetery on Okopowa Street. A year later, S. An-sky was also buried in the same plot following his death on November 8, 1920. In 1925, in honor of I. L. Peretz's 10th yahrzeit (the 10th anniversary of his death), a large granite mausoleum designed by Abraham Ostrzego was erected over their graves. Poles call the monument “Mauzoleum Trzech Pisarzy” (Mausoleum of the Three Writers). In Hebrew letters inscribed near the top are the words, “Ohel Peretz” (Peretz's Tomb).

== Legacy ==
Upon Dinezon's death, several unpublished manuscripts were discovered in his apartment. In honor of the 10th anniversary of Dinezon's death, a collection of his stories and novels was published in book form by Ahisefer Publishing in Warsaw. These included Alter, Even negef, oder, A shteyn in veg (Stumbling Block, or, A Stone in the Road), Falik in zayn hoyz (Falik in His House), Der krizis (The Crisis), ha-Ne’ehavim veha-neimim, oder, Der shvartser yungermanṭshik (The Beloved and Pleasing, or, The Dark Young Man), Hershele (Little Hershl), Yosele (Little Yosl), Tsvey mames (Two Mothers), and Zikhroynes un bilder: shtetl, kinderyorn, shrayber (Memories and Scenes: Shtetl, Childhood, Writers).

As Yiddish literature continued to advance during the interwar period, Dinezon's works fell out of favor with modern Jewish literati. However, the author, critic, and photographer Alter Kacyzne defended Dinezon's contributions to Yiddish literature in an essay, “The Problem, Dinezon,” published in Literarishe Bleter (Literary Pages) in 1924:

We had two true folk writers: Dinezon and Sholem Aleichem. No one imagines putting these two writers on the same plateau. Yet it is this way: in the main achievement of their artistry, they are comparable. Dinezon, the weeper, and Sholem Aleichem the clown. Both move us with the same theatrical method. Both wrinkle the face of the folk and force it to play along. The first—to weeping. The second—to laughter. Don’t discount the sentimentality of the art. Real sentimentality is just as warranted as real humor. Both methods are primitive ways to create an effect. If they emerge from an artist’s natural characteristic, then their effect is—art. And as this is the shortest way to an effect, it is folk-artistry.

— Alter Kacyzne

The Holocaust had a detrimental effect on Dinezon's literary reputation. His vast archive was lost, and the demise of Yiddish in the aftermath further diminished his legacy. In 1956, the Yiddish literary historian Shmuel Rozshanski tried to rectify this situation by publishing Yaakov Dinezon: Di mame tsvishn unzere klasikers (Jacob Dinezon: The Mother Among Our Classic Yiddish Writers). However, by the beginning of the 21st century none of Dinezon's seminal works had been translated into English.

This changed in 2014 when Memories and Scenes: Shtetl, Childhood, Writers was translated into English by Tina Lunson and published by Jewish Storyteller Press. Since that time, additional Dinezon books have been translated and published, including The Dark Young Man (trans. Tina Lunson, 2019), Yosele (trans. Jane Peppler, 2015), Hershele (trans. Jane Peppler, 2016), Alter (trans. Jane Peppler, 2014), and Falik and His House (trans. Mindy Liberman, 2021).

== List of works ==
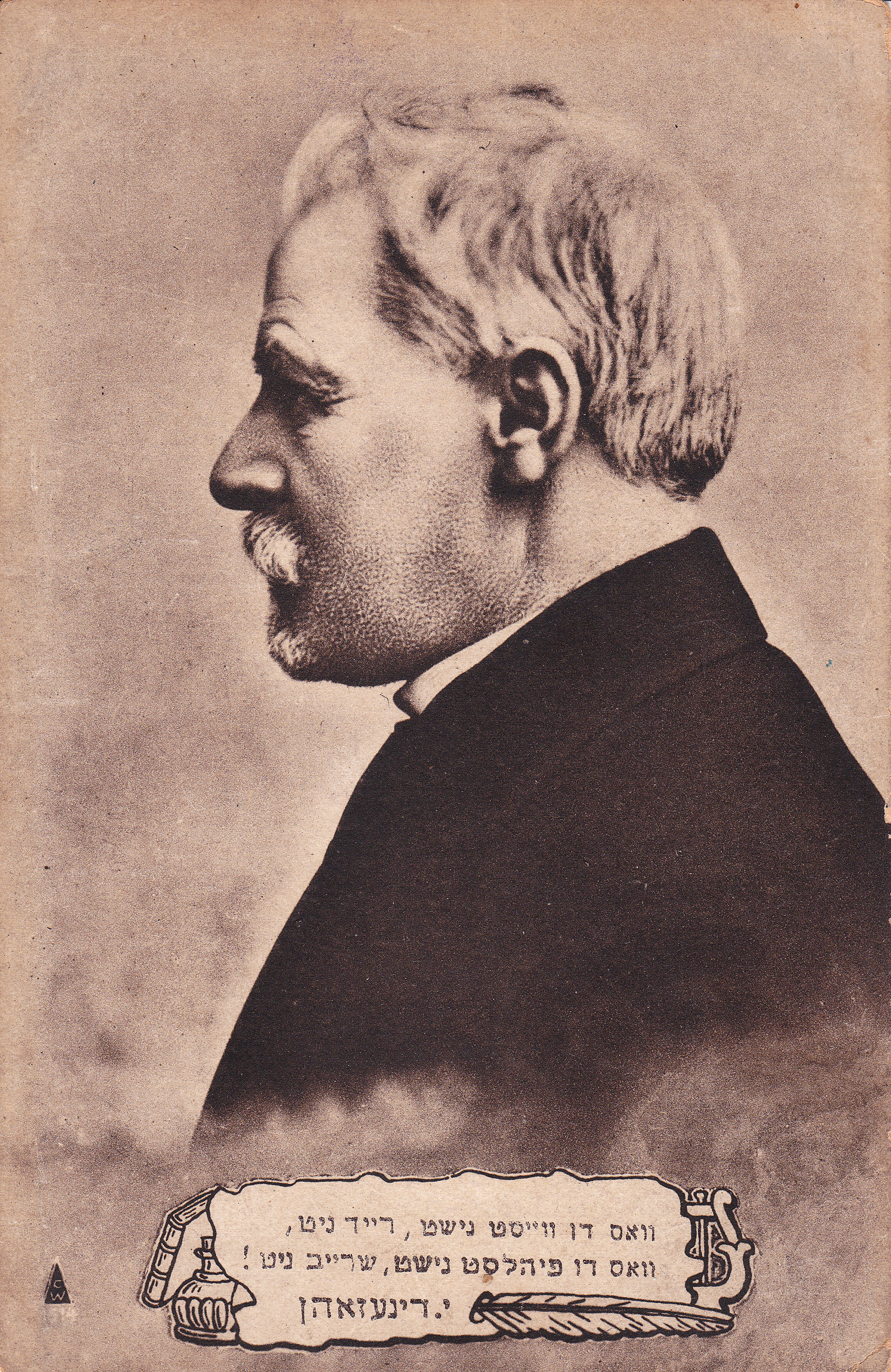
Dinezon on a 1918 postcard - "Don't talk about what you don't know, don't write about what you don't feel"

- 1877: Beoven avos (For the Sins of the Fathers). This novel was never published because it was blocked by censorship, perhaps due to pressure from the prominent family upon whom Dinezon based his novel.
- 1877: Ha-Ne’ehavim veha-ne‘imim, oder Der shvartser yunger-mantshik (The Beloved and the Pleasant, or the Black Young Man). This was Dinezon's first great success and it is considered the first bestselling novel in Yiddish and the first Jewish realistic romance as it sold over ten thousand copies shortly after its publication, and was reprinted multiple times.
- 1888: Kreplekh zolst du esn (Go Eat Kreplekh), a short story Dinezon wrote for Sholem Aleichem's literary almanac די ייִדיש פאָלק ביבליאָטעק Di Yidishe Folksbibliotek ("The Yiddish Popular Library").
- 1889: Even negef, oder a shtein in veg (A Stumbling Block in the Path), a novel published soon after the beginning of Dinezon's friendship with I. L. Peretz, who encouraged him to write in Yiddish again.
- 1891: Di yudishe bibliotek (The Jewish Library). This Yiddish literary journal was one of the first products of Dinezon's collaboration with Peretz.
- 1891: Hershele, a novel first published in Di yudishe bibliotek about a poor yeshiva boy who falls in love with the daughter of a wealthy merchant's widow.
- 1894-1896: Di yontef bletlekh (Holiday Pages), an irregularly published Yiddish anthology edited together with Peretz, Mordecai Spector, and David Pinski.
- 1899: Yosele, a novel about a mistreated heder boy that helped transform Jewish education at the turn of the twentieth century.
- 1903: Alter, a novella published in a supplement to Der fraynd (The Friend, the first Yiddish daily newspaper published in Czarist Russia) about a young, orphaned teacher who, due to societal pressure, must marry in order to continue teaching the students in his deceased father's heder.
- 1904: Falik un zayn hoyz (Falik and His House), a novella published in Der fraynd (The Friend) about an elderly man unwilling to leave his dilapidated old house in Eastern Europe to live with his children in America.
- 1905: Der krizis: ertsehlung fun soḥrishen leben (The Crisis: A Story of the Lives of Merchants), a novella published in Der fraynd (The Friend) about the changing economic conditions for businesses at the time of the Russo-Japanese War.
- 1909: Di velt-geshihte: fun di eltste tkufes biz der letster tsayt (World History: From Ancient Times to the Present), Volume 1 of a series on world history.
- 1909: Shimshn Shlomo mit zayn ferd: oder, A holem fun a gevezenem shmayser (Samson Solomon and His Horses, or: A Dream of an Ex-Coachman), an allegorical short story about Jews under the rule of the Czar.
- 1909: Gitele’s Yonkiper (Gitele's Yom Kippur)
- 1909: Hine: dos land (China: The land), a geography education and outreach book.
- 1909: Indyen: dos land (India: The land), a geography education and outreach book.
- 1928-29: Tsvey mames: roman (Two Mothers: novel), a story about an orphaned boy who is unable to marry the young woman he loves because her mother raised him after his mother died.
- 1928-29: Zikhroynes un bilder: Shtetl, kinderyorn, shraybers (Memories and Scenes: Shtetl, Childhood, Writers), a collection of Dinezon's early short stories.
