= Ryhor Baradulin =

Belarusian poet

Ryhor Baradulin Рыго́р Янавіч Бараду́лін
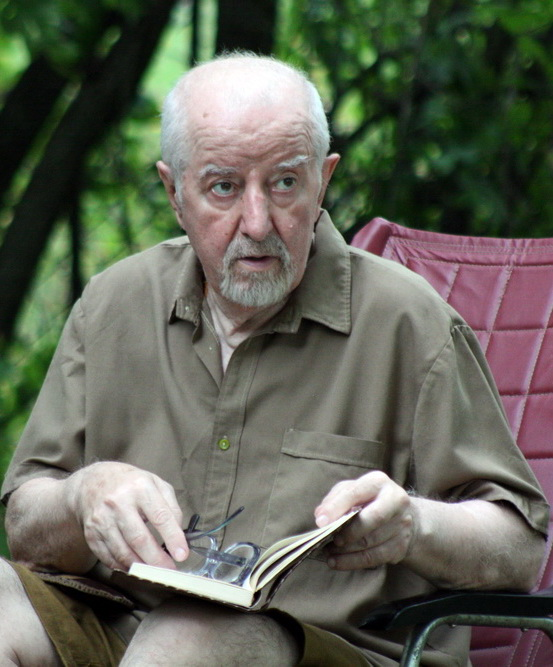
- Baradulin in 2010
- Born: 24 February 1935; Vierasoŭka, Ushachy Raion, Belarusian SSR
- Died: 2 March 2014 (aged 79); Minsk, Belarus
- Education: Belarusian State University
- Occupations: Poet, essayist and translator

Ryhor Janavič Baradulin (Belarusian: Рыго́р Янавіч Бараду́лін; 24 February 1935 – 2 March 2014) was a Belarusian poet, essayist and translator.

== Biography ==
Ryhor Baradulin was born in 1935 in Vierasoŭka, Ushachy Raion, to Ivan and Akulina Baradulin. He graduated from a school in Ushachy in 1954, and continued his education at the Belarusian State University in Minsk, from which he graduated in 1959.

Baradulin worked as an editor in various periodicals (including a newspaper, The Soviet Belarus and such magazines as Byarozka and Polymya). He worked in some publishing agencies like Belarus and Mastackaja Litaratura. He was a member of the Belarusian Writer's Union and the Belarusian PEN-center (and was President of the center during 1990–1999), a member of the BPF Party.

== Works and awards ==
Baradulin was the last Belarusian who received the title of the People's Poet (1992). He received some other important awards for several books of poems and translations. He started publishing his works in 1953.

His first poems appeared in the newspaper "Čyrvonaja źmiena". The first book of his poems, "Maładzik nad stepam" appeared in 1959. All in all Ryhor Baradulin published around 70 books of poems (including poems for children, satiric and humorous poems), articles, essays, translations. In 2006, Baradulin was nominated for the Nobel Prize in Literature for his book of poems called Ksty.

== Death ==
Baradulin died in 2014 at the age of 79.
