= Ushachy district =

District of Vitebsk region, Belarus

Ushachy district Ушацкі раён (Belarusian)
- District
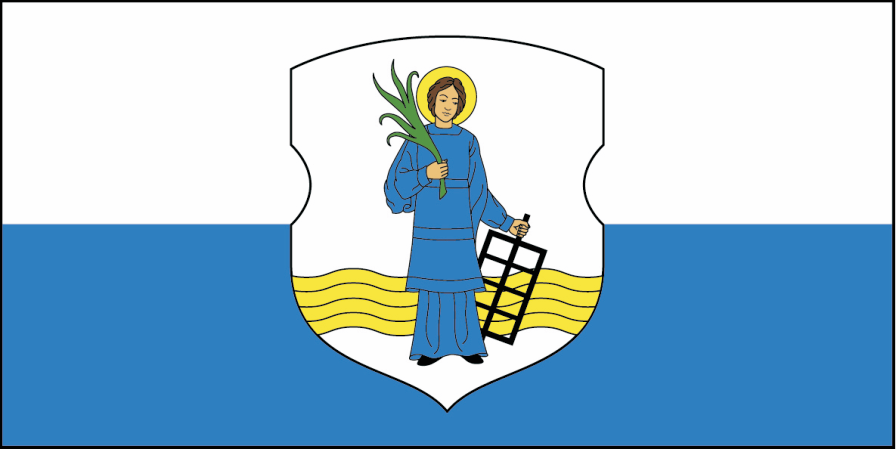
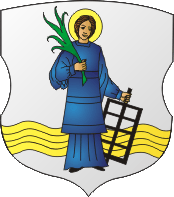
- Flag Coat of arms

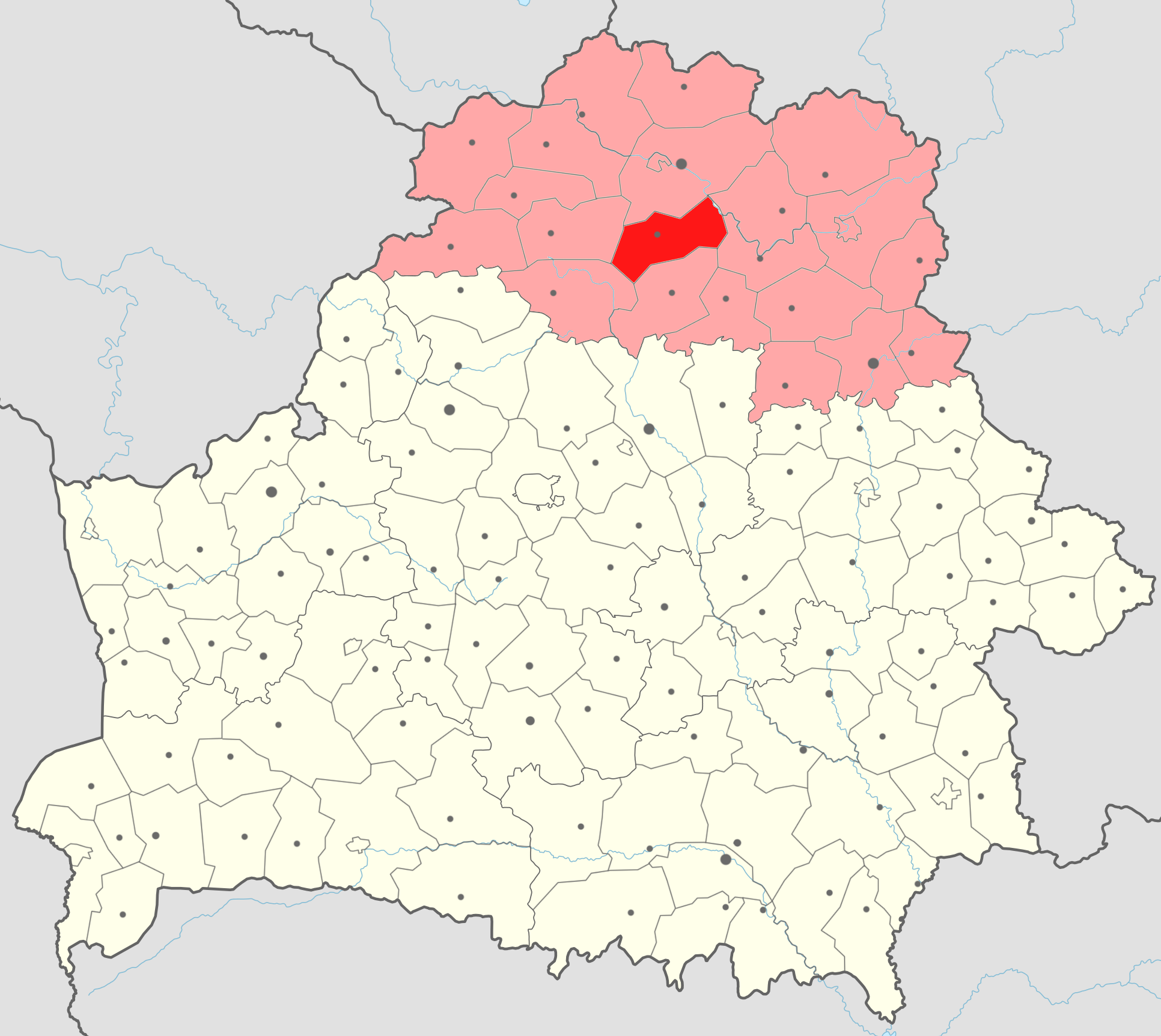
- Coordinates: 55°11′N 28°37′E
- Country: Belarus
- Region: Vitebsk region
- Administrative center: Ushachy

Area
  - Total: 1,489.38 km^{2} (575.05 sq mi)
- Elevation: 169 m (554 ft)

Population (2023)
  - Total: 11,732
  - Density: 7.8771/km^{2} (20.402/sq mi)
- Time zone: UTC+3 (MSK)

Ushachy district (Belarusian: Ушацкі раён; Russian: Ушачский район) is a district (raion) of Vitebsk region in Belarus. Its administrative center is Ushachy.

== Notable residents ==
- Ryhor Baradulin (1935, Verasoǔka village – 2014), Belarusian poet, essayist and translator
- Vasíl Býkaŭ (1924, Byčki village – 2003), prominent Belarusian writer
- Chaim Zhitlowsky (1865, Ushachy – 1943), Jewish philosopher, writer, and Yiddishist
