= Joshua Mordechai Lifshitz =

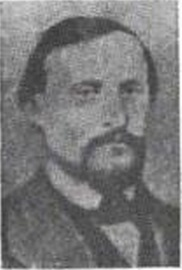
Jehoshua Mordechai Lifschitz (1829–1878), the father of Yiddish lexicography

Jehoshua Mordechai Lifschitz (Wininger IV, 133: Josua Mordechai Lipschütz; Jewish Encyclopedia III, 1112: Lifschiz, Schi'e Mordche; born 1829 in Berdichev, Russian Empire; died 2 August 1878 there) was a Russian-born lexicographer and author of the Haskalah era. A theorist of the Yiddish movement in the 19th century, he advocated the idea of a secular Jewish culture based on Yiddish. His works include a Yiddish–Russian and a Russian–Yiddish dictionary. Lifschitz opposed both the flowery, overly ornate Haskalah literature that dismissed Yiddish as incapable of culture, as well as the Russification efforts on the other side, and consciously and consistently championed the Yiddish language. In doing so, he developed and used arguments that were adopted unchanged as axioms by the modern Yiddish movement half a century later.

== Life ==
Little is known about his early life, but it is clear that he emerged from the Haskalah movement, whose members took care to write in pure Hebrew.

Classified as the “father” of Yiddishism and Yiddish lexicography, Lifschitz did not regard Yiddish as a jargon, but as an independent language, and was the first to call the language “Yiddish.” He worked to establish rules of grammar and orthography based on the Yiddish dialect of his native Volhynia (he was born in Berdichev).

In his essay “The Four Classes” (Yiddish: di fir klasn די פיר קלאסן), he described Yiddish as a language completely separate from German and Hebrew and, in the European context of his audience, as the “mother tongue” of the Jewish people.

The 1870s were marked by intensifying tensions between advocates of the revival of the Hebrew language and radical Yiddishists, who rejected one another. Hebrew was sharply attacked by Lifschitz and declared by him to be a dead and degenerate literary language.

Lifschitz persuaded the young maskil Sholem Yankev Abramovitsh (Mendele the Bookseller), with whom he was closely associated, to write literature in Yiddish, despite the coldness and contempt with which Yiddish was received at the time. In 1861, he persuaded the editor of Ha-Meliz, Alexander Halevi Zederbaum, to publish the first modern Yiddish newspaper, titled Kol Mevasser, to which leading figures of the Yiddish world in Russia contributed, as did Lifschitz himself, who wrote a series of popular-science articles in dialogue form (on astronomy, physics, chemistry, and economics).

== Works (selection) ==
- Yiddish–German Dictionary and German–Yiddish Dictionary (preparatory work in 1867, unpublished), the first modern-language dictionary
- Rusish-yudisher verter-bikh (Russian–Yiddish Dictionary) (Zhitomir: Y. M. Baksht 1869), 360 pp.
- Yudesh-risisher verter bikh (Yiddish–Russian Dictionary) (Zhitomir: Y. M. Baksht 1876), 223 pp.

== Literature ==
- Marion Aptroot, Roland Gruschka: Yiddish: History and Culture of a World Language. 2010
- Susanne Klingenstein: How to Haul the Cow into the Attic. FAZ, 30 April 2013
- Berl Kagan, comp., Leksikon fun yidish-shraybers (Biographical dictionary of Yiddish writers) (New York, 1986), col. 338
- Dan Cohn-Sherbok: Dictionary of Jewish Biography. 2005 (Online)
- Goldsmith, Emanuel S. (1997). Modern Yiddish Culture: The Story of the Yiddish Language Movement. Fordham University Press. ISBN 978-0-8232-1695-6
- Janina Wurbs: Generationenübergreifender Jiddischismus: Skizzen kultureller Biographien der Familie Beyle Schaechter-Gottesman (Pri ha-Pardes). 2018 Online preview

== See also ==
- Czernowitz Conference
