= Peretz Square =

Square in Manhattan, New York

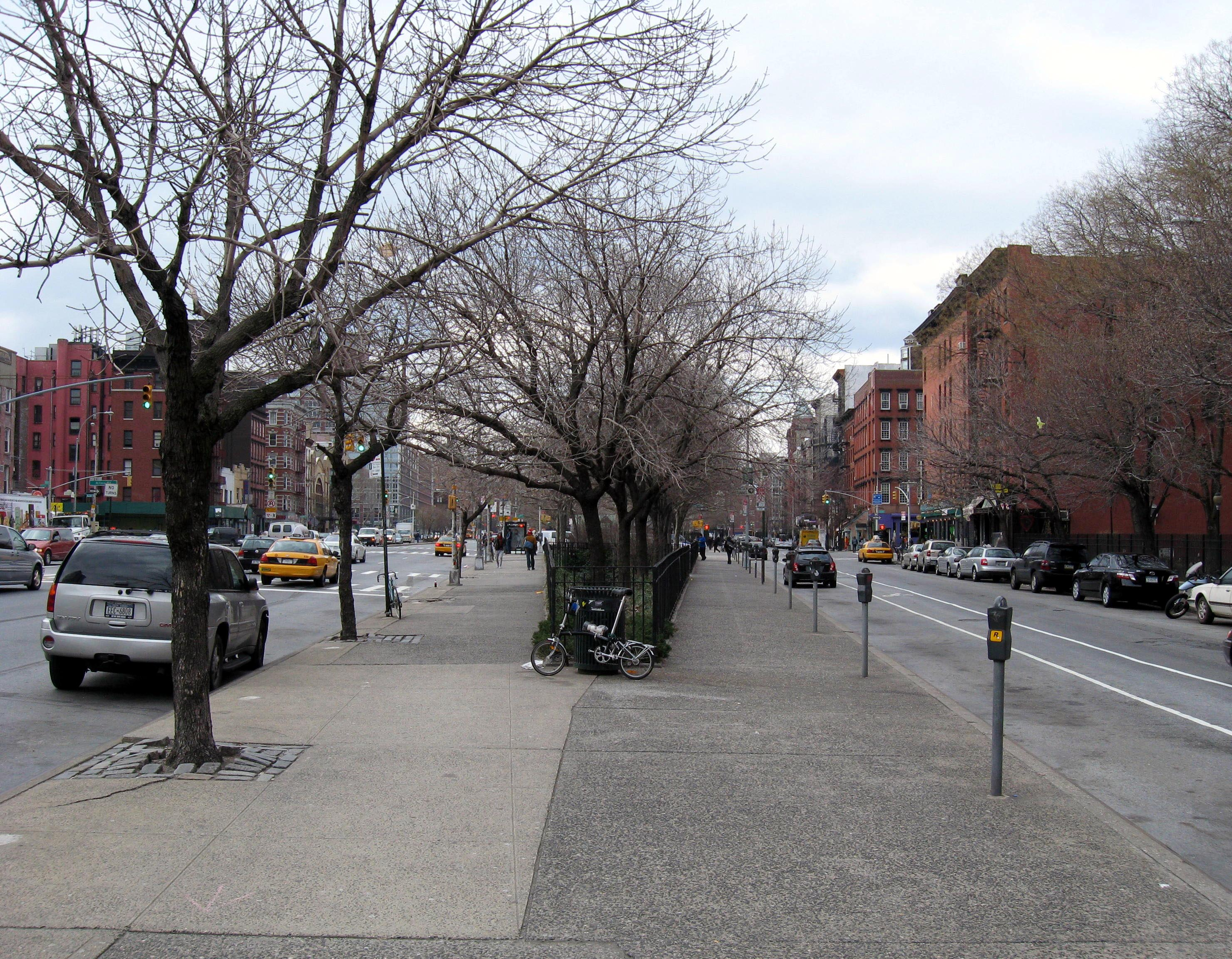
- Houston St on left; 1st St on right
- Interactive map of Peretz Square
- Location: where Houston Street, First Avenue, and First Street meet, Lower Manhattan, New York City
- Coordinates: 40°43′22.5″N 73°59′16.5″W

Peretz Square is a public park in Lower Manhattan, New York City, which marks the spot where Houston Street, First Avenue, and First Street meet. Peretz Square marks the spot where the smaller grid of the Lower East Side meets the grand regularity of the Commissioners' Plan street grid of 1811.

The surrounding neighborhood was largely populated by Jewish immigrants in the late nineteenth and early twentieth centuries, and was named after the Polish Yiddish language author and playwright Isaac Leib Peretz (1852-1915). The square was dedicated on November 23, 1952. Peretz played a major role in the early development of both Yiddish and Hebrew literature, and was particularly beloved for his simultaneous appreciation of both traditional Judaism and socialist doctrine.
