= Yiddishist movement =

Yiddish language and culture preservation movement

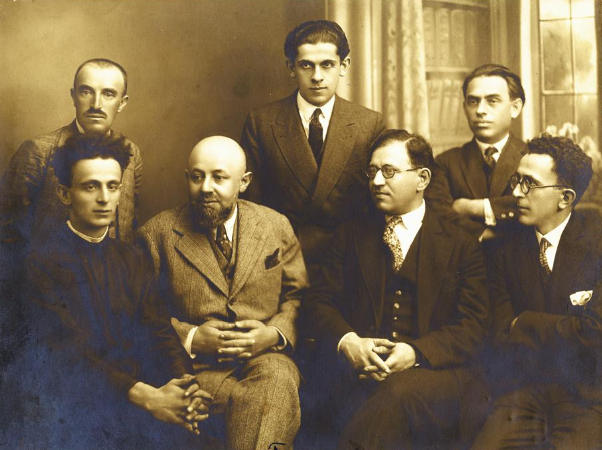
Czernowitz Conference 20th anniversary (standing, left to right) Shloyme Lerner, Hertz Grosbard, Mordechai Goldenberg (seated, left to right) Itzik Manger, Noach Pryłucki, Zalman Reisen, and Yisroel Rubin. Photograph by Jacob Brüll.

Yiddishism (Note: Yiddish: ײִדישיזם, romanized: Yidishizm) is a cultural and linguistic movement that advocates and promotes the use of Yiddish, the traditional vernacular of Ashkenazi Jews, which was spoken by over 11 million people before World War II. It began in Eastern Europe during the latter part of the 19th century. Some of the leading founders of this movement were Mendele Mocher Sforim, I. L. Peretz, and Sholem Aleichem. The Yiddishist movement gained popularity alongside the growth of the Jewish Labor Bund and other Jewish political movements, particularly in the Russian Empire and United States.

The movement sharply lost momentum in the course of the 20th century, hampered by the language's low prestige in a context of both Jewish assimilation and Hebrew revival, the physical annihilation of most European Yiddish speakers in the Holocaust, followed by the linguistic assimilation of remaining communities, including in Israel, where Yiddish would wind up largely supplanted by Modern Hebrew.

== 19th-century origins ==
The Haskalah, or Jewish Enlightenment, movement that arose in the late 18th century played a large role in rejecting Yiddish as a Jewish language. However, many maskilim, particularly in the Russian Empire, expanded the Yiddish press to use it as a tool to spread their enlightenment ideas, thereby building a platform for future Yiddishists. Aleksander Zederbaum, a prominent member of the Haskalah, founded the influential Yiddish periodical Kol Mevasser, which would become a mainstay of the Yiddish press, including not only news but also stories and several novels in serialization.

Joshua Mordechai Lifshitz, who is considered the father of Yiddishism and Yiddish lexicography, circulated an essay entitled “The Four Classes” (Yiddish: די פיר קלאַסן, romanized: Di fir Klasn) in 1861 in which he referred to Yiddish as a completely separate language from both German and Hebrew, and in the European context of his audience, the "mother tongue" of the Jewish people. In the essay, which was eventually published in 1863 in an early issue of the influential Yiddish periodical Kol Mevasser, he contended that the refinement and development of Yiddish were indispensable for the humanization and education of Jews. In a subsequent essay published in the same periodical, he also proposed Yiddish as a bridge linking Jewish and European cultures. Scholar Mordkhe Schaechter characterizes Lifshitz as "[t]he first conscious, goal-oriented language reformer" in the field of Yiddish, and highlights his pivotal role in countering the negative attitudes toward the language propagated within the Haskalah, or Jewish Enlightenment movement:

Although an adherent of the Enlightenment, [Lifshitz] broke with its sterile anti-Yiddish philosophy, to become an early ideologue of Yiddishism and of Yiddish-language planning. He courageously stood up for the denigrated folk tongue, calling for its elevation and cultivation. He did this in the form of articles in the weekly Kol-mevaser (in the 1860s) and in his excellent Russian-Yiddish and Yiddish-Russian dictionaries [...].

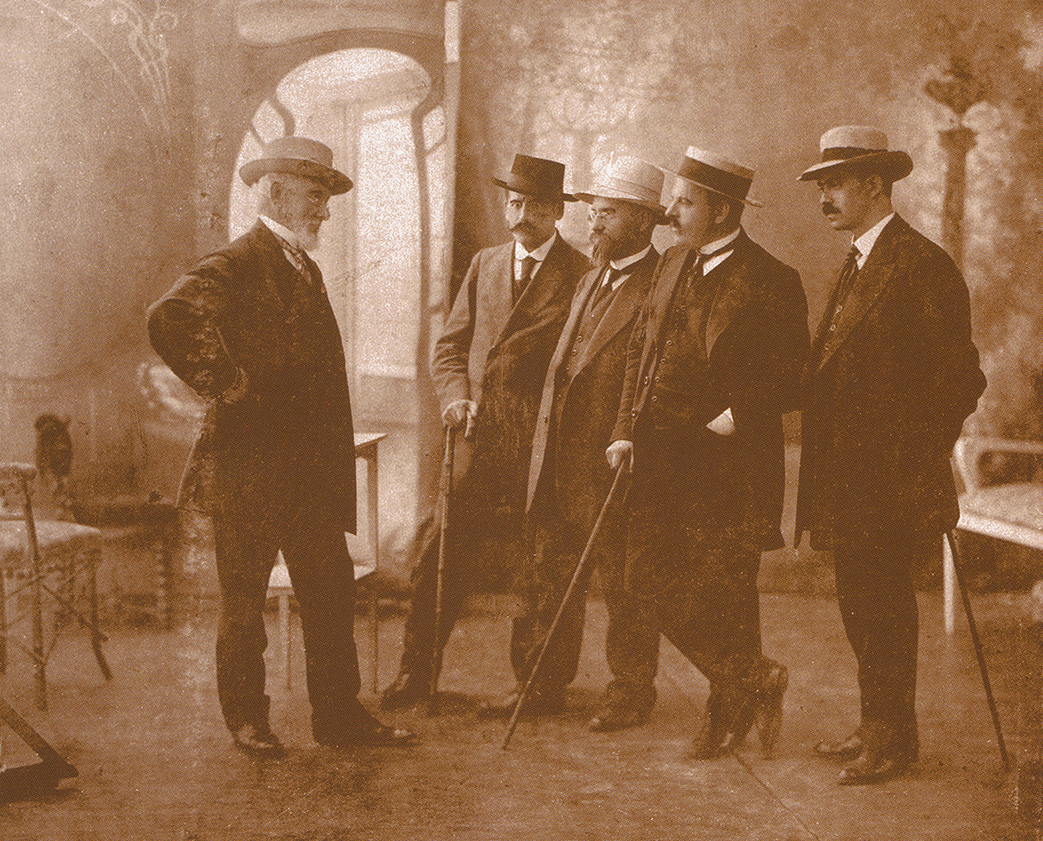
Yiddish writers from Odessa (left to right) Mendele Moykher-Sforim, Alter Druyanow, Yehoshu'a Ravnitski, Ḥayim Naḥman Bialik, and Yitshak Dov Berkowitz, 1910

Several prominent Yiddish authors also emerged in this time, transforming the perception of Yiddish from a "jargon" of no literary value into an accepted artistic language. Mendele Mocher Sforim, Sholem Aleichem, and I. L. Peretz are regarded as foundational to modern Yiddish fiction and were highly influential, central figures in the Yiddishist movement.

== The Czernowitz Conference ==
Czernowitz Conference
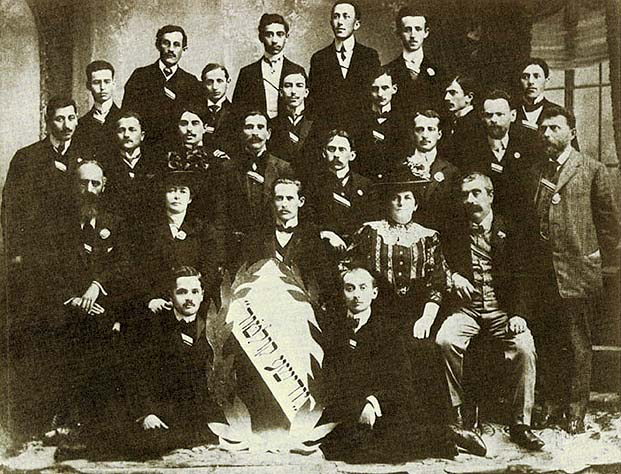
- Group photo of some participants of the conference
- Native name: טשערנאָוויצער קאָנפֿערענץ
- Date: August 30 – September 4, 1908
- Location: Czernowitz, Austria-Hungary
- Theme: Status of Yiddish as the language of the Jewish people
- Organised by: Nathan Birnbaum and the University of Vienna Yiddish club
- Participants: 70

The Conference for the Yiddish Language (קאָנפֿערענץ פֿאָר דער ייִדישער שפּראַך, Konferents for der Yidisher Shprakh), commonly known as the Czernowitz Conference (טשערנאָוויצער קאָנפֿערענץ, Tshernovitser Konferents) was held from August 30 to September 4, 1908 in the Austro-Hungarian city of Czernowitz, Bukovina (now Chernivtsi, Ukraine). The conference, which proclaimed Yiddish a modern language with a developing high culture, was proposed by Nathan Birnbaum, and organized by members of the University of Vienna's Yiddish club, which he founded. He promoted the conference in a 1908 trip to America. Jacob Gordin, David Pinski, Chaim Zhitlowsky, and A. M. Evalenko endorsed the plan and also assisted. The organizers urgently stated that Yiddish was a unifying force in Eastern European Jewry, but needed support because people were ashamed of the language, and it was disorganized.

=== Conference ===
There was no political party or organizational affiliation, and invitations were distributed by geographic proximity. The General Jewish Labour Bund was underrepresented, while local Zionist groups, such as Poale Zion were overrepresented. The conference hosted seventy delegates from various sectors of Jewish life. The only classic Yiddish writer to attend was I. L. Peretz, as Sholem Aleichem and Mendele Mocher Sforim were sick at the time. However many younger Yiddish writers were present, notably Sholem Asch, Avrom Reyzen, and Hersh Dovid Nomberg. Their attendance helped attain publicity in newspapers for the conference. Other notable delegates included Noach Pryłucki, Matthias Mieses, Mordecai Spector, and Gershom Bader.

Solomon Birnbaum, Nathan's son, kept the minutes, which were lost or destroyed during World War I. The agenda attempted to avoid politics, but was wide in scope, advocating the promotion of Yiddish teachers, schools, press, literature, and theatre. It also sought to reverse the trends among young people toward Hebrew and other local national languages, translate the Bible into the language, and standardize the orthography. Peretz gave an ambitious and authoritative speech about the future aspirations of Yiddish, which was taken with "spiritual hunger" by the attendees, according to Mieses.

=== Status of Yiddish ===
Pinski correctly expected there would be a question of the status of Yiddish. Attendees questioned if Yiddish was only "a" national language of the Jewish people, or if it was "the" national language. This topic soon dominated the discussion at the expense of the rest of the agenda. Even among the two sides were varying motivations. Esther Frumkin felt that the conference was not class conscious and would reject the Bundist view that Yiddish was the language of the Jewish people. She walked out of a banquet when fellow delegates were not seated because they did not wear suit jackets. The Bund later maintained that the conference was a minor event and did not start a Yiddishist movement. Attendees from Galicia had hoped the conference would adopt Yiddish as the national language of the Jewish people, expecting a language question in the 1910 Austro-Hungarian census.

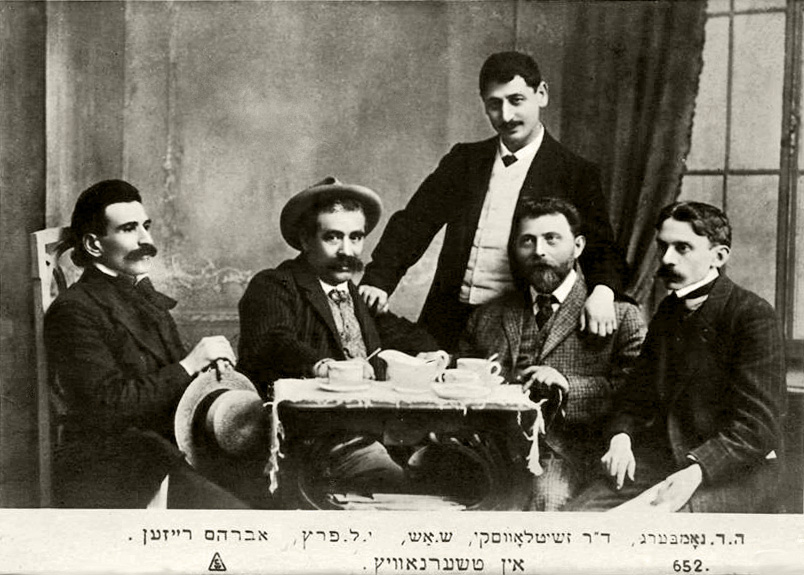
A widely publicized postcard depicting attendees of the conference: Avrom Reyzen, I. L. Peretz, Sholem Asch, Chaim Zhitlowsky, and Hersh Dovid Nomberg (l-r).

Meanwhile, Zionist and religious attendees felt that pro-Yiddish sentiments impacted the revival of Hebrew. Some were deeply upset when Hebrew was deemed a "putrefying cadaver", a relic of the past and of prayer. Religious delegates also felt the conference was too secular.

Nomberg proposed a resolution that was ultimately adopted, which deemed Yiddish was a national language of the Jewish people. It was a compromise view, but still left many dissatisfied. Birnbaum was tapped to run an organization birthed from the conference, which was to promote speakers, publish books, establish schools and courses, promote music and theatre, and plan future international conferences. However, the position was unpaid and fundraising was limited and he turned to Agudat Yisrael to preserve and unify the Jewish people. Asch, Nomberg, Peretz, and Reyzen toured Jewish communities of Galicia and Bukovina to promote interest in Yiddish language, literature, and culture.

=== Legacy ===
The conference ultimately only had a symbolic value, but marked a high point of developing Yiddish culture, increasing its prestige. It did not lead directly to any of the subsequent organizations that promoted Yiddishism, such as the Central Yiddish School Organization in 1921, YIVO in 1925, and the post-Holocaust Congress for Jewish Culture in 1948, but laid the groundwork for them. Hillel Zeitlin, Reuben Brainin, and Morris Rosenfeld criticized it, Ahad Ha'am ridiculed the conference as a "Purim spectacle". However, Shmuel Niger and Israel Isidor Elyashev considered it a historic achievement.

Modern scholarly assessment varies, with Philip Kutner noting the conference was a failure, but also held that it legitimized what was until then "a language of the streets". Emanuel Goldsmith stated in an interview with Jewish Currents that the conference put not Yiddish, but Yiddishism, "on the map": the idea to preserve, sustain, develop, and encourage culture in the language. Ruth Kaswan wrote that the conference "was a landmark occasion in the rise of Jewish consciousness and liberation...[and] a declaration of solidarity with the Jewish masses that was by definition a revolutionary act." She cited the creation of a school system, and an almost parallel state within the states of Eastern Europe, during the interbellum, as well as a "sense of pride and identity".

According to professor Iosif Vaisman, the conference also increased the prominence of the city of Czernowitz, and inspired similar conferences for Hebrew and Catalan. He also noted that it led to the creation of secular Jewish schools, teaching of the grammar and literature, as well as an increase in Yiddish writers and books. He contends that it helped develop the Bund movement, and discussions on the rights of minorities even influenced the Treaty of Versailles.

The conference was commemorated nearly every decade since it was held, notably in 1928. A fiftieth anniversary gathering was held in Montreal. Gatherings were held around the world for the 100th anniversary, in La Jolla, California, Czernowitz itself, and at York University in Toronto where a conference was held on April 13–14, 2008, titled "Czernowitz at 100: The First Yiddish Language Conference in Historical Perspective".

== YIVO ==
YIVO (Yiddish Scientific Institute) was established in Wilno, Poland (Vilnius, now part of Lithuania) in 1925. YIVO was initially proposed by Yiddish linguist and writer Nochum Shtif. He characterized his advocacy of Yiddish as "realistic" Jewish nationalism, contrasted to the "visionary" Hebraists, and the "self-hating" assimilationists who adopted German, Russian, or Polish. YIVO’s work was largely secular in nature, reflecting its original members. The Division of Philology, which included Max Weinreich, standardized Yiddish orthography under YIVO. Simultaneously, the Division of History, originally headed by Elias Tcherikower, translated major works from Russian to Yiddish and conducted further research on historical topics.

== Soviet Russia – The Bund ==
A Bundist poster

The General Jewish Labour Bund in Lithuania, Poland and Russia, a secular Jewish socialist party in the Russian Empire, was founded in Vilnius in 1897, and active through 1920, promoted the use of Yiddish as a Jewish national language, and to some extent opposed the Zionist project of reviving Hebrew. Moreover, beyond the Labour Bund group in Poland, the International Jewish Labor Bund regarded Yiddish as the Jewish national language.

In the Soviet Union during the 1920s, Yiddish was promoted as the language of the Jewish proletariat. It became one of the official languages in the Ukrainian People's Republic and in some of the Soviet republics, such as the Belarusian Soviet Socialist Republic and the Galician Soviet Socialist Republic. A few of the republics included Yiddish public institutions like post offices and courts. A public educational system entirely based on the Yiddish language was established and comprised kindergartens, schools, and higher educational institutions. Advanced research institutions and Yiddish publishing houses began to open throughout the Soviet Union. At the same time, Hebrew was considered a bourgeois language and its use was generally discouraged.

The Soviet Union created the Jewish Autonomous Oblast in 1928. Located in the Russian Far East and bordering China, its administrative center was the town of Birobidzhan. There, the Soviets envisaged setting up a new "Soviet Zion", where a proletarian Jewish culture could be developed. Yiddish, rather than Hebrew, would be the national language, although, concurrently, the Soviets made immigration to Birobidzhan very difficult. Ultimately, the vast majority of the Yiddish-language cultural institutions in the Soviet Union were closed in the late 1930s.

By the mid-1930s, Soviet rule forced scholars to work under intense restrictions. Soviet legislation dictated the content, vocabulary, and spelling of Yiddish scholarship. Before long, leading Yiddish writers and scholars were arrested and executed in 1937. Stalinist orders then gradually closed down the remaining publishing houses, research academies, and schools. Growing persecution of surviving Yiddish authors ultimately came to an end on August 12, 1952. Stalin ordered the execution of twenty-four prominent Yiddish scholars and artists in the Soviet Union all in a single night.

== United States ==
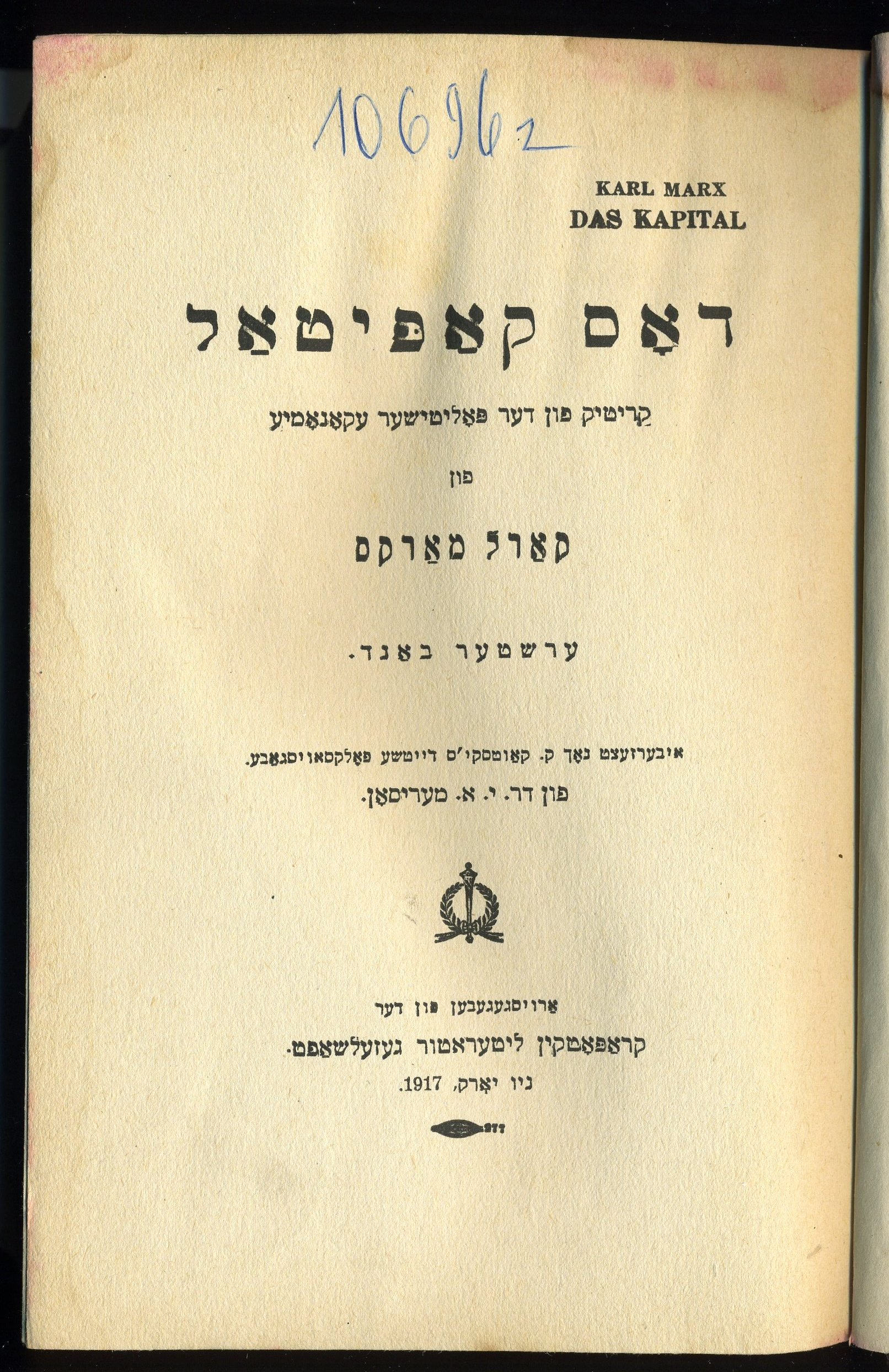
Yiddish translation of Das Kapital, translated by Doctor Jacob Abraham Maryson, published by Maryson's publishing company, the Kropotkin Literatur Gezelshaft, New York, 1917.

As many Eastern European Jews began to emigrate to the United States, the movement became very active there, especially in New York City. One aspect of this became known as Yiddish Theatre, and involved authors such as Ben Hecht and Clifford Odets.

Yiddish also became the language of Jewish labor and political movements in the US. The majority of the Yiddish-speaking political parties from the Pale of Settlement had equivalents in the United States. Notably, even the Zionist parties, like the North-American branch of Poale Zion, published much of their material in Yiddish rather than Hebrew. American Jewish radicals also printed many political newspapers and other materials in Yiddish at the beginning of the 20th century. These included the newspaper Forverts, which began as a socialist endeavor, and the Fraye Arbeter Shtime founded by anarchists.

The Yiddish-speaking Eastern European Jews who came to the US in the late 19th and early 20th centuries were often underpaid and overworked in unsafe conditions, and created many Jewish unions. The United Hebrew Trades, a collective of labor unions founded in 1888, eventually represented over 250,000 members. Forverts, and other leftist Yiddish newspapers, were instrumental in organizing and recruiting for these organizations.

== Contemporary Yiddishism ==
However, the Holocaust's destruction of the extensive European Jewish Yiddish-speaking communities, both secular and religious led to a large decline in the use of Yiddish. Around five million, or 85%, of the Jewish victims of the Holocaust, were speakers of Yiddish. The decline of secular Yiddish education after the Holocaust encouraged the creation of summer programs and university courses at more than 50 institutions, which cater to Yiddish learning. Scholars including Uriel Weinreich, Mordkhe Schaechter, and Marvin Herzog were especially influential in establishing American academic Yiddish programs.

Additionally, the revival of the Hebrew language as the national language of Israel, caused a significant decline in the use of Yiddish in daily Jewish life. To some, Yiddish was seen as the language of the Jewish people in diaspora and believed its use should be extinguished in the early establishment of Israel. Di Goldene Keyt was a literary journal started by Abraham Sutzkever in 1949 in an attempt to bridge the gap between Yiddish and Hebrew literature. In this journal, Yiddish and Hebrew poems and pieces of literature were published but, as the language remained stigmatized in Israel, as a legacy of the fierce rivalry between Hebraists and Yiddishists, much of Sutzkever’s work went unrecognized by the general public until the 1980s.

Although after the Holocaust, usage of Yiddish became more restricted to Haredi communities, they do not hold an exclusive monopoly on the language, and especially in the 21st century, the language appears to regain a measure of interest among young non-Haredi Jews in the United States. The Yugntruf movement was established for young Yiddish speakers in the mid 20th century, and still continues today. The movement also founded the Yiddish Farm in 2012, a farm in New York which offers an immersive education for students to learn and speak in Yiddish. Yiddish is also now offered as a language on Duolingo, used by Jews and others on social media platforms, and offered as a language in schools, on an international scale.

Since the early 21st century, formal programs and cultural initiatives have strengthened the Yiddish revival; Tel Aviv University runs an annual Yiddish Summer Program, offering immersive language classes, creative workshops, film screenings, and guided tours of historically relevant sites, attracting students from multiple countries. Community and cultural centres also continue to support Yiddish language and culture. The Yung yidish centre in Vienna hosts regular language classes, music sessions, discussion groups, and performances, while maintaining connections with similar programs in Tel Aviv. International festivals and lecture series provide further platforms for learning and performance, such as The Yiddish Summer Weimar festival, offering workshops and concerts in Yiddish music, dance, and theatre, attracting participants from around the world. Also, the YIVO Institute’s Yiddish Civilization Lecture Series hosts lectures on literature, history, and cultural topics.

== See also ==
- Anti-Yiddish sentiment
- Yiddish literature
- Yiddish symbols
- War of the Languages
- Jewish political movements
- California Institute for Yiddish Culture and Language
- L. L. Zamenhof §§ Work on Yiddish language and Jewish issues and L. L. Zamenhof's work on Yiddish language
