= Ushachy =

Urban-type settlement in Vitebsk Region, Belarus

Ushachy Ушачы (Belarusian) Ушачи (Russian)
- Urban-type settlement
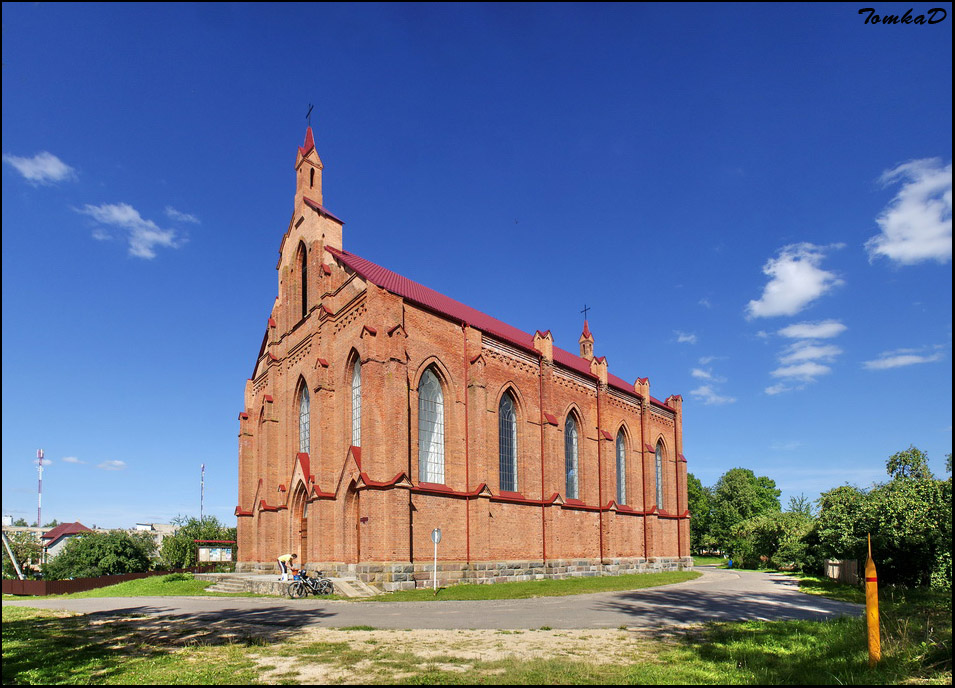

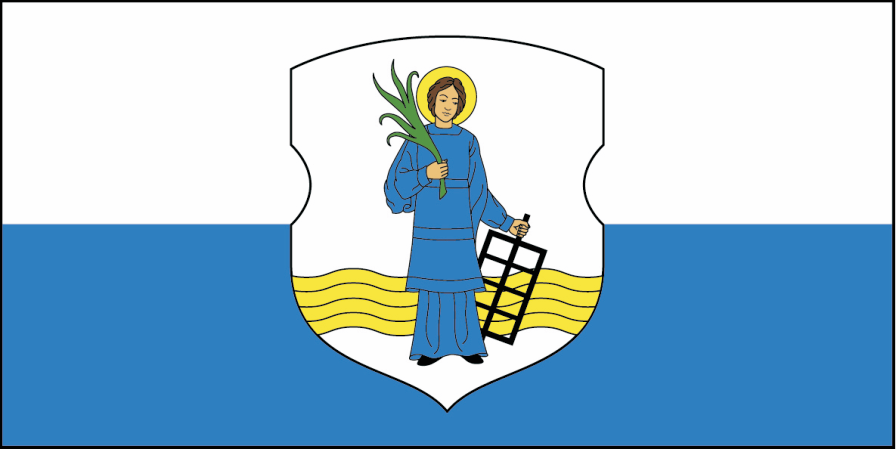
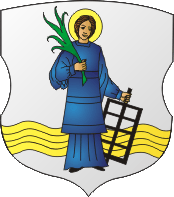
- Flag Coat of arms

- Location within Belarus
- Coordinates: 55°11′0″N 28°37′0″E
- Country: Belarus
- Region: Vitebsk Region
- District: Ushachy District

Population (2024)
  - Total: 5,773
- Time zone: UTC+3 (MSK)
- Website: ushachi.vitebsk-region.gov.by

Ushachy (Belarusian: Ушачы, romanized: Ušačy; Russian: Ушачи, romanized: Ushachi) is an urban-type settlement in Vitebsk Region, Belarus. It serves as the administrative center of Ushachy District. The settlement is located 101 kilometres (63 mi) west of Vitebsk. As of 2024, it has a population of 5,773.

== History ==
Within the Grand Duchy of Lithuania, Ushachy was part of Polotsk Voivodeship. In 1793, as a result of the Second Partition of Poland, Ushachy was attached to the Russian Empire, where it was administered as part of the Lepelsky Uyezd of Vitebsk Governorate.

At the 1939 Soviet census, there were 487 Jews residing in the town of Ushachi, accounting for approximately 23.8% of the total population at that time.

=== World War II ===
Ushachi was under German military occupation from 3 July 1941 until the summer of 1944. As part of the occupation policies, a ghetto was established in Ushachi in October 1941, and likely from November, it was fenced with barbed wire and guarded by a sentinel.

On 12 January 1942, the Jewish population of Ushachi in the ghetto was subjected to mass murder. The killings took place in pre-dug pits near the cemetery, which had been prepared by local residents. Prior to the liquidation, some Jews within the ghetto were able to set fire to the confines and escape. Additionally, a few days later, the Jews from the nearby town of Kublichi were also killed at the same pits where the Ushachi Jews had met their fate.

== Sources ==
- Megargee, Geoffrey P.; Dean, Martin (4 May 2012). The United States Holocaust Memorial Museum Encyclopedia of Camps and Ghettos, 1933 –1945: Volume II: Ghettos in German-Occupied Eastern Europe. Indiana University Press. pp. 1740–1742. ISBN 978-0-253-00202-0.
