= Hersh Dovid Nomberg =

Polish author and translator (1876–1927)

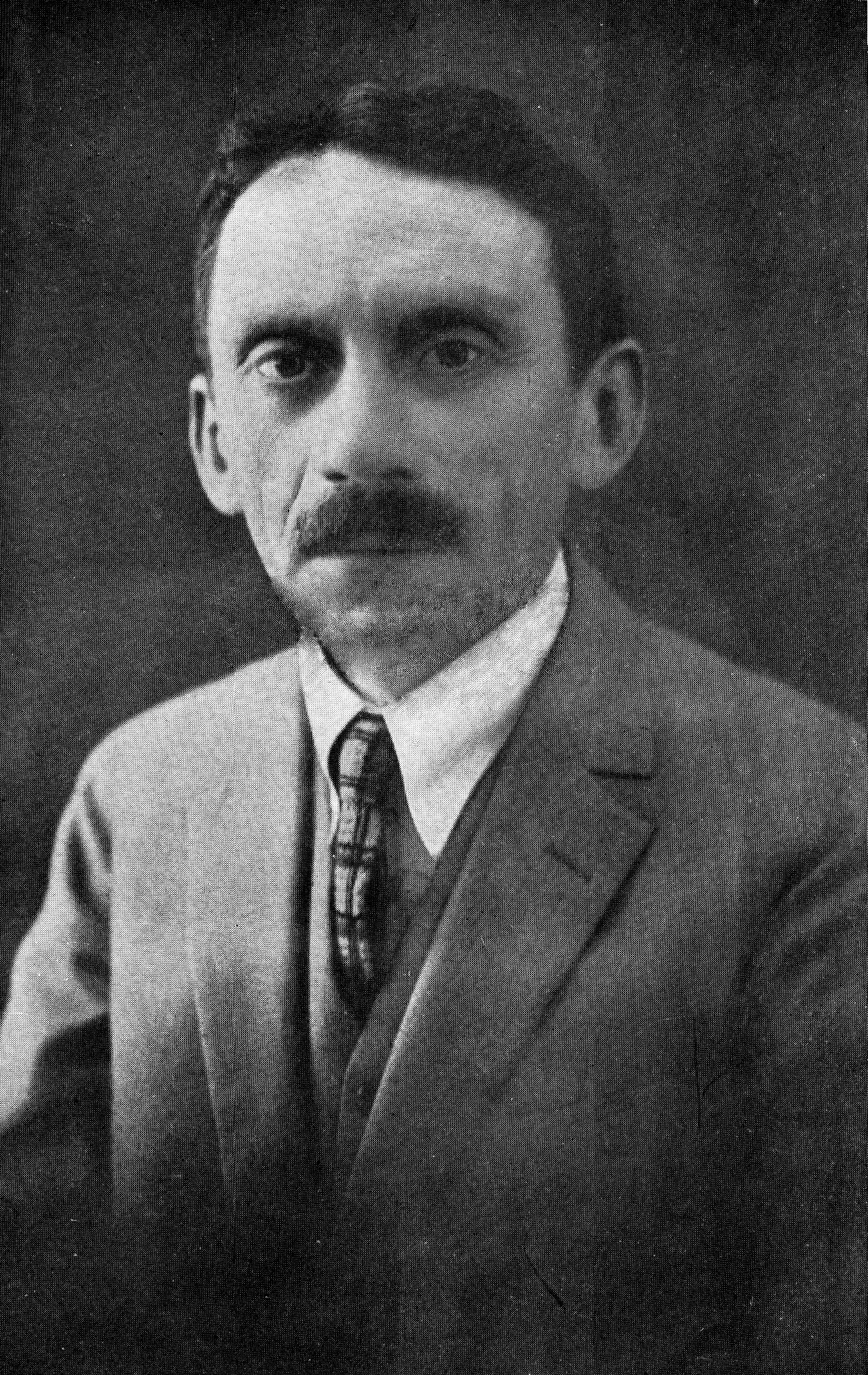
- Hersh Dovid Nomberg
- Born: 14 April 1876; Mszczonów, Poland
- Died: 21 November 1927 (aged 51); Otwock, Poland
- Other names: Hersz Dawid Nomberg, Hirsch David Nomberg
- Occupations: Writer, journalist, and essayist

Hersh Dovid Nomberg (Yiddish: הערש דוד נאָמבערג), also written Hersh David Nomberg (14 April 1876 – 21 November 1927), was a Polish-Jewish writer, journalist, and essayist in the Yiddish language.

== Biography ==
Born in the Polish town of Mszczonów, near Warsaw, he grew up in a Hasidic background, before moving to Warsaw to pursue a career as a writer. Under the influence of his mentor I. L. Peretz he began writing in Yiddish as well as Hebrew. He played an important role in the Czernowitz Conference in 1908. He helped Leib Malach start his writing career in 1915. Nomberg also had a brief career as a politician, serving as a delegate in the Sejm for the Folkspartei.

== Works ==
The following is a partial list of Nombergs's works.

- Happiness (fairy tale, 1900)
- "Fliglman" (short story, 1903)
- Dos shpil in libe (The play at love; novella, 1907)
- "Shvayg shvester!" (short story, 1907)
- A kursistke (A female university student; novella, 1907)
- Tsvishn berg (In the mountains; novella, 1908)
- Di mishpokhe (The family; drama, 1914)
- Toyzend un eyn nakht (translation of 1001 Arabian Nights)

=== Translations into English ===
- "In the Mountains", translated by Joachim Neugroschel, in No Star Too Beautiful. Norton: New York, 2002. ISBN 0-393-05190-0.
- "Friends", translated by Seymour Levitan, in Have I Got a Story for You. Norton: New York, 2016. ISBN 0-393-06270-8
- Warsaw Stories, translated by Daniel Kennedy. White Goat Press: Amherst, 2019. ISBN 9780989373197.
- A Cheerful Soul and Other Stories, translated by Daniel Kennedy. Snuggly Books: Sacramento, 2021. ISBN 9781645250685.
- Between Parents, translated by Ollie Elkus and Daniel Kennedy. Farlag Press: Tours, 2021. ISBN 9791096677092.

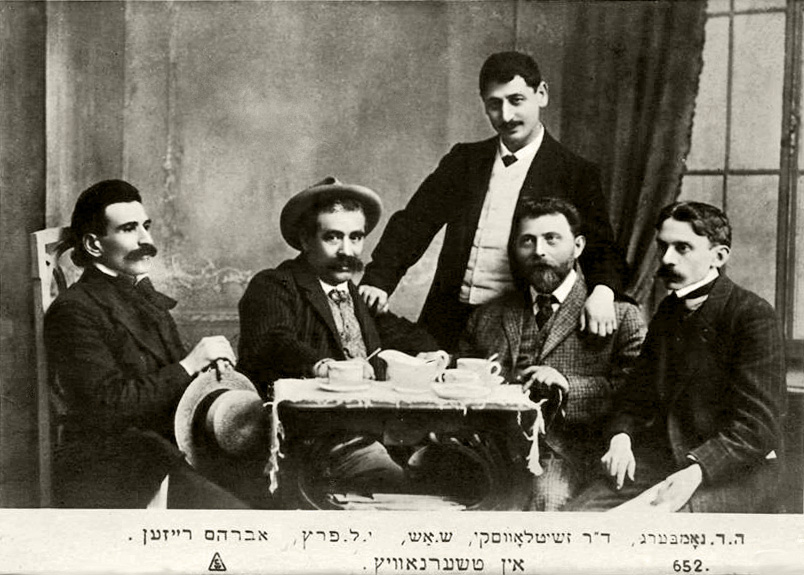
Hersh Dovid Nomberg, Chaim Zhitlovsky, Sholem Asch, I L Peretz, Abraham Reisen during the Czernowitz-Conference 1908
