= Lepelsky Uyezd =

Subdivision of the Vitebsk Governorate, Russian Empire

Lepelsky Uyezd (Лепельский уезд) was one of the subdivisions of the Vitebsk Governorate of the Russian Empire. It was situated in the southern part of the governorate. Its administrative centre was Lepiel (Lepel).

== Demographics ==
At the time of the Russian Empire Census of 1897, Lepelsky Uyezd had a population of 156,706. Of these, 82.0% spoke Belarusian, 11.6% Yiddish, 4.0% Polish, 1.7% Russian, 0.5% Latvian, 0.2% Lithuanian and 0.1% German as their native language.

== See also ==
- Category:People from Vitebsk Governorate
