= I. L. Peretz =

Yiddish language author and playwright

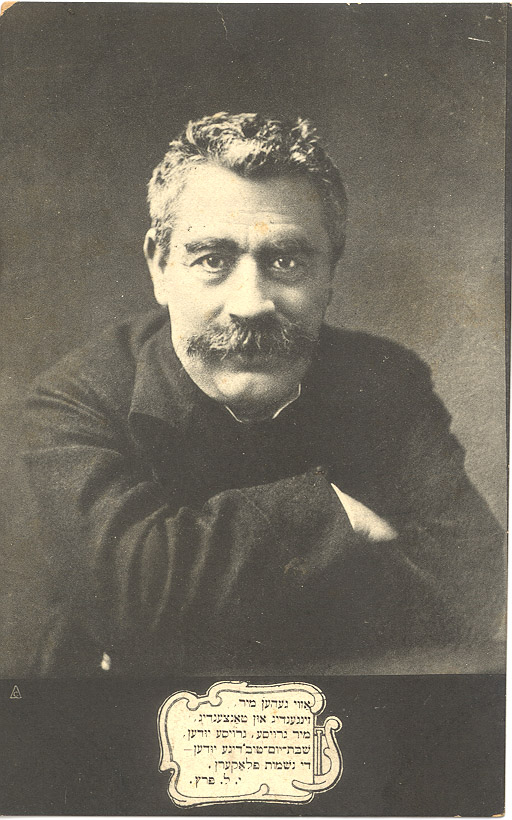
Peretz, depicted on an old Yiddish-language postcard

Isaac Leib Peretz (May 18, 1852 – April 3, 1915), also sometimes written Yitskhok Leybush Peretz (Polish: Icchok Lejbusz Perec; Yiddish: יצחק־לייבוש פרץ), was a Polish Jewish writer and playwright writing in Yiddish. Payson R. Stevens, Charles M. Levine, and Sol Steinmetz count him with Mendele Mokher Seforim and Sholem Aleichem as one of the three great classical Yiddish writers. Sol Liptzin wrote: "Yitzkhok Leibush Peretz was the great awakener of Yiddish-speaking Jewry and Sholom Aleichem its comforter... Peretz aroused in his readers the will for self-emancipation, the will for resistance against the many humiliations to which they were being subjected."

Peretz rejected cultural universalism, seeing the world as composed of different nations, each with its own character. In Liptzin's account, "[e]very people is seen by him to be a chosen people, chosen by its peculiar history, geography and ethnic composition"; he conceived of Jewish literature as "grounded in Jewish traditions and Jewish history", and as "the expression of Jewish ideals".

Peretz was part of the Haskalah movement. In the 1870s, as a young maskil, Peretz looked down upon Yiddish as “jargon,” a term of contempt employed by many Jewish intellectuals. After the pogroms of 1881, which set off the first great wave of migration to America, Peretz's feeling for Yiddish grew warmer and he began to connect to the East European Jewish intelligentsia's movement towards Yiddish, yet intent upon a rationalist modernizing of Jewish thought.

However, while many other Maskilim mocked or derided Hasidic Judaism, Peretz greatly respected the Hasidic Jews for their mode of being in the world; at the same time, his narratives made allowances for human frailty.

His short stories such as "If Not Higher", "The Treasure", and "Beside the Dying" emphasize "unsensational deeds of piety" over empty religiosity.

Peretz eventually became a leading founder in the Yiddishist movement. He is regarded as foundational to modern Yiddish fiction and one of the highly influential, central figures in the Yiddishist movement.

== Biography ==
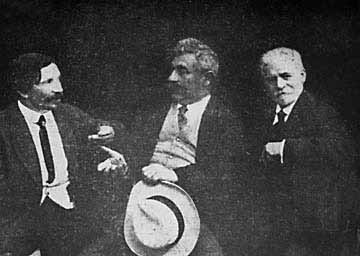
Left to right, Sholem Aleichem, Peretz, and Jacob Dinezon

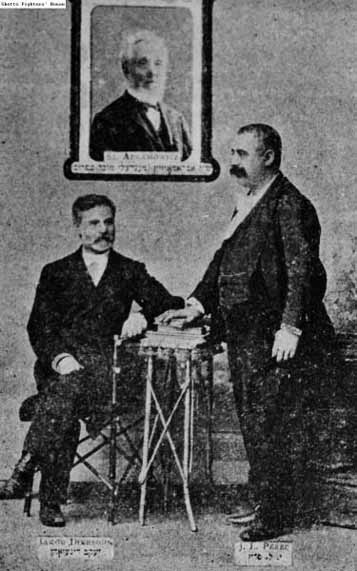
Dinezon and Peretz

Born in Zamość, in Lublin Governorate, Congress Poland, a city known as an important center of the Haskalah, or Jewish enlightenment, Peretz was raised there in an Orthodox Jewish home. His father, Yude, was a merchant, and his mother, Rivke, also helped to run the family's shop; Peretz was the oldest of three siblings who survived to adulthood. Mostly taught by private tutors, he received a traditional Jewish education in Hebrew and rabbinic texts, and for a short time, at around the age of 13, studied at yeshivot in Zamość and the nearby town of Szczebrzeszyn. He also had tutors for Russian, Polish, and German. Upon gaining access to a private library, he avidly read secular books in Polish, Russian, and German, as well as French, which he had learned on his own. At one point he hoped to study either at a secular gymnasium, or at the theologically liberal rabbinical school at Zhytomyr, but his mother opposed such plans. When he was around 18 years old, his parents arranged his marriage to Sarah, the daughter of the Hebrew author Gabriel Judah Lichtenfeld, whom Liptzin describes as a "minor poet and philosopher".

For the next several years Peretz embarked upon various business ventures in the region, including a failed attempt to make a living distilling whiskey. His marriage with Sarah ended in divorce after five years; they had one child together, Lucian, born about 1874. In 1876-1877 he lived in Warsaw, where he worked as a Hebrew tutor, before returning to Zamość. By this time he had begun to write Hebrew poetry; in 1877, together with his former father-in-law Lichtenfeld, he published his first book of Hebrew poetry.

In 1878, Peretz married Helena Ringelheim, the daughter of a well-off merchant. At about the same time, he prepared for and passed the attorney's examination, and for the next decade successfully practiced as a private lawyer in Zamość.

Around 1887–1888, Peretz's law license was revoked by the Imperial Russian authorities, who suspected him of promoting socialist and Polish nationalist ideas. With that he lost his income and his home, since he was unable to find other employment in the city. He found temporary work in 1890 as a member of an expedition, sponsored by philanthropist Jan Bloch, to conduct a statistical survey of Polish Jews; his experiences visiting small towns and villages of the Tomaszów province in southeastern Poland became the basis of his fictional sketches Bilder fun a Provints-Rayze (Pictures from a Provincial Journey). After that, Peretz settled permanently in Warsaw, where, beginning in 1891, he worked as a record-keeper in the small bureaucracy of the city's Jewish community.

His first published Yiddish work, the long ballad Monish, appeared in 1888, as his contribution to the landmark anthology Di Yidishe Folksbibliotek (Jewish People's Library), edited by Sholem Aleichem. The ballad tells the story of an ascetic young man, Monish, who unsuccessfully struggles to resist the temptress Lilith.

Peretz assisted other Yiddish writers in publishing their work, including his lifelong friend Jacob Dinezon, Der Nister and Lamed Shapiro. He also collaborated with them on multiple anthologies and publications, such as Di yontef bletlekh (Holiday Pages), another landmark Yiddish literary anthology in which he participated together with fellow authors Jacob Dinezon, Mordecai Spector, and David Pinski.

Around 1907, Peretz initiated a Yiddish dramatic group within the recently founded Hazomir (The Nightingale), an association for Jewish music and literature, which became a lively cultural center of pre-World War I Yiddish Warsaw.

Towards the end of his life, as refugees poured into Warsaw from the war zone between Russia and Germany, Peretz and fellow author Jacob Dinezon helped found an orphanage and establish schools for displaced Jewish children.

Peretz died in the city of Warsaw, Congress Poland, in 1915. He was buried at the Okopowa Street Jewish Cemetery with a huge crowd, about 100,000 strong, attending the burial ceremony.

== Works ==
Peretz wrote in both Hebrew and Yiddish. A writer of social criticism, sympathetic to the labor movement, Peretz wrote stories, folk tales and plays. Liptzin characterizes him as both a realist – "an optimist who believed in the inevitability of progress through enlightenment" – and a romanticist, who "delved into irrational layers of the soul and sought to set imaginations astir with visions of Messianic possibilities." While most Jewish intellectuals were unrestrained in their support of the Russian Revolution of 1905, Peretz's view was more reserved, focusing more on the pogroms that took place within the Revolution, and concerned that the Revolution's universalist ideals would leave little space for Jewish non-conformism.

Some of Peretz's most notable works are Oyb Nisht Nokh Hekher ("If not Higher") and the short story "Bontshe Shvayg" ("Bontsche the Silent"). "Bontsche" is the story of a meek and modest man, downtrodden, abused and neglected during his life on earth, but exalted by the angels when he arrives in heaven because he never complained, fought back, or protested the treatment he was subjected to while still alive. As his reward for his long-suffering life without any complaint, the angels offer him anything at all that is in their power to give him. While the angels expected him to ask for something profound such as the arrival of the messiah and/or the redemption, which they would have granted him, instead all his abused and downtrodden imagination can muster is to ask for "a warm roll with a little bit of butter every morning." The angels are shocked and saddened, but the prosecutor laughs. There is no ambiguity here. The ending is a critique, considered by some critics as powerful and shocking on what Peretz considered the misguided Jewish elevation as an ideal to accept stoically every blow, persecution, injustice and deprivation that has been the fate of the Jews since their exile from their homeland in the 1st and 2nd centuries CE. It is a powerful call to the Jews to get up out of the gutter and realize they can take their lives and future into their own hands and imagine a better life.

His work Der Kuntsenmakher ("The Magician") found inspiration in the folklore of Hasidic Judaism. The story focuses on Elijah, who anonymously visits a poor couple and helps to make them rich. The 1917 edition was illustrated by Marc Chagall, who did not know Peretz and did not read the work until he was commissioned to create the drawings.

Much as Jacob Gordin influenced Yiddish theater in New York City in a more serious direction, so did Peretz in Eastern Europe. Israil Bercovici sees Peretz's works for the stage as a synthesis of Gordin and of the more traditional and melodramatic Abraham Goldfaden, an opinion which Peretz himself apparently would not have rejected: "The critics", he wrote, "the worst of them thought that M.M. Seforim was my model. This is not true. My teacher was Abraham Goldfaden."

Peretz's 1907 play Bay nakht afn altn mark ("At Night in the Old Marketplace"), set in a Jewish shtetl over the course of a single night, presents a panoramic review of Jewish life in Poland. The play was adapted into a multimedia theatrical presentation, with music by Frank London and book and lyrics by Glen Berger, in 2007.

== Family and descendants ==
The American journalist Martin Peretz is one of his descendants. The French author Georges Perec was a distant relative. Descendants of Peretz's brother – including physicians, teachers, attorneys, and performers – reside in the Tri-state area of New York City.

== Commemoration ==
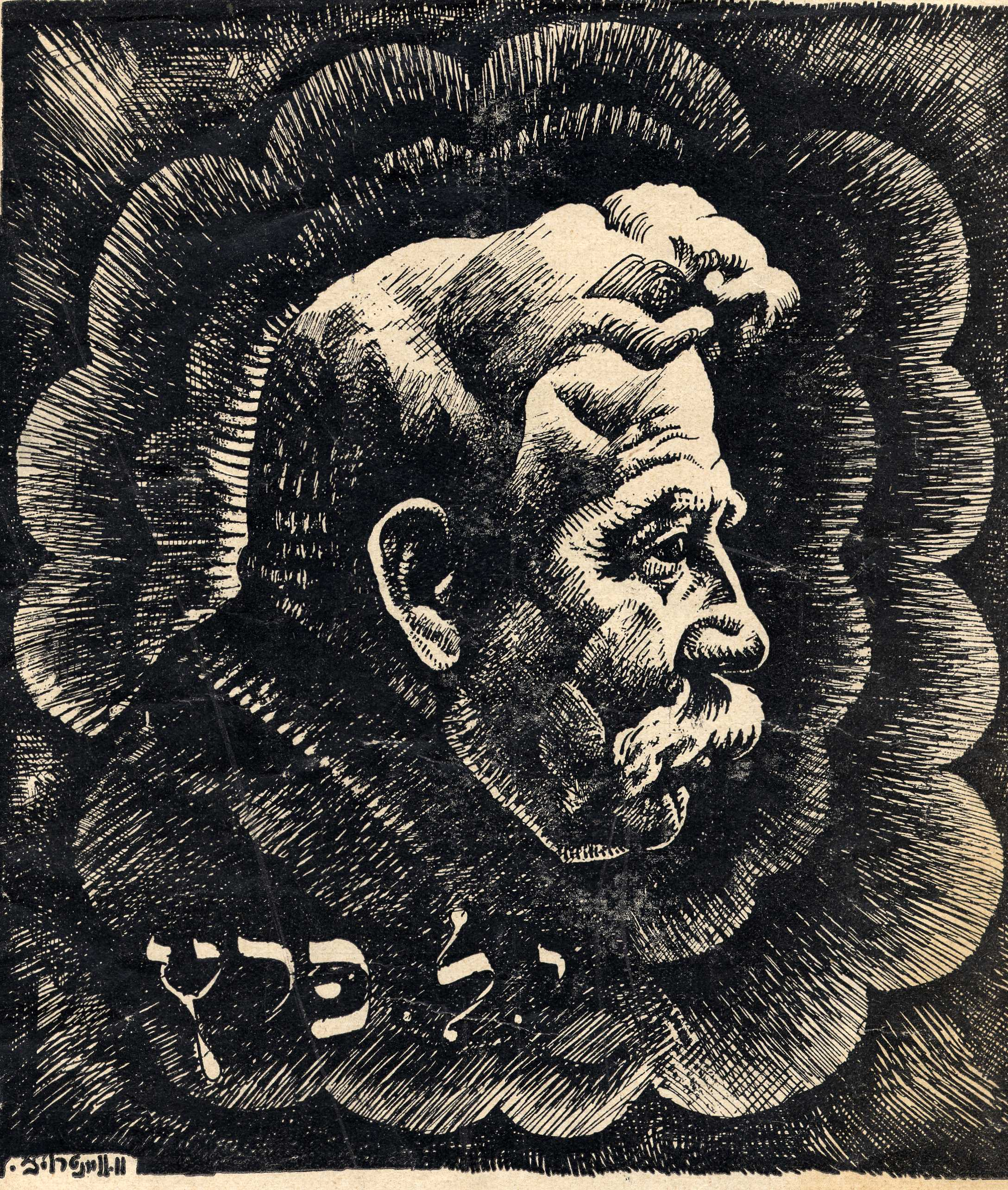
Peretz by Władysław Wajntraub

Peretz Square in Lower Manhattan, which marks the spot where Houston Street, First Avenue, and First Street meet, is named after him. It was dedicated on November 23, 1952.

There are streets in Warsaw, in Zamość, in Kutno and in Wrocław (also a square) named after him (ulica Icchaka Lejba Pereca in Polish).

There are streets named after Peretz in Israel in multiple cities: Tel Aviv, Hod Hasharon, Bat Yam, Haifa, Kiryat Yam, Holon, Givat Shmuel.
