= Bab Ballads =

Collection of light verse by W. S. Gilbert

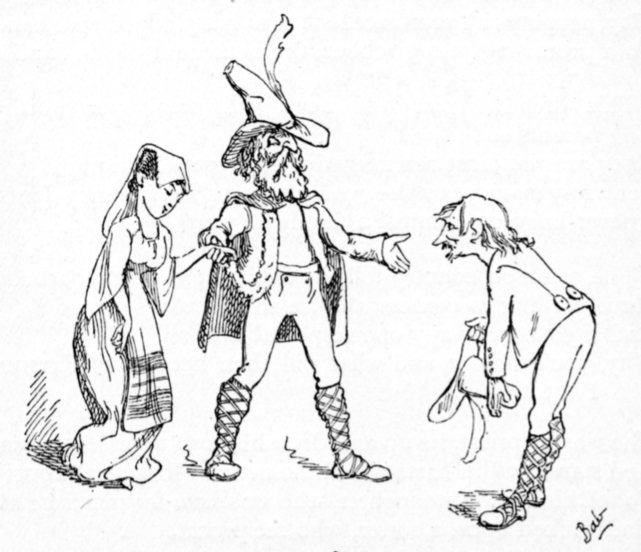
One of Gilbert's illustrations for "Gentle Alice Brown"

The Bab Ballads is a collection of light verse by W. S. Gilbert (1836–1911), illustrated with his own comic drawings. The poems take their name from Gilbert's childhood nickname. He later began to sign his illustrations "Bab". In writing these verses Gilbert developed his "topsy-turvy" style in which the humour is derived by setting up a ridiculous premise and working out its logical consequences, however absurd. The ballads also reveal Gilbert's cynical and satirical approach to humour. Gilbert wrote most of the "ballads", and first published a collection of them in book form, before he became famous for his comic opera librettos written in collaboration with the composer Arthur Sullivan.

The Bab Ballads became famous on their own, as well as being a source for plot elements, characters and songs that Gilbert recycled in the Gilbert and Sullivan operas. They were read aloud at private dinner-parties, at public banquets and even in the House of Lords. The ballads have been much published, and some have been recorded or otherwise adapted.

== Early history ==
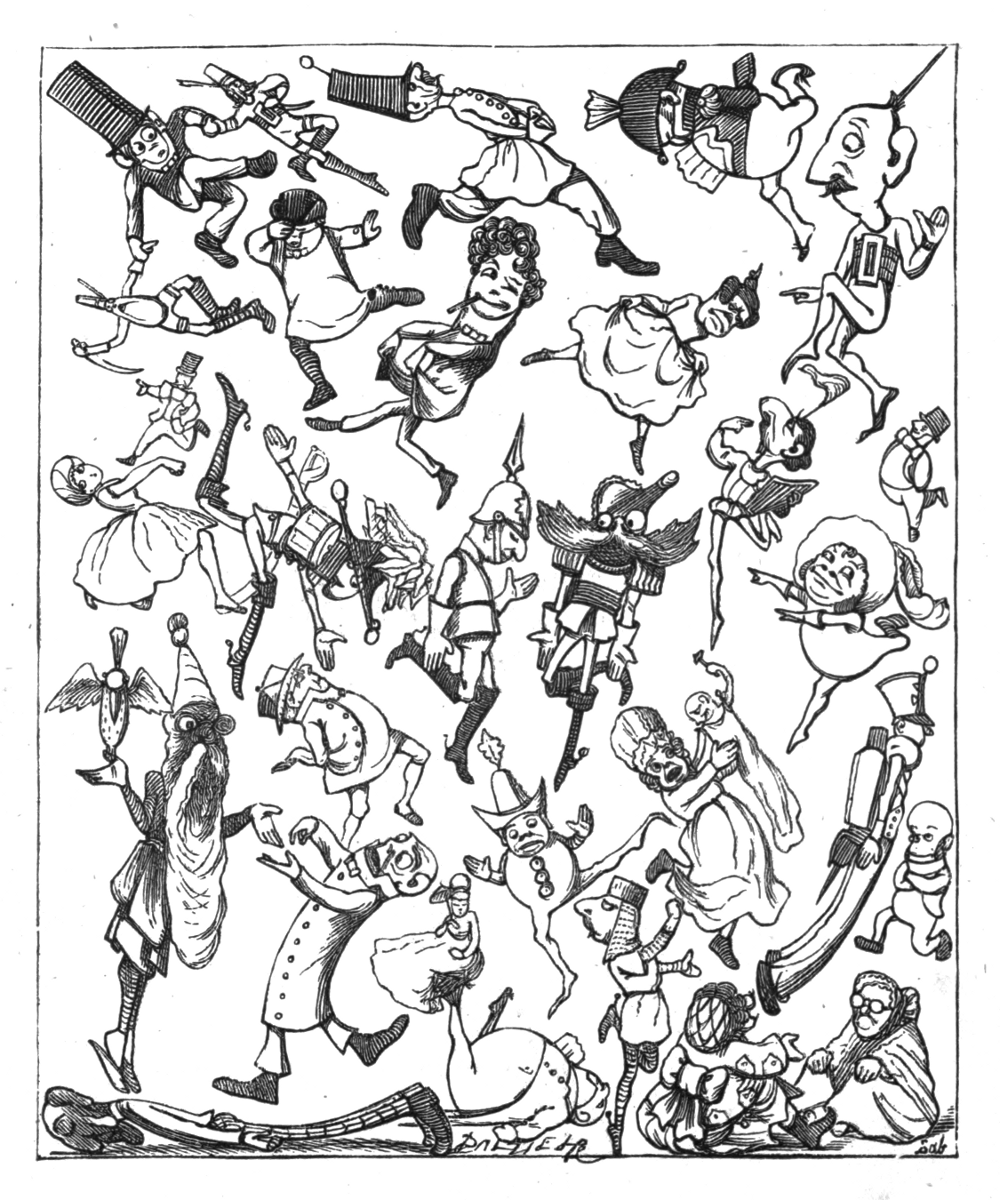
Frontispiece of The Bab Ballads, 1868

Gilbert explained how The Bab Ballads came about:

In 1861 the magazine Fun was started under the editorship of Mr. H. J. Byron. With much labour I turned out an article three-quarters of a column long, and sent it to the editor, together with a half-page drawing on wood. A day or two later the printer of the paper called upon me, with Mr Byron's compliments, and staggered me with a request to contribute a column of "copy" and a half-page drawing every week for the term of my natural life. I hardly knew how to treat the offer, for it seemed to me that into that short article I had poured all I knew. I was empty. I had exhausted myself: I didn't know any more. However, the printer encouraged me (with Mr. Byron's compliments), and I said I would try. I did try, and I found to my surprise that there was a little left, and enough indeed to enable me to contribute some hundreds of columns to the periodical throughout his editorship, and that of his successor, poor Tom Hood!

For ten years Gilbert wrote articles and poems for Fun, of which he was also the drama critic. Gilbert's first column "cannot now be identified". The first known contribution is a drawing titled "Some mistake here" on page 56 of the issue for 26 October 1861. Some of Gilbert's early work for the journal remains unidentified because many pieces were unsigned. The earliest pieces that Gilbert himself considered worthy to be collected in The Bab Ballads started to appear in 1865, and then much more steadily from 1866 to 1869.

The series takes its title from the nickname "Bab", which is short for "baby". It may also be a homage to Charles Dickens's pen name "Boz". Gilbert did not start signing his drawings "Bab" regularly until 1866, and he did not start calling the poems "Bab Ballads" until the first collected edition was published in 1869. From then on his new poems in Fun were captioned "The Bab Ballads".

Gilbert also started numbering the poems, with "Mister William" (published 6 February 1869) as No. 60. However, it is not certain which poems Gilbert considered to be Nos. 1–59. Ellis counts backwards, including only those poems with drawings, and finds that the first Bab Ballad was "The Story of Gentle Archibald". However, Gilbert did not include "Gentle Archibald" in his collected editions, while he did include several poems published earlier than that. Nor did Gilbert limit the collected editions to poems with illustrations.

By 1870 Gilbert's output of Bab Ballads had started to tail off considerably, corresponding to his rising success as a dramatist. The last poem that Gilbert himself considered to be a Bab Ballad, "Old Paul and Old Tim", appeared in Fun in January 1871. In the remaining forty years of his life Gilbert made only a handful of verse contributions to periodicals. Some posthumous editions of The Bab Ballads have included these later poems, although Gilbert did not.

== Subsequent publication ==
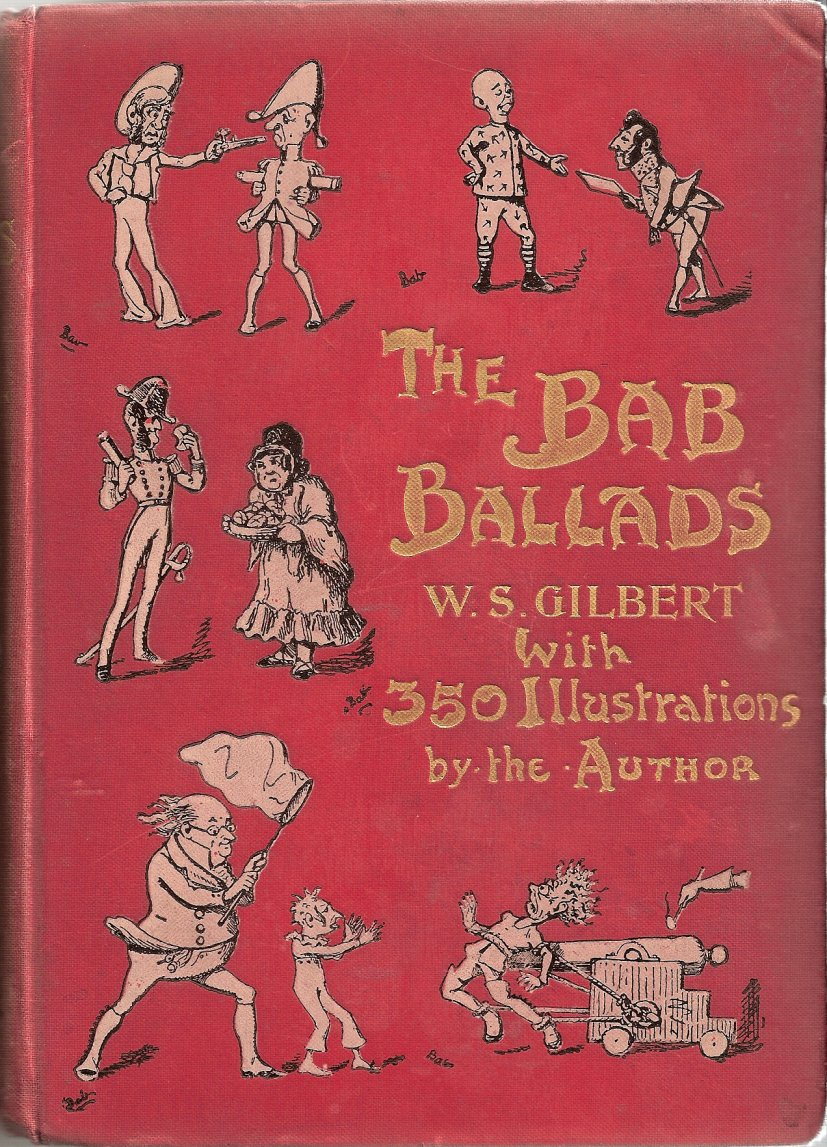
1898 edition of The Bab Ballads, with which are included Songs of a Savoyard

By 1868 Gilbert's poems had won sufficient popularity to justify a collected edition. He selected forty-four of the poems (thirty-four of them illustrated) for an edition of The "Bab" Ballads – Much Sound and Little Sense. A second collected edition, More "Bab" Ballads, including thirty-five ballads (all illustrated), appeared in 1872. In 1876 Gilbert collected fifty of his favourite poems in Fifty "Bab" Ballads, with one poem being collected for the first time ("Etiquette") and twenty-five poems that had appeared in the earlier volumes being left out. Gilbert said:

The period during which they were written extended over some three or four years; many, however, were composed hastily, and under the discomforting necessity of having to turn out a quantity of lively verse by a certain day in every week. As it seemed to me (and to others) that the volumes were disfigured by the presence of these hastily written impostors, I thought it better to withdraw from both volumes such Ballads as seemed to show evidence of carelessness or undue haste, and to publish the remainder in the compact form under which they are now presented to the reader.

Gilbert's readers were not happy with the loss, and in 1882 Gilbert published all of the poems that had appeared in either The "Bab" Ballads or More "Bab" Ballads, once again excluding "Etiquette". Some twentieth-century editions of More "Bab" Ballads include "Etiquette". In 1890 Gilbert produced Songs of a Savoyard, a volume of sixty-nine detached lyrics from the Savoy Operas, each with a new title, and some of them slightly reworded to fit the changed context. Many of them also received "Bab" illustrations in the familiar style. He also included two deleted lyrics from Iolanthe (footnoted as "omitted in representation"). The effect was that of a new volume of "Bab Ballads". Indeed, Gilbert considered calling the volume The Savoy Ballads.

Finally, in 1898 Gilbert produced The Bab Ballads, with which are included Songs of a Savoyard. This volume included all of the Bab Ballads that had appeared in any of the earlier collected volumes, the sixty-nine "Songs of a Savoyard" published in 1890, and eighteen additional lyrics in the same format, taken from the four operas he had written since then. The Bab Ballads and the illustrated opera lyrics alternated, creating the impression of one integrated body of work. Gilbert also added more than two hundred new drawings, providing illustrations for the ten ballads that had previously lacked them, and replacing most of the others. He wrote:

I have always felt that many of the original illustrations to The Bab Ballads erred gravely in the direction of unnecessary extravagance. This defect I have endeavoured to correct through the medium of the two hundred new drawings which I have designed for this volume. I am afraid I cannot claim for them any other recommendation.

It was in this form that The Bab Ballads remained almost constantly in print until the expiration of the copyright at the end of 1961. James Ellis's new edition in 1970 restored the original drawings, retaining from the edition of 1898 only those drawings that went with the previously unillustrated ballads.

== Identification and attribution ==
There is no universally agreed list of poems that constitute The Bab Ballads. The series clearly includes all the poems that Gilbert himself published under that title, but there are others he did not include in any of the collected editions published in his lifetime. Most writers have accepted as Bab Ballads any poems, whether illustrated or not, that Gilbert contributed to periodicals, not counting poems written or repurposed as operatic lyrics.

After Gilbert's death there were several attempts to identify additional ballads that were missing from the collected editions that had been published to that point. Dark & Gray (1923), Goldberg (1929), and Searle (1932) identified and published additional ballads, not all of which have been accepted into the canon. A 1970 edition edited by James Ellis includes all the poems that Gilbert himself acknowledged, all the poems from Dark & Gray, Goldberg, and/or Searle that Ellis finds authentic, and others identified by no other previous compilers. There are several ballads that Ellis identifies as Gilbert's either on stylistic grounds or by the presence of a "Bab" illustration accompanying the poem in the original publication. These include two distinct poems called "The Cattle Show", as well as "Sixty-Three and Sixty-Four", "The Dream", "The Baron Klopfzetterheim" and "Down to the Derby". These attributions are provisional and have not been accepted by all scholars because the poems themselves are unsigned, and Gilbert sometimes provided illustrations for the work of other writers. Starting with the "new series" of Fun (those with 'n.s.' in the source reference), Gilbert's authorship is not in doubt, as the pieces for which he was paid can be confirmed from the proprietors' copies of that journal, which now reside in the Huntington Library.

A 2023 collection of 41 of the ballads, titled The Bab Ballads: A New Selection, was edited with an introduction by Andrew Crowther, secretary of the W. S. Gilbert Society.

== List of Bab Ballads ==
The table below lists all the Bab Ballads that are included in James Ellis's edition of 1970. The second column shows the reference for the periodical in which each poem originally appeared and the third column shows the collection(s) that have included the poem. The following abbreviations are used:

- TBB: The "Bab" Ballads (London: John Camden Hotten, 1868)
- MBB: More "Bab" Ballads (London: Routledge, 1872)
- 50BB: Fifty "Bab" Ballads ((London: Routledge, 1876)
- D&G: W.S. Gilbert: His Life and Letters, Sidney Dark & Rowland Grey (Methuen, 1923)
- Goldberg: Story of Gilbert and Sullivan, Isaac Goldberg (John Murray, 1929)
- Searle: Lost Bab Ballads, Townley Searle (G. P. Putnam's Sons, Ltd. 1932)
- Ellis: The Bab Ballads, James Ellis, ed. (Belknap Press, 1970)

Starting with "Mister William" Gilbert assigned numbers to most of the ballads that appeared in Fun. Those numbers are shown in the second column after the source reference.

| Ballad title | Original source reference | Collections |
|---|---|---|
| The Advent of Spring | Fun, II (1 February 1862), 200. | Ellis |
| The Cattle Show | Fun, V (12 December 1863), 121. | Searle, Ellis |
| The Cattle Show | The Comic News, I (19 December 1863), 180. | Ellis |
| Sixty-Three and Sixty-Four | Fun, V (2 January 1864), 162. | Ellis |
| The Dream | Fun, V (27 February 1864), 242. | Goldberg, Ellis |
| The Baron Klopfzetterheim | Fun, VI (19, 26 March.; 2, 9, 16 April 1864), 8–9, 18, 21, 38, 48. | Searle, Ellis |
| Down to the Derby | Fun, VI (28 May 1864), 110, 111. | D&G, Searle, Ellis |
| Something Like Nonsense Verses | Fun, n.s., I (10, 24 June 1865), 31, 51. | Ellis |
| Ode to my Clothes | Fun, n.s., I (10 June 1865), 33. | Ellis |
| The Student | Fun, n.s., I (1 July 1865), 67. | Ellis |
| Tempora Mutantur | Fun, n.s., I (15 July 1865), 82. | TBB, Ellis |
| The Bachelors' Strike | Fun, n.s., I (22 July 1865), 99. | Ellis |
| A Bad Night Of It | Fun, n.s., I (19 August 1865), 139. | Ellis |
| To Phœbe | Fun, n.s., I (26 August 1865), 144. | TBB, 50BB, Ellis |
| Ozone | Fun, n.s., II (16 September 1865), 2. | Ellis |
| To the Terrestrial Globe | Fun, n.s., II (30 September 1865), 29. | TBB, 50BB, Ellis |
| The Monkey in Trouble | Fun, n.s., II (7 October 1865), 31. | Ellis |
| Back Again! | Fun, n.s., II (7 October 1865), 39. | Ellis |
| To My Absent Husband | Punch, XLIX (14 October 1865), 151. | Goldberg, Searle, Ellis |
| My Return | Punch, XLIX (21 October 1865), 153. | Ellis |
| Musings in a Music Hall | Fun, n.s., II (28 October 1865), 69. | D&G, Ellis |
| Pantomimic Presentiments | Fun, n.s., II (2 December 1865), 111. | Ellis |
| The Bar and its Moaning | Fun, n.s., II (9 December 1865), 122. | Ellis |
| To Euphrosyne | Fun, n.s., II (23 December 1865), 150. | Ellis |
| The Phantom Curate | Fun, n.s., II (6 January 1866), 162. | TBB, 50BB, Ellis |
| To a Little Maid | Fun, n.s., II (6 January 1866), 167. | Ellis, TBB, 50BB |
| Ferdinando and Elvira | Fun, n.s., II (17 February 1866), 229. | TBB, 50BB, Ellis |
| The Pantomime "Super" to His Mask | Fun, n.s., II (24 February 1866), 238. | TBB, 50BB, Ellis |
| The Yarn of The "Nancy Bell" | Fun, n.s., II (3 March 1866), 242–243. | TBB, 50BB, Ellis |
| Monsieur le Blond on London | Fun, n.s., II (3 March 1866), 249. | Ellis |
| Haunted | Fun, n.s., III (24 March 1866), 12. | TBB, 50BB, Ellis |
| The Reverend Rawston Wright | Fun, n.s., III (28 April 1866), 67. | Searle, Ellis |
| The Story of Gentle Archibald | Fun, n.s., III (19 May 1866), 100–101. | D&G, Searle, Ellis |
| To My Bride | Fun, n.s., III (9 June 1866), 125. | TBB, 50BB, Ellis |
| Only a Dancing Girl | Fun, n.s., III (23 June 1866), 146. | TBB, 50BB, Ellis |
| To My Steed | Fun, n.s., III (23 June 1866), 152. | Ellis |
| King Borria Bungalee Boo | Fun, n.s., III (7 July 1866), 167. | TBB, 50BB, Ellis |
| Jack Casts His Shell | Fun, n.s., IV (6 October 1866), 37. | Ellis |
| How to Write an Irish Drama | Fun, n.s., IV (1 December 1866), 127. | Ellis |
| General John | Fun, n.s., V (1 June 1867), 127. | TBB, Ellis |
| Sir Guy the Crusader | Fun, n.s., V (8 June 1867), 139. | TBB, Ellis |
| Sir Galahad the Golumptious | Fun, n.s., V (15 June 1867), 149. | Ellis |
| Disillusioned | Fun, n.s., V (6 July 1867), 173. | TBB, Ellis |
| John and Freddy | Fun, n.s., V (3 August 1867), 222. | TBB, Ellis |
| Lorenzo de Lardy | Fun, n.s., V (10 August 1867), 225. | TBB, Ellis |
| The Bishop and the Busman | Fun, n.s., V (17 August 1867), 238. | TBB, Ellis |
| Babette's Love | Fun, n.s., V (24 August 1867), 247. | TBB, Ellis |
| Fanny and Jenny | Fun, n.s., V (7 September 1867), 269. | D&G, Searle, Ellis |
| Sir Macklin | Fun, n.s., VI (14 September 1867), 6–7. | TBB, 50BB, Ellis |
| The Troubadour | Fun, n.s., VI (21 September 1867), 15. | TBB, 50BB, Ellis |
| Ben Allah Achmet | Fun, n.s., VI (28 September 1867), 25. | TBB, Ellis |
| The Folly of Brown | Fun, n.s., VI (5 October 1867), 35. | TBB, Ellis |
| Joe Golightly | Fun, n.s., VI (12 October 1867), 54. | TBB, Ellis |
| The Rival Curates | Fun, n.s., VI (19 October 1867), 57. | TBB, 50BB, Ellis |
| Thomas Winterbottom Hance | Fun, n.s., VI (26 October 1867), 74–75. | TBB, 50BB, Ellis |
| A. and B.; OR, The Sensation Twins | Fun, n.s., VI (2 November 1867), 77. | Goldberg, Searle, Ellis |
| Sea-Side Snobs | Fun, n.s., VI (9 November 1867), 88. | Searle, Ellis |
| The Bishop of Rum-ti-Foo | Fun, n.s., VI (16 November 1867), 104. | TBB, 50BB, Ellis |
| The Precocious Baby | Fun, n.s., VI (23 November 1867), 113. | TBB, 50BB, Ellis |
| Baines Carew, Gentleman | Fun, n.s., VI (30 November 1867), 124. | TBB, 50BB, Ellis |
| A Discontented Sugar Broker | Fun, n.s., VI (14 December 1867), 137. | TBB, 50BB, Ellis |
| The Force of Argument | Fun, n.s., VI (21 December 1867), 149. | TBB, Ellis |
| At A Pantomime | Fun, n.s., VI (28 December 1867), 165. | TBB, 50BB, Ellis |
| The Three Kings of Chickeraboo | Fun, n.s., VI (18 January 1868), 191. | TBB, Ellis |
| The Periwinkle Girl | Fun, n.s., VI (1 February 1868), 211. | TBB, Ellis |
| Captain Reece | Fun, n.s., VI (8 February 1868), 221. | TBB, 50BB, Ellis |
| Thomson Green and Harriet Hale | Fun, n.s., VI (15 February 1868), 242. | TBB, Ellis |
| Bob Polter | Fun, n.s., VI (29 February 1868), 260–261. | TBB, 50BB, Ellis |
| The Ghost, the Gallant, the Gael, and the Goblin | Fun, n.s., VII (14 March 1868), 6. | TBB, 50BB, Ellis |
| Ellen McJones Aberdeen | Fun, n.s., VII (21 March 1868), 16. | TBB, 50BB, Ellis |
| The Sensation Captain | Fun, n.s., VII 4 April 1868), 43. | TBB, Ellis |
| Trial by Jury | Fun, n.s., VII (11 April 1868), 54. | Ellis |
| The Reverend Micah Sowls | Fun, n.s., VII (18 April 1868), 65. | TBB, Ellis |
| Peter the Wag | Fun, n.s., VII (25 April 1868), 75. | TBB, 50BB, Ellis |
| The Story of Prince Agib | Fun, n.s., VII (16 May 1868), 107. | TBB, 50BB, Ellis |
| Gentle Alice Brown | Fun, n.s., VII (23 May 1868), 111. | TBB, 50BB, Ellis |
| Pasha Bailey Ben | Fun, n.s., VII (6 June 1868), 133. | MBB |
| Blabworth-cum-Talkington | Fun, n.s., VII (20 June 1868), 153. | Goldberg, Searle, Ellis |
| The Sailor Boy To His Lass | Fun, n.s., VII (27 June 1868), 163, | MBB, 50BB, Ellis |
| Sir Conrad and the Rusty One | Fun, n.s., VII (4 July 1868), 174. | D&G, Searle, Ellis |
| The Cunning Woman | Fun, n.s., VII (25 July 1868), 205. | MBB, Ellis |
| The Modest Couple | Fun, n.s., VII (8 August 1868), 225. | MBB, Ellis |
| The "Bandoline" Player | Fun, n.s., VII (22 August 1868), 246. | D&G, Searle, Ellis |
| Sir Barnaby Bampton Boo | Fun, n.s., VII (29 August 1868), 255. | MBB, Ellis |
| Boulogne | Fun, n.s., VIII (12 September 1868), 7. | Searle, Ellis |
| Brave Alum Bey | Fun, n.s., VIII (19 September 1868), 16. | MBB, Ellis |
| Gregory Parable, LL.D. | Fun, n.s., VIII (3 October 1868), 35. | MBB, Ellis |
| Lieutenant-Colonel Flare | Fun, n.s., VIII (10 October 1868), 46. | MBB, Ellis |
| The Hermit | Fun, n.s., VIII (17 October 1868), 62. | Goldberg, Searle, Ellis |
| Annie Protheroe | Fun, n.s., VIII (24 October 1868), 65. | MBB, 50BB, Ellis |
| The Captain and the Mermaids | Fun, n.s., VIII (7 November 1868), 85. | MBB, 50BB, Ellis |
| An Unfortunate Likeness | Fun, n.s., VIII (14 November 1868), 96. | MBB, 50BB |
| A Boulogne Table d'Hôte | Tom Hood's Comic Annual for 1868 (London: Fun office, 1868), 78. | Searle, Ellis |
| The Railway Guard's Song | Tom Hood's Comic Annual for 1868 (London: Fun office, 1868), 79. | Ellis |
| The Undecided Man | Tom Hood's Comic Annual for 1868, (London: Fun office, 1868) 79. | Searle, Ellis |
| Premonitory Symptoms | Fun, n.s., VIII (28 November 1868), 117. | Ellis |
| Lost Mr. Blake | Fun, n.s., VIII (28 November 1868), 121. | MBB, 50BB, Ellis |
| Little Oliver | Fun, n.s., VIII (5 December 1868), 132. | MBB, Ellis |
| What Is A Burlesque? | Belgravia Annual, ed. M. E. Braddon (London, 1868), 106–107. | Ellis |
| The Phantom Head | Fun, n.s., VIII (19 December 1868), 151. | Goldberg, Searle, Ellis |
| The Politest of Nations! | Fun, n.s., VIII (2 January 1869), 173. | Ellis |
| Woman's Gratitude | Fun, n.s., VIII (9 January 1869 ), 176–177. | Goldberg, Searle, Ellis |
| The Baby's Vengeance | Fun, n.s., VIII (16 January 1869), 188. | MBB, 50BB, Ellis |
| The Two Ogres | Fun, n.s., VIII (23 January 1869), 204. | MBB, Ellis |
| Mister William | Fun, n.s., VIII (6 February 1869), 218. No. 60. | MBB, 50BB, Ellis |
| The Martinet | Fun, n.s., VIII (13 February 1869), 228. No. 61. | MBB, 50BB, Ellis |
| The King of Canoodle-Dum | Fun, n.s., VIII (20 February 1869), 238–239. No. 62. | MBB, 50BB, Ellis |
| First Love | Fun, n.s., VIII (27 February 1869), 248. No. 63. | MBB, Ellis |
| The Haughty Actor | Fun, n.s., IX (27 March 1869), 31. No. 64. | MBB, 50BB, Ellis |
| The Two Majors | Fun, n.s., IX (3 April 1869), 41. No. 65. | MBB, 50BB, Ellis |
| The Three Bohemian Ones | Fun, n.s., IX (10 April 1869), 51. No. 66. | D&G, Searle, Ellis |
| The Policeman's Beard | Fun, n.s., IX (1 May 1869), 75. No. 67. | Goldberg, Searle, Ellis |
| The Bishop of Rum-ti-Foo Again | Fun, n.s., IX (8 May 1869), 85. No. 68. | MBB, 50BB, Ellis |
| A Worm Will Turn | Fun, n.s., IX (15 May 1869), 104. No. 69. | MBB, Ellis |
| The Mystic Selvagee | Fun, n.s., IX (22 May 1869), 112. No. 70. | MBB, 50BB, Ellis |
| Emily, John, James, and I | Fun, n.s., IX (29 May 1869), 115. No. 71. | MBB, 50BB, Ellis |
| The Ghost to his Ladye Love | Fun, n.s., IX (14 August 1869), 223. | Ellis |
| Prince Il Baleine | Fun, n.s., IX (28 August 1869), 253. No. 72. | D&G, Searle, Ellis |
| The Way of Wooing | Fun, n.s., X (11 September 1869), 13. No. 73. | MBB, 50BB, Ellis |
| The Scornful Colonel | Fun, n.s., X (25 September 1869), 31. No. 74. | Goldberg, Searle, Ellis |
| The Variable Baby | Fun, n.s., X (9 October 1869), 51. No. 75. | Goldberg, Searle, Ellis |
| The Ladies of the Lea | Fun, n.s., X (30 October 1869), 75. No. 76. | Goldberg, Searle, Ellis |
| Hongree and Mahry | Fun, n.s., X (20 November 1869), 105. No. 77. | MBB, 50BB, Ellis |
| Etiquette | The Graphic, I (25 December 1869, Christmas Number), 6–7. | 50BB, Ellis |
| The Reverend Simon Magnus | Fun, n.s., X (5 February 1870), 215. No. 78. | MBB, 50BB, Ellis |
| My Dream | Fun, n.s., XI (19 March 1870), 15. No. 79. | MBB, 50BB, Ellis |
| Damon v. Pythias | Fun, n.s., XI (26 March 1870), 31. No. 80. | MBB, Ellis |
| The Bumboat Woman's Story | Fun, n.s., XI (9 April 1870), 45. No. 81. | MBB, 50BB, Ellis |
| The Fairy Curate | Fun, n.s., XII (23 July 1870), 32–33. No. 82. | MBB, 50BB, Ellis |
| Phrenology | Fun, n.s., XII (6 August 1870), 45. No. 83. | MBB, 50BB, Ellis |
| The Perils of Invisibility | Fun, n.s., XII (20 August 1870), 65. No. 84. | MBB, 50BB, Ellis |
| The Wise Policeman | Fun, n.s., XII (22 October 1870), 156. No. 85. | Ellis |
| A Drop of Pantomime Water | The Graphic, II, 25 December 1870, Christmas Number, 20. | Ellis |
| Old Paul and Old Tim | Fun, n.s., XIII (28 January 1871), 35. No. 86. | MBB, Ellis |
| "Eheu! Fugaces" | The Dark Blue, III (April 1872), 142–143. | Searle, Ellis |
| Jester James | Time, I (April 1879), 54–57. | Ellis |
| The Policeman's Story | Time, I (May 1879), 166–168. | Ellis |
| The Thief's Apology | Illustrated Sporting and Dramatic News, XXII (6 December 1884), "Holly Leaves" (Christmas number), 267. | Ellis |
| The King and the Stroller | The Queen's Christmas Carol: An Anthology of Poems, Stories, Essays, Drawings and Music by British Authors, Artists and Composers (London: The Daily Mail, 1905), 80–81. | Ellis |

== Adaptations ==
Some of the Bab Ballads have been recorded by several performers, including Stanley Holloway (1959) Redvers Kyle (1963) and Jim Broadbent (1999). In 2016, The W. S. Gilbert Society released a 2-CD set read by various British performers, including several who performed with the D'Oyly Carte Opera Company.

Four have been set to music by Ken Malucelli, and two have been adapted for the stage by Brian Mitchell and Joseph Nixon.

== See also ==
- Pineapple Poll, ballet based on "The Bumboat Woman's Story"
