= Dog king (disambiguation) =

The dog king is a Scandinavian tradition.

Dog King or King of Dogs may also refer to:

- Inu-Oh, 2021 Japanese animated film by Masaaki Yuasa
- The Dog King a 1995 novel by the Austrian writer Christoph Ransmayr
- King of Dogs, adaptation of the play Mottke the Thief by Sholem Asch
