= Mottke the Thief =

1915 noven by Sholem Ash

Mottke the Thief or Motke Thief (Yiddish: מאטקע גנב, romanized: Motke ganev) (Note: Mottke/Motke is a diminutive for Mordecai.) is a 1915 work by Sholem Asch, a picaresque novel about the exploits of the protagonist. The novel was first printed serialized in Forverts, in 1915, published as a book by Forverts in 1916, and made into a play in 1917. (Note: מאטקע גנב : א פאלקשטיק אין דריי אקטן מיט א פראלאג, Moṭḳe Ganev a folḳshṭiḳ in dray aḳṭn miṭ a prolog)

It is a "coming of age"-type story of Motke following him from his chldhood poverty and neglect in a shtetl to the Jewish criminal underworld of Warsaw, "of brothels and murky cafes, prostitutes and gangsters, extortion and murder".

== Translations and adaptations ==
- Translated as Mottke the Vagabond by Isaac Goldberg, 1917
- Translated as Mottke the Thief by Willa Muir and Edwin Muir, 1935
- Translated as Motke Thief by Caraid O'Brien, 2005, republished in O'Brien's Underworld Trilogy of Sholem Asch's works, 2023
- Adapted into the German opera Mottke der Dieb by Bernd Franke and libretto by Jonathan Moore
- מלך הקלבים, Melech haKlavim, 'King of Dogs', a 2017 play by Yoav Shutan-Goshen and Irad Rubinstain, Beit Lessin Theater, based on Motke Ganev. In 2018 the play was nominated in 10 categories for the Israel Theater Prize and won three of them: director of the year: Irad Rubinstain, most promising actor of the year: Ofri Bitterman, stage design: Svetlana Berger.
- Russian translation: Мотке - вор, Motke - vor, Berlin, I.P.Ladyschnikoff (Иван Павлович Ладыжников) Publishing House, 1924

== See also ==
- Moshkeleh the Thief by Sholem Aleichem, another novel about Jewish underclass
