= Virginia MacFadyen =

American actor and novelist

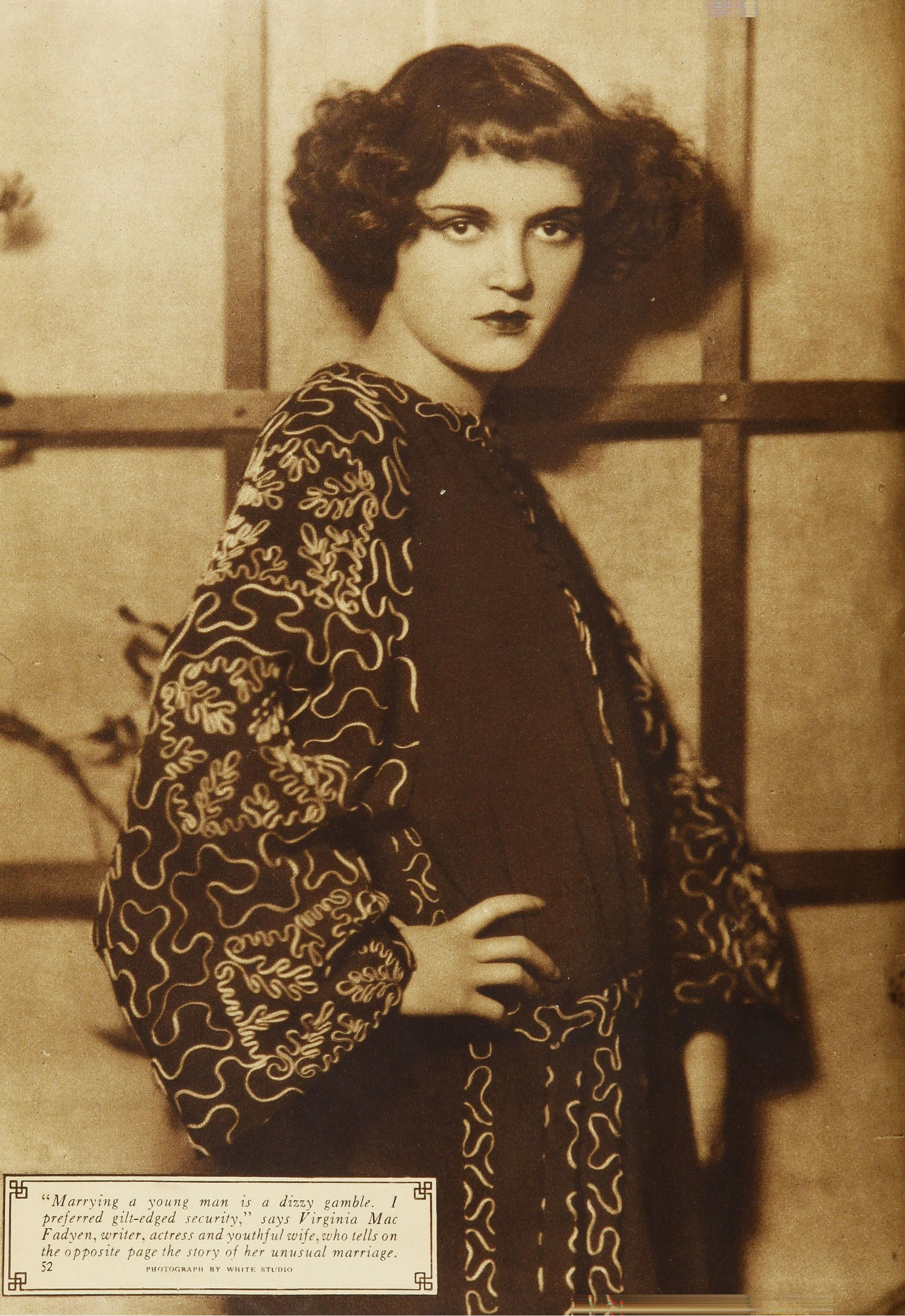
- Born: January 3, 1900
- Died: July 7, 1966; Waynesville
- Occupations: Actor, writer
- Spouse: Edwin Björkman

Virginia Hendon MacFadyen (January 3, 1900 – July 7, 1966) was an American actor and novelist.

Virginia MacFadyen was born on January 3, 1900 in North Carolina. She graduated from the University of North Carolina in 1919.

Virginia MacFadyen starred as Rivkele in the English translation of Sholom Asch's controversial Yiddish stage drama, God of Vengeance. It was staged in New York City at the Provincetown Theatre in Greenwich Village in 1922, and it moved to the Apollo Theatre on Broadway on February 19, 1923. Rivkele is the daughter of a brothel owner, and she later begins a lesbian relationship with a prostitute. The entire cast, including MacFadyen, were indicted and convicted for obscenity and the cast received suspended sentences.

She also appeared as Delia in The Wonderful Visit, which premiered at the Lenox Hill Theatre on February 12, 1924. The play, by H. G. Wells and St. John Ervine, was an adaptation of Wells' satirical fantasy novel of the same name.

MacFayden published three novels, including At the Sign of the Sun (1925), about an antediluvian lost race.

Virginia MacFadyen died on 7 July 1966 in Waynesville, North Carolina.

== Personal life ==
She married Swedish author Edwin Björkman in 1921. She married New York broker Frank B. Hall, Jr. in 1926.

== Bibliography ==
- Windows Facing West (New York: Albert and Charles Boni, 1924)
- At the Sign of the Sun (New York: Albert and Charles Boni, 1925)
- Bittern Point (New York: Albert and Charles Boni, 1926)
