= Moshkeleh the Thief =

1903 novel by Sholem Aleichem

Moshkeleh the Thief (Yiddish: מאָשקעלע גאַנעוו, romanized: Moshkele ganev) (Note: "Moshkele" is a diminutive of "Moses": ->Moshe->Moshke->Moshkele) is a novel by Sholem Aleichem. It is a story of a horse thief from the fictional shtetl of Mazepevke. In the novel Moshkeleh sets off to retrieve a daughter of the Mazepevke tavern keeper, who runs off with Russian liquor tax collector.

== Plot outline ==
Moshkele's father Jonah was a "prophet" by enterprise: he would tell where stolen horses are, for a fee. Jonah did not want his son to follow his path and put him into a cheder, but Moshkele was dreaming only of horses. Tzireleh, the youngest daughter of the Mazepevke tavern keeper Chaim ran away with a Gentile tax collector and hid in a monastery to be Christened in order to marry him. Chaim could not retrieve her from the monastery and asked Moshkele for help. Moshkele went to the monastery and said he wanted to repent and change his faith. Moshkele met Tzirele, fell madly in love with her, stole her from the monastery, and they married... A long time passed... A cantor Genach from Mazepevke recognizes Moshkele in a group of prisoners in shackles on their way to Irkutsk, followed by Tzirele with a little child, who asks Genach to pass a message to her family.

== Publication history ==
First it was serialized in Yiddish in a weekly in 1903. In 1913 it was for the first time published in a book form in Warsaw. In 1927 it was published by Kultur Lige in Kiev, Soviet Union, and in 1941 it was published in Moscow. It was not included into Sholem Aleichem's Collected Works. In 1972 it was translated in Russian by M. Dudinsky as "Мошкеле вор", published by Khudozhestvennaya Literatura, Moscow, in vol. 3 of the six-volume collection of Sholem Aleichhem's works. In 2021 it was translated into English by Curt Leviant as Moshkeleh the Thief with the subtitle "A Rediscovered Novel".

== Commentary ==
It was the first Sholom Aleichem's novel about Jewish underclass and probably the first literary presentation of Yiddish thieves' argot.

== See also ==
- Mottke the Thief by Sholem Asch, another novel about Jewish underclass
