= That's Not Funny, That's Sick =

Stage show and comedy album

- Written by: Eleanor Reissa; Wendy Goldman; Andrew Moses; Rodger Bumpass
- Music by: Michael Simmons and Slewfoot

Premiere
- Date: October 1977; 48 years ago
- Place: The Cellar Door (Washington, D.C.)

That's Not Funny, That's Sick, a spinoff of the humor magazine National Lampoon, was a 1977–1978 stage show and also a 1977 album of American sketch comedy.

== Stage show ==
The stage show was a revue, "a compilation of bits and pieces from two earlier National Lampoon Revues, National Lampoon Lemmings and The National Lampoon Show." Featuring Eleanor Reissa, Wendy Goldman, Andrew Moses, and Rodger Bumpass, it toured 45 states in 1977–1978. The show played at The Cellar Door in Washington, D.C., in October 1977; and at The Other End (a.k.a. The Bitter End) in New York City in December 1977.

Featuring themes of sharp social commentary, absurdity, and irreverence, the show focused on issues like drugs, environmental concerns (such as humpback whales), rock music, religion, and romantic relationships. Impressions and parodies of famous personalities included Dolly Parton (Reissa), Bob Dylan (Moses), James Taylor (Bumpass), John Denver, Joan Baez, Neil Young, and Diana Ross, as well as a rapid-fire parody of Rod McKuen's answering machine.

Highlights included a condensed, comedic adaptation of Moby-Dick, a spoof of Waiting for Godot, a "brief parody of the songs of the 1950s," an "exaltation of old Colorado," and an "examination of the racial balance in professional sports." The performers transitioned swiftly between skits, covering various scenarios such as an acid-tripped operating-room drama, a blues song about middle-class liberalism, a mock appeal for a "Stamp Out Jerry Lewis Fund," and a humorous sermon on God as a sales opportunity. Other sketches featured life in a singles bar, a confessional, a television pitch for a fictional "School of Dope-Dealing," and a satirical sportscast suggesting Olympic gymnastics should be X-rated.

The production was backed by an electric rockabilly group called Michael Simmons and Slewfoot.

=== Critical reception ===
The That's Not Funny, That's Sick revue received positive reviews from both The Washington Post and The New York Times, with both papers giving particular praise to Bumpass; the Times reviewer wrote, "Mr. Bumpass has a malleable face, a malleable voice, and, apparently, a malleable mind. Like all great comedians, he is basically an actor. Whatever surface effects he may use with that remarkable face and his collection of voices, they are logical extensions of the basic character that he is projecting."

== Album ==
That's Not Funny, That's Sick

Studio album by National Lampoon
- Released: 1977
- Genre: Comedy, parody
- Label: US: Label 21(original release) Uproar (2003 CD reissue); UK: Radar

National Lampoon chronology
Goodbye Pop 1952–1976 (1975)	That's Not Funny, That's Sick (1977)	Greatest Hits of the National Lampoon (1978)

Professional ratings
Review scores
Source	Rating
The Village Voice	B

The That's Not Funny, That's Sick album is a collection of sketches, several of which were taken from the National Lampoon Radio Hour, a radio show that was broadcast on 600 radio stations from late 1973 to the end of 1974. The That's Not Funny, That's Sick album was released on vinyl in 1977.

The sketches on That's Not Funny, That's Sick star John Belushi, Brian Doyle-Murray, Bill Murray, and Christopher Guest, and feature, among others, Richard Belzer. Writers included Doyle-Murray, Bill Murray, Guest, Belzer, John Weidman, Bob Tischler, Tony Hendra, Harold Ramis, Douglas Kenney, and Bruce McCall.

In 2003, the album was released on CD by Uproar Entertainment. In August 2020, a "digitally remastered" version was released on streaming services. The digital release shuffles the track order and omits one track, "Confession".

== Track listing ==
1. The Squalor Show
2. Confession
3. Dick Ballantine Phone Show #1 (Belzer)
4. Disco Hotline
5. Dick Ballantine Phone Show #2
6. Love Birds / Flashanova
7. Listener Sponsored Radio #1 (Bill Murray)
8. For $25,000
9. Gymnasty
10. Dick Ballantine Phone Show #3
11. Yiddishco
12. Listener Sponsored Radio #2
13. Pulp
14. For $15,000
15. Rapeline
16. Mr. Roberts #1 (Mr. Rogers parody with Guest and Bill Murray)
17. Stereos and Such
18. Listener Sponsored Radio #3
19. Height Report Disco (Bill Murray and Donna Detroit)
20. Mr. Roberts #2
21. Dial-A-Curse
22. Humpback Whales with Gas (Hendra)
23. Listener Sponsored Radio #4
24. 2,015-Year-Old-Man (Belzer)
25. Fasten Your Seatbelts
26. Listener Sponsored Radio #5
27. Monolithic Oil
