= Eleanor Reissa =

American dramatist

- Born: 1956 (age 69–70); Brooklyn, New York, U.S.
- Education: Brooklyn College
- Occupations: Actress, director, playwright
- Website: www.eleanorreissa.com

Eleanor Reissa (born 1956) is an American actress, singer, theatre director, playwright, librettist, choreographer, translator, and author based in New York City. She works and performs in English and Yiddish speaking stages, and also interprets and performs Yiddish theatre and songs.

== Early life and education ==
Eleanor Reissa was born in Brooklyn, New York. Her parents were born in Poland. During World War II, they were both placed in German ghettos established in occupied Poland, and fought and lived through the Holocaust. In America, they both became sweatshop workers. Reissa studied in the New York City public school system and received her Bachelor of Arts in Speech and Theatre at Brooklyn College, graduating cum laude.

== Directing and acting ==
One of Reissa's earliest professional credits was as a member of the 1977 National Lampoon comedy stage revue That's Not Funny, That's Sick, which played short engagements in Washington, D.C., and New York City.

Reissa's directing debut in Broadway garnered her a Tony Award nomination for Those Were the Days, which she also choreographed and starred in. Other New York directing credits include: Cowgirls (1995 Outer Critics Circle Award nomination), Echoes of the War (2005 Drama Desk Award nomination), and The Soldier's Wife (two 2006 Drama Desk Award nominations). In Yiddish, her New York directing credits include: Got Fun Nekome (God of Vengeance), Hershele Ostropolyer (adapted by Reissa), Zise Khaloymes (based on her English language play, Sweet Dreams), and Yoshke Muzikant: The Klezmer’s Tale. Furthermore, she was artistic director of the National Yiddish Theatre Folksbiene for five years.

On Broadway, she was in the cast of Paula Vogel's 2015 play Indecent, and was nominated for a Tony Award as the director of the musical Those Were the Days (which she also choreographed and starred in).

In April 2019, Reissa directed, co-created and featured as a vocalist in From Shtetl to Stage: A Celebration of Yiddish Music and Culture at Carnegie Hall.

== Music and recordings ==
Reissa has also sung in numerous American musicals in the theatre, including Tintypes, The Rise of David Levinsky, and Fiddler on the Roof.

Reissa's singing in Yiddish has earned her the title of the "Reigning Queen of Yiddish Cabaret". Additionally, she has been featured in Pearls of Yiddish Song, Remember the Children, Going Home: Gems of Yiddish Song, Songs in the Key of Yiddish, and in 2015, Just Add Water (Eleanor Reissa and Di Boyess).

She has collaborated with Frank London of the Klezmatics and the Klezmer Brass Allstars, to perform together internationally. Along with the Klezmatics, she recorded Vilde Mekhaye (Wild Ecstasy) in 2016. They have also performed in festivals and venues including Berlin, Toronto, Paris, Vienna, and in New York City at Joe's Pub and Feinstein's/54 Below.

She and Frank London performed their program Kurt Weill in New York at the Kurt Weill Festival in Dessau, (Germany) featuring Anthony Coleman, Greg Cohen, and Billy Martin.

== Playwriting ==
For her playwriting, Reissa received the Dorothy Silver Playwriting Award for Wishful Thinking, and then was shortlisted as a finalist for her play, Thicker Than Water a few years later. Reissa's plays have been published in an anthology called The Last Survivor and other Modern Yiddish Plays. Her play, The Last Dinosaur, was listed as finalist for the Actors Theatre of Louisville’s Heideman Award.

== Adaptations and Translations ==
Reissa was commissioned to adapt the story The Adventures of Hershele Ostropolyer (also known as Hershel of Ostropol) as a musical for the National Yiddish Theatre, Folksbiene, where it was played for two consecutive seasons, starring Mike Burstyn. It was then performed in Israel at Yiddishpiel, the same location where it was nominated for the Israel Prize as well. After this, Reissa was also commissioned by Yiddishpiel to adapt the 1937 film, Yidl Mitn Fidl to a stage musical in 2014, where it has a successful run.

In 2019, Reissa also received a commission by the National Yiddish Theatre, Folksbiene to translate Paddy Chayevsky’s The Tenth Man, into Yiddish (with Harvey Varga), which was slated for the 2020 season with her as director.

She also worked on the libretto for the opera Taibele and Her Demon, based on the short story by Isaac Bashevis Singer, with composer, Judd Greenstein

== The Letters Project: A Daughter’s Journey ==
After the death of her mother, Reissa found letters sent by her father, a survivor of Auschwitz, in the late 1940s to her mother, a survivor of a slave labor camp in Uzbekistan. She eventually had them translated and traveled to Germany, later writing The Letters Project: A Daughter’s Journey, which was published by Post Hill Press in 2022.

== Directing ==
Year	Project	Role	Venue
1989	Cat on a Hot Tin Roof	Assistant Director	Broadway
1991	Those Were the Days	Director and Choreographer	Broadway
1992	A Stranger Among Us	Choreographer	Sidney Lumet feature film
1994	All That Glitters	Director	Women's Project NYC
1995	Cowgirls	Director and Choreographer	Minetta Lane Theatre
1995	My Fair Lady	Assistant Director	Broadway
1996	The Last Supper	Director	Florida
1997	Nothing like a Dame	Director	Broadway
1998	Songs of Paradise	Choreographer	The Public Theater
1999	Avenue X	Director and Choreographer	Marin Theatre Company
2000	Over the Rainbow: Yip Harburg's America	Director and Choreographer	Prince Music Theater
2001	Diana of Dobson's	Director	Mint Theater
2001	Screams of Kitty Genovese	Director	O'Neill Festival
2001	Song of the Turtle Dove	Director	O'Neill Festival
2002	Out of Sterno	Director	Cherry Lane Theatre
2003	Syncopation	Director and Choreographer	Marin Theatre Company
2004	Echoes of the War	Director	Mint Theater
2005	The Skin Game (play)	Director	Mint Theater
2006	Blood Drive	Director	O'Neill Festival
2006	Desperate Measures (musical)	Director	New York Musical Theatre Festival
2006	Soldier's Wife	Director	Mint Theater
2009	How to Succeed in Business Without Really Trying (musical)	Director	White Plains Performing Arts Center
2010	Hershele Ostropolyer	Director	National Yiddish Theatre Folksbiene
2013	The Threepenny Opera	Director and Choreographer	Colgate University
2014	The Scutley papers	Director	Workshop with Sally Field
2015	Yidl Mitn Fidl	Director	Yiddishpiel
2016	From Moses to Mostel	Director	The Town Hall
2016	God of Vengeance	Director	La MaMa Experimental Theatre Club
2019	Carnegie Hall's From Shtetl to Stage	Director and co-creator	Stern Auditorium

== Theater acting (partial list) ==
Year	Project	Director
1978	One Flew Over the Cuckoo's Nest (play)	Lee Sankowich
1982	Tintypes	Larry Deckle
1983	Godspell	Darwin Knight
1983	Songs of Paradise	Avi Hoffman
1984	Isn't it Romantic	Susan Rosenstock
1985	Bar Mitzvah Boy	Robert Kalfin
1987	The Rise of David Levinsky	Sue Lawless
1990	Those Were the Days	Self
1998	Lost in Yonkers	Peter Lawrence
2002	Yentl	Robert Kalfin
2010	Soul Doctor	Holly-Anne Ruggiero
2012	The Material World	Stephan Brackett
2013	East Toward Home	David Schecter
2016	God of Vengeance	Eleanor Reissa
2017	Indecent	Rebecca Taichman
2018	The Sisters Rosensweig	Casey Stangel
2020	We All Fall Down	Melia Bensussen

== Film and television acting (partial list) ==
Year	Project	Director	Movie/TV
1992	A Stranger Among Us	Sidney Lumet	Feature
1994	Limboland	Lol Creme	Comedy Central
2010	Calling it Quits	Anthony Tarsitano	Indie Feature
2011	Trophy Kids	Josh Sugarman	Indie Feature
2013	Unforgettable	Jean de Segonzac	CBS
2019	Minyan	Eric Steel	Indie Feature
2019	The Plot Against America	Minkie Spiro	HBO Miniseries
2023	The walking dead - Dead City		AMC
2024	Die Zweiflers	Anja Marquardt	ARD

== Music/recordings list ==
- Pearls of Yiddish Song (1990)
- Remember the Children (1991)
- Going Home: Gems of Yiddish Song (1992)
- Songs in the Key of Yiddish (2002)
- Just Add Water with Di Boyess (2015)
- Wild Ecstasy (Vilde Mekhaye)' with Frank London (2017)
