= Sholem Asch =

Polish-American novelist, dramatist, essayist (1880–1957)

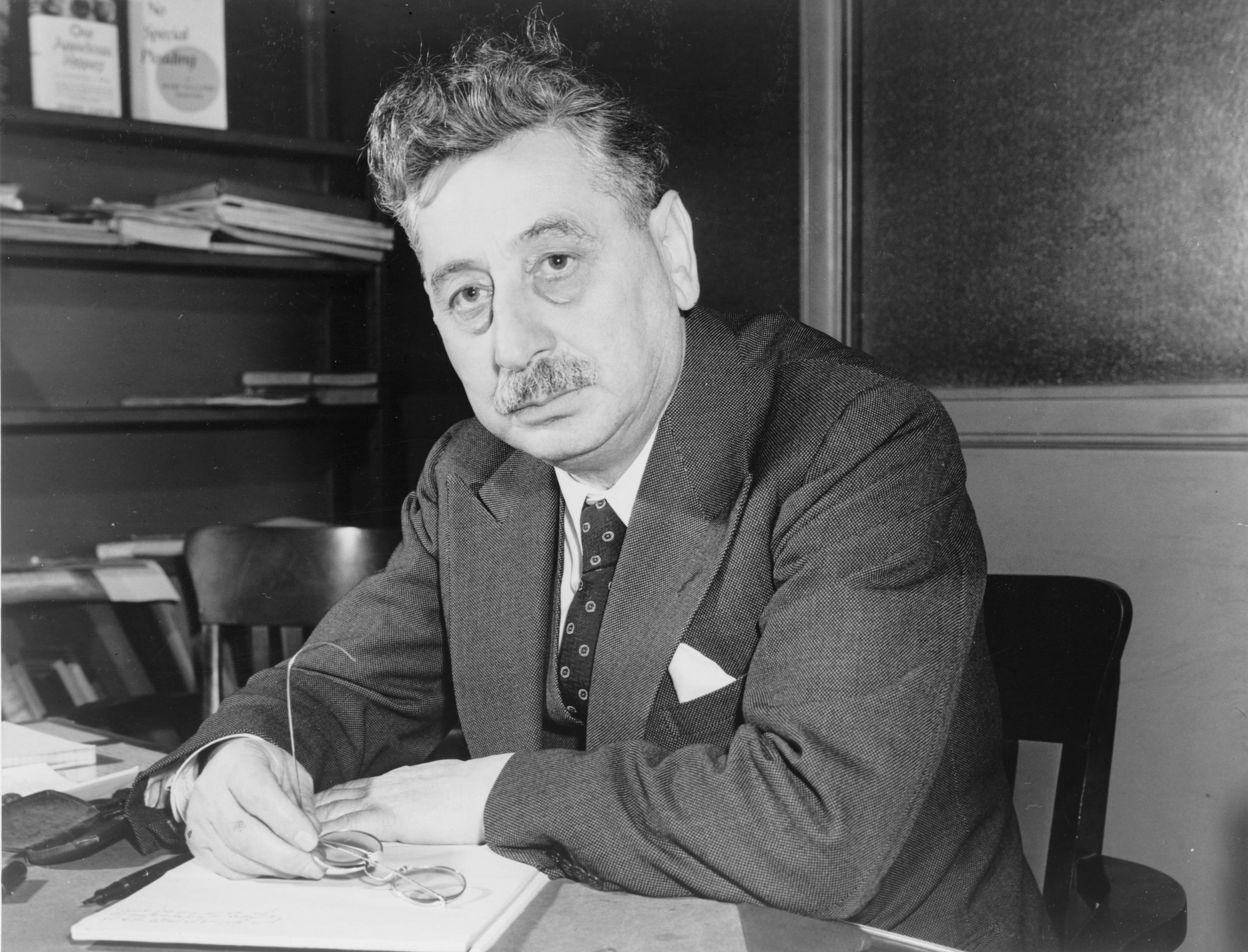
- Sholem Asch, 1940
- Born: Szalom Asz; 1 November 1880; Kutno, Congress Poland, Russian Empire
- Died: 10 July 1957 (aged 76); London, England
- Other names: Szalom Asz, Shalom Asch, Shalom Ash
- Occupations: Novelist; dramatist; essayist

Sholem Asch (Yiddish: שלום אַש, Polish: Szalom Asz; 1 November 1880 – 10 July 1957), also written Shalom Ash, was a Polish-Jewish novelist, dramatist, and essayist in the Yiddish language who settled in the United States. A prolific and widely translated writer, Asch wrote about Jewish life in Eastern Europe and America, producing novels, short stories, and plays that reached international audiences. Asch initially wrote in Hebrew, but, on the advice of the Yiddish writer I.L. Peretz, he subsequently decided to write only in Yiddish, becoming a significant cultural figure in the Yiddishist movement.

Asch's career was marked by both critical acclaim and controversy. His 1904 work A Shtetl offered an idyllic portrait of traditional Polish-Jewish life. In 1920, a 12-volume set of his collected works was published in honor of his 40th birthday. His 1906 play God of Vengeance, set in a Jewish brothel and featuring a lesbian relationship, sparked fierce debates both within the Jewish community and the greater political landscape. God of Vengeance encountered bans, arrests, and an obscenity trial when it played on Broadway in 1923. Lord Chamberlain banned the London production in 1946. Asch's trilogy Three Cities (1929–31) chronicled Jewish life in St. Petersburg, Warsaw, and Moscow. Asch was awarded Poland's Polonia Restituta decoration in 1932.

In his later career, Asch wrote another trilogy: The Nazarene (1939), The Apostle (1943), and Mary (1949), about the lives of Jesus, Paul, and the Virgin Mary. While Asch intended these works as a bridge between Jews and Christians and remained Jewish throughout his life, the trilogy generated controversy and many critics within the Jewish literary community viewed the books as promoting Christianity. Time Magazine praised the series, in a review of the final book in the trilogy, published in 1949.

Asch was a founding member of the American Jewish Joint Distribution Committee and was active in relief efforts for Jewish war victims in Europe. In 1953, Asch left the United States, after being questioned by the House Committee on Un-American Activities and amid ongoing controversy over his writing. He stated, "I am returning to England with a broken heart." He then split his time between London, continental Europe, and Israel. He died in London in 1957. His house in Bat Yam, Israel, is now the Sholem Asch Museum.

Asch was nominated for the Nobel Prize in Literature in 1946.

In 2023, Asch was recognized as a notable Yiddishist figure in the exhibit, Yiddish: A Global Culture, at the Yiddish Book Center in Amherst, Massachusetts. This exhibit was curated by Chief Curator David Mazower, and curators Mindle Cohen and Caraid O'Brien. O'Brien has also translated Asch's plays into English and was credited by The New York Times with contributing to a modern revival of interest in Asch's work.

Asch's work has been translated into English, Hebrew, French, German, Russian and other languages.

In recent years, his hometown of Kutno, Poland has hosted the Sholem Asch Festival to honor him.

== Life and work ==
=== Early Life and Upbringing ===
Asch was born Szalom Asz in 1880 in Kutno, Congress Poland, to Moyshe Gombiner Asch (Moszek Asz in Polish, b.1825, Gąbin – d.1905, Kutno), a business man, who was both a livestock trader and innkeeper, and Frajda Malka, née Widawska, also known as Malka (born 1850, Łęczyca). He grew up in a Hasidic family.

Moyshe's first wife Rude Shmit died in 1873, leaving him seven children. He remarried, to Frajda Malka.

Sholem was the fourth of the ten children that Moszek (Moyshe) and Frajda Malka had together. Moyshe had 17 children total. Asch's father Moszek spent all week on the road and returned home every Friday in time for the Sabbath. He was known as a very charitable man who would dispense money to the poor.

Asch grew up in Kutno, then a majority Jewish town, in which Jews constituted over 70% of the population in the 19th century. It was a diverse community that included Zionists, Bundists, and Hasidic Jews from various sects, and was known as a center of Torah study. Growing up, Asch thought Jews were the majority in the rest of the world as well.

In Kutno, Jews and gentiles mostly got along, barring some tension. As a child, Sholem had to sneak through a majority gentile area to get to a lake where he loved to swim, where he was once cornered by boys wielding sticks and dogs. These boys demanded he admit to killing "Christ" or they would rip his coat. Asch did not, at the time, know this to be a name for Jesus. He admitted to killing Christ out of fear, but they beat him and tore his coat anyway. Throughout his life, Asch remained fearful of dogs from that incident.

=== Early Education ===
Asch's parents sent him to the best cheder (religious school), where the wealthy families sent their children. There, he spent most of his childhood studying the Talmud and Torah, and would later study the Haggadah on his own time.

Asch's parents had high hopes that he would become a rabbi, and they separated him from his brothers and sent him to the best tutors with whom he studied just like “the very wealthiest children of the city." Moyshe expected Sholem's observable gifts as a student to translate into a career as a rabbi, while Sholem recalled feeling choked by his religious studies and by his sole language, Yiddish.

Sholem was fluent not only in his native Yiddish but in Russian, and literate in Hebrew.

In his adolescence, he moved on from the cheder to the Beit Midrash (religious House of Study). At age fifteen or sixteen, he began to read non-religious books.

Asch became aware of major social changes in popular Jewish thinking. New ideas and the Enlightenment were asserting themselves in the Jewish world. At his friend's house, Sholem explored these new ideas by secretly reading many secular books, which led him to believe himself too worldly to become a rabbi.

At age 17, his parents found out about his reading what they considered profane literature and sent him to live with relatives in a nearby village, where he became a Hebrew teacher. After a few months there, he received a more liberal education at Włocławek, where he supported himself as a letter writer for the illiterate townspeople. In Włocławek, he became enamored with the work of prominent Yiddish writer I. L. Peretz. While there, he also began writing. He attempted to master the short story and wrote in Hebrew. What he wrote there was later revised, translated into Yiddish, and ultimately, launched his career.

=== Young adulthood ===
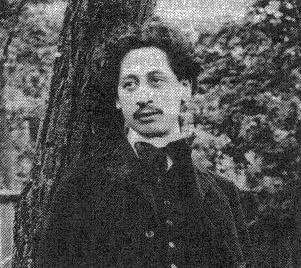
Sholem Asch as a young man

In 1899, he moved to Warsaw where he met I. L. Peretz and other young writers under Peretz's mentorship such as David Pinski, Abraham Reisen, and Hersh Dovid Nomberg. Influenced by the Haskalah (Jewish Enlightenment), Asch initially wrote in Hebrew, but Peretz convinced him to switch to Yiddish. Asch's reputation was established in 1902 with his first book of stories, In a shlekhter tsayt (In a Bad Time). In 1903, he married Mathilde Shapiro/Madzhe Szpiro, the daughter of the Polish-Jewish teacher and poet Menahem Mendel Shapiro.

In 1904, Asch released one of his most well-known works, A shtetl, an idyllic portrait of traditional Polish-Jewish life. In January 1905, he released the first play of his incredibly successful play-writing career, Tsurikgekumen (Coming Back).

Asch wrote the drama Got fun nekome (God of Vengeance) in the winter of 1906 in Cologne, Germany. It is about a Jewish brothel owner who attempts to become respectable by commissioning a Torah scroll and marrying off his daughter to a yeshiva student. Set in a brothel, the play includes Jewish prostitutes and a lesbian scene. I. L. Peretz famously said of the play after reading it: "Burn it, Asch, burn it!" Instead, Asch went to Berlin to pitch it to director Max Reinhardt and actor Rudolph Schildkraut, who produced it at the Deutsches Theater. God of Vengeance opened on March 19, 1907, and ran for six months, and soon was translated and performed in a dozen European languages.

The play was first brought to New York City by David Kessler in 1907. The audience mostly came for Kessler, and they booed the rest of the cast. The New York production sparked a major press war between local Yiddish papers, led by the Orthodox Jewish Tageplatt and even the secular Forverts. Orthodox papers referred to God of Vengeance as "filthy," "immoral," and "indecent," while radical papers described it as "moral," "artistic," and "beautiful". Some of the more provocative scenes in the production were changed, but it wasn't enough for the Orthodox papers. Even Yiddish intellectuals and the play's supporters had problems with the play's inauthentic portrayal of Jewish tradition, especially Yankl's use of the Torah, which they said Asch seemed to be using mostly for cheap effects; they also expressed concern over how it might stigmatize Jewish people who already faced much anti-Semitism. The association with Jews and sex work was a popular stereotype at the time. Other intellectuals criticized the writing itself, claiming that the second act was beautifully written but the first and third acts failed to support it.

God of Vengeance was published in English-language translation in 1918, translated by Isaac Goldberg. In 1922, it was staged in New York City at the Provincetown Theatre in Greenwich Village, and moved to the Apollo Theatre on Broadway on February 19, 1923, with a cast that included the acclaimed Jewish immigrant actor Rudolph Schildkraut. Its run was cut short on March 6, when the entire cast, producer Harry Weinberger, and one of the owners of the theater were indicted for violating the state's Penal Code, and later convicted on charges of obscenity. Weinberger, who was also a prominent attorney, represented the group at the trial. The chief witness against the play was Rabbi Joseph Silberman, who declared in an interview with Forverts: "This play libels the Jewish religion. Even the greatest anti-Semite could not have written such a thing". After a protracted battle, the conviction was successfully appealed. In Europe, the play was popular enough to be translated into German, Russian, Polish, Hebrew, Italian, Czech, Romanian and Norwegian.

Indecent is a 2015 play written by Paula Vogel that recounts the controversy of God of Vengeance. It opened on Broadway at the Cort Theater in April 2017, directed by Rebecca Taichman.

Asch attended the Czernowitz Yiddish Language Conference of 1908, which declared Yiddish to be "a national language of the Jewish people." He traveled to Palestine in 1908 and the United States in 1910, a place about which he felt deeply ambivalent.

=== Later adult career ===
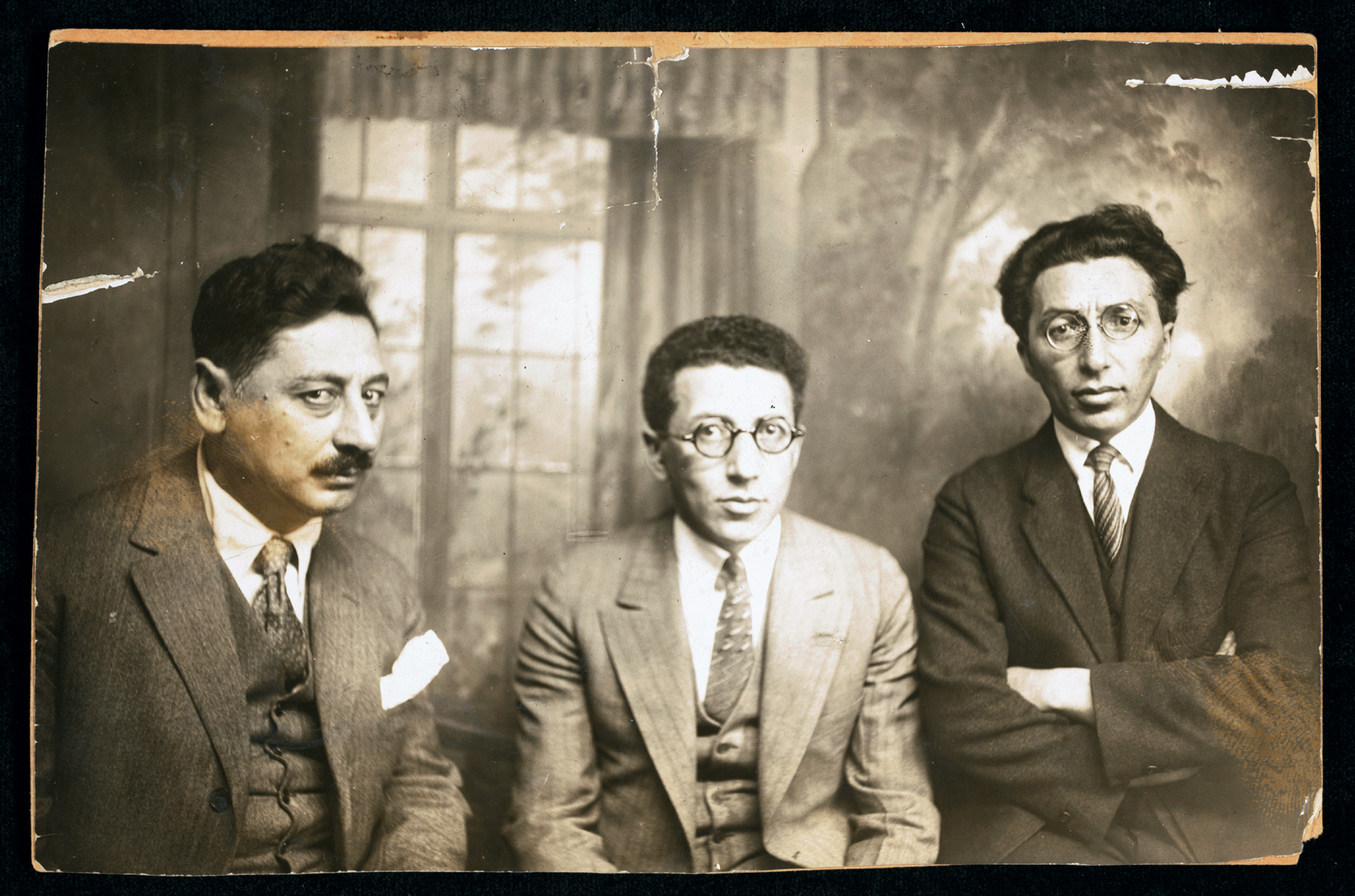
Asch (left) with literary critic Shmuel Niger and Niger's brother, labor leader Baruch Charney Vladeck c. 1920s

In the pursuit of a safe haven from the violence in Europe, he, Mathilde and their four children moved to the United States in 1914, moving around New York City for a while before settling in Staten Island. In New York, he began to write for Forverts, the mass-circulation Yiddish daily that had also covered his plays, a job provided both income and an intellectual circle.

Asch became increasingly active in public life and played a prominent role in the American Jewry's relief efforts in Europe for Jewish war victims. He was a founding member of the American Jewish Joint Distribution Committee. After a series of pogroms in Lithuania in 1919, Asch visited the country as representative of the Joint Committee, and he suffered a nervous breakdown due to the shock of the horrors he witnessed. His Kiddush ha-Shem (1919), chronicling the anti-Jewish and anti-Polish Chmielnicki Uprising in mid-17th century Ukraine and Poland, is one of the earliest historical novels in modern Yiddish literature. In 1920, he became a naturalized citizen of the United States.

Asch returned to Poland in 1923, visiting Germany frequently. The Yiddish literary circle hoped he would stay in Poland, because I. L. Peretz's death in 1915 had left them devoid of a head figure. Asch had no desire to take Peretz's place, moving to Bellevue, France after years and continuing to write regularly for Yiddish papers in the US and Poland. In Bellevue, he wrote his 1929–31 trilogy Farn Mabul. (Before the Flood, translated as Three Cities) describes early 20th century Jewish life in Saint Petersburg, Warsaw, and Moscow. Ever the traveller, Asch took many trips to the Soviet Union, Palestine and the United States. He always held painters in high regard and formed close friendships with the like of Isaac Lichtenstein, Marc Chagall, Emil Orlik, and Jules Pascin. He spoke to the hundreds of mourners at Pascin's funeral after the painter died by suicide.

Asch was a celebrated writer in his own lifetime. In 1920, in honor of his 40th birthday, a committee headed by Judah L. Magnes published a 12-volume set of his collected works. In 1932 he was awarded the Polish Republic's Polonia Restituta decoration and was elected honorary president of the Yiddish PEN Club.

In 1930, when Asch was at the height of his fame and popularity, he moved to Nice, then almost immediately moved back to Poland and spent months touring the countryside to do research for his next novel: Der tehilim-yid (Salvation). He then moved into a house outside of Nice and rebuilt it as the "Villa Shalom," with luxuries such as a study facing the sea, a swimming pool, a bowling green, and an orchard. In 1935, he visited America at the Joint Committee's request to raise funds for Jewish relief in Europe.

Asch's next work, Bayrn Opgrunt (1937, translated as The Precipice), is set in Germany during the hyperinflation of the 1920s. Dos Gezang fun Tol (The Song of the Valley) is about the halutzim (Jewish-Zionist pioneers in Palestine), and reflects his 1936 visit to that region. Asch visited Palestine again in 1936. Then, in 1939, he returned to Villa Shalom for the last time. He delayed leaving Europe until the last possible moment, then reluctantly returned to the United States.

On his second sojourn in the US, Asch first lived in Stamford, Connecticut, then moved to Miami Beach, where he stayed until the early 1950s. He offended Jewish sensibilities with his 1939–1949 trilogy, The Nazarene, The Apostle, and Mary, which dealt with New Testament subjects. Maurice Samuel, Asch's translator of the first two books from Yiddish into English, refused to do so with Mary and asked Asch not to publish. He felt that while the first two books only described Christian beliefs, Mary went much further by affirming them, including beliefs that had been abandoned by most Protestants. Nevertheless, Samuel always maintained that Asch was not an apostate. Despite accusations of conversion, Asch remained proudly Jewish; he had written the trilogy not as a promotion of Christianity but as an attempt to bridge the gap between Jews and Christians. Much of his readership and the Jewish literary community, however, did not see it that way. His long-standing employer, New York Yiddish newspaper Forverts, not only dropped him as a writer but also openly attacked him for promoting Christianity. He subsequently started writing for a communist paper, Morgen frayhayt, leading to repeated questioning by the House Committee on Un-American Activities. In 1953, Chaim Lieberman published The Christianity of Sholem Asch, a scathing criticism of Asch and his Christological trilogy that disgusted even some of Asch's strongest critics. Lieberman's book, and the McCarthy Hearings, led Asch and his wife Mathilde to leave the US in 1953, whereafter they split their time between London (where their daughter lived), continental Europe, and Israel.

== Death and legacy ==
Asch spent most of his last two years in Bat Yam near Tel Aviv, Israel, in a house that the mayor had invited him to build, but died in London at his desk writing. Due to his controversies, his funeral in London was small. His house in Bat Yam is now the Sholem Asch Museum and part of the MoBY-Museums of Bat Yam complex of three museums. The bulk of his library, containing rare Yiddish books and manuscripts, as well as the manuscripts of some of his own works, is held at Yale University. Although many of his works are no longer read today, his best works have proven to be standards of Jewish and Yiddish literature. His four children were Moszek Asz/Moses "Moe" Asch (2 December 1905, Warsaw – 19 October 1986, United States), the founder and head of Folkways Records, Natan Asz/Nathan Asch (1902, Warsaw – 1964, United States) and Janek Asz/John Asch (1907, Warsaw – 1997, United States), both also writers; and daughter Ruth Asch Shaffer (1910, Warsaw – 2006, England).

His grandson Michael Asch is an anthropologist, and his great-grandsons are David Mazower, a writer and a BBC Journalist., and Mark Mazower, an author and history professor at Columbia University.

In July, 1967 a street in Co-op City, the Bronx, New York was named in honor of Asch (Asch Loop).

== Inspirations and major themes ==
Many of Asch's father figures are inspired by his own father. Sholem was believed to have adopted much of his own philosophies from his father, such as his love for humanity and his concern for Jewish-Christian reconciliation. He summed up his father's faith as "love of God and love of neighbor". Asch often wrote two kinds of characters: the pious Jew and the burly worker. This was inspired by his family, as his brothers dealt with peasants and butchers and fit in with the hardy outdoor Jews of Kutno, which Asch had much pride in. His older half-brothers, on the other hand, were pious Hasidim.

One of Asch's major goals in his writing was to articulate Jewish life, past and present. He placed the Jew at the center of his every work, along with an awareness of the Jewish relationship with the outside world. Some of his most frequent recurring themes were: man's faith, goodness, and generosity. He was repelled and intrigued by Christian violence, and inspired by Jewish martyrdom and survival.

Asch reflected on cosmopolitan interests and concern for the people and conditions he encountered. His fiction can mostly be put into three categories: tales, novels and plays of Eastern European Jewish life (Polish mostly); tales and novels of Jewish life in America; five biblical novels: two on figures in the Hebrew Bible and three on New Testament figures. Smaller groupings included works on the Holocaust and modern Israel. His work was not easily categorized, and straddled the lines between romanticism and realism, naturalism and idealism.

== Bibliography ==
- A Shtetl ("The Village"), 1904 or earlier, story
- Mitn Shtrom (With the Stream), 1904 novel and play
- Tsurikgekumen (Coming Back), 1905
- Moshiakhs tsaytn (Time of the Messiah), 1906, play
- Got fun Nekomeh (God of Vengeance), 1907, play
- Mary, 1913, novel
- Reb Shloyme Nogid, 1913, novel
- Motke ganev (Yiddish: מאטקע גנב Mottke the Thief), 1915, novel
- Mary, 1917, play
- Der Veg tsu Zikh (The Way to Oneself), 1917, play
- Motke ganev (Mottke the Thief), 1917, play
- Onkl Mozes (Uncle Moses), 1918 (translated into English 1938), novel
- Kiddush ha-Shem, 1919 (translated into English 1926), novel
- Di Muter (The Mother), 1919 (translated into English 1930)
- Di Kishufmakherin fun Kastilien (The Witch of Castile), 1921
- Der Toyter Mensch (The Dead Man), 1922, play (translated into English 2021)
- Urteyl (Death Sentence), 1924
- Khaym Lederers Tsurikkumen (The Return of Khaym Lederer), 1927
- Schalom Asch, "Rückblick," Jahrbuch (Berlin: Paul Zsolnay Verlag, 1931), pp. 35–77.
- Farn Mabul trilogy (Before the Flood) 1929–31, translated as Three Cities, 1933
- Die Gefangene Gottes (God's Captives), 1932
- Der T'hilim Yid, 1934, translated as: Salvation
- The War Goes On, 1935
- The Calf of Papers, 1936, novel
- Bayrn Opgrunt, 1937, translated as: The Precipice
- The Mother, 1937, novel
- Three Novels, 1938
- Dos Gezang fun Tol (The Song of the Valley), 1938 (translated into English, 1939)
- The Nazarene, 1939, novel
- What I Believe 1941, essay, 201 pages
- Children of Abraham, 1942, short stories
- My Personal Faith, 1942, Published: London, George Rutledge & Sons, Ltd
- The Apostle, 1943, novel
- One Destiny: An Epistle to the Christians, 1945
- East River, 1946, spent more than 6 months on the New York Times Best Seller List (1946–7) including one week at No. 1
- Tales of My People, 1948, short stories
- Mary, 1949, novel, unrelated to his earlier work of the same name
- Salvation, 1951
- Moses, 1951, novel
- A Passage in the Night, 1953
- The Prophet, 1955

=== Discography ===
- In the Beginning: Bible Stories for Children by Sholem Asch (Performed by Arna Bontemps) (Folkways Records, 1955)
- Joseph and His Brothers: From In the Beginning by Sholem Asch (Performed by Arna Bontemps) (Folkways Records, 1955)
- Jewish Classical Literature: Read by Chaim Ostrowsky (Folkways Records, 1960)
- Nativity: Sholem Asch's Story of the Birth of Jesus (Performed by Pete Seeger) (Folkways Records, 1963)
- Readings from the Bible - Old Testament: Compiled by Sholem Asch (Performed by Harry Fleetwood) (Folkways Records, 1972)
- Sholem Asch: A Statement and Lecture at Columbia University, N.Y. October, 1952 (Folkways Records, 1977)
