= Caraid O'Brien =

Writer, performer, translator and director

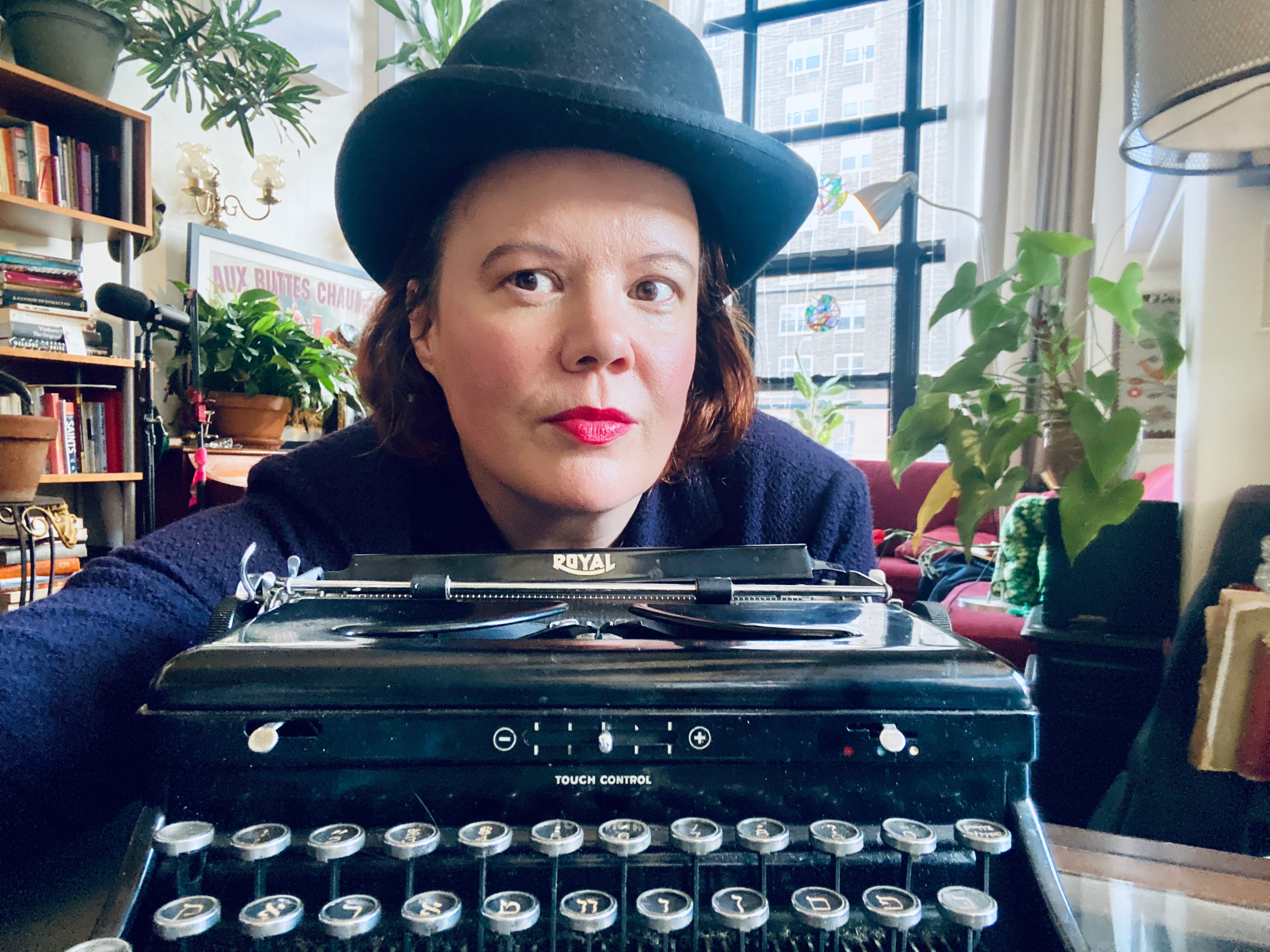
- Born: December 20, 1974 (age 51); Galway, Ireland
- Writing career
- Language: Translator

Caraid O'Brien (born December 20, 1974) is an Irish-born, US-based writer, performer, translator and theater director. Although she is from an Irish Catholic background, she is best known for her work with material originally written in Yiddish. Former Theater J Artistic Director Adam Immerwahr has praised "her superb theatrical ear and facility for transforming Yiddish work into relevant contemporary text."

== Family, youth and education ==
O’Brien was born in Galway in 1974, one of five children of Michael and Patricia Gill O'Brien. Her maternal grandfather was an Irish-speaker from the Aran Islands and, by O'Brien's account, her paternal grandmother was a great storyteller. Her family were back and forth several times between Ireland and Eastern Massachusetts. When she was 12, her family moved definitively to Hingham, Massachusetts. Her father, Michael O'Brien, is a pathologist; as of 2023 he is an emeritus professor at Boston University.

She discovered Yiddish literature and Jewish American literature as a teenager, as part of her high school studies of American literature. At the time, she already had a strong interest in Irish literature, but teacher Catherine Doyle assigned their class stories by Bernard Malamud, Saul Bellow, and Cynthia Ozick (all of whom wrote in English but were either Yiddish-speakers or a generation removed), as well as Yiddish-language writer Isaac Bashevis Singer, the latter in translation, of course. This led her to look at the Boston Public Library to seek further Yiddish literature in translation, among which she discovered Chaim Grade. Grade's My Mother's Sabbath Days inspired her to decide to learn Yiddish. While in high school, she also learned enough French to read a novel by Albert Camus in the original.

As early as elementary school O'Brien had an interest in acting. In her all-girls high school, Notre Dame Academy in Hingham, she played male leads in plays by Oscar Wilde. She relates that her parents were relieved, though, when she didn't choose to major in theater in college: "[T]wo of [my siblings] majored in French literature... And if I wanted to learn Yiddish instead of French, that was fine with them."

As an undergraduate at Boston University, unable at first to find any opportunity to study Yiddish, she studied some Hebrew and became comfortable with the Hebrew alphabet, in which Yiddish is written. She discovered from a poster the possibility to learn Yiddish as a summer intern at the Yiddish Book Center in Western Massachusetts. After completing that internship, taking advantage of her now-decent knowledge of Hebrew and Yiddish, she was able to spend a year studying at Hebrew University of Jerusalem, taking advanced Yiddish literature classes with Avraham Novershtern, and Nati Cohen, and Mikhl Borden. She later said of this experience, "I understood what I understood. But it was a lot. It really just kind of dipped me into deep waters, and I gained a tremendous amount from it."

A class on Yiddish theater taught by Ruth Wisse (then chair of the Yiddish department at Harvard) introduced O'Brien to Sholem Asch's play God of Vengeance, about a Jewish brothel-owner whose bid for respectability crumbles when his daughter, whom he has kept entirely away from men, becomes sexually involved with one of the prostitutes in the brothel. O'Brien would later write a new translation of that play. Her main paper for that class was on "Yoshke Muzikant" ("Yoshke the Musician") and the many versions of it presented over the years by Joseph Buloff of the Vilna Troupe, perhaps the most prominent literary/art theater group to perform in Yiddish. While she was researching for that paper in the Yiddish theater archives at Harvard, librarian Charles Berlin offered to connect her to Buloff's widow Luba Kadison, also a former member of the Vilna Troupe (and daughter of its founder Leib Kadison), then still alive and in New York, who became one of O'Brien's mentors. For many years, the two met on a weekly basis.

== Career ==
After college O'Brien moved to New York City and began getting some roles as an actress. Her initial intentions were not at all specific to Yiddish theater, but as she put it in 2019, "I had the passport, because I spoke the language... The same thing happened in college. I studied with Elie Wiesel, because I spoke Yiddish. I spoke to Saul Bellow in Yiddish. I spoke to Harold Bloom in Yiddish..." Besides acting, she worked at NYU, putting together a website on Yiddish theater, which included translating books and posting excerpts. Disappointed with a translation of God of Vengeance she saw staged at a venue on Ludlow Street, she began work on a translation of her own. This resulted in a November 1999 production at Show World, historically a porn venue at Eighth Avenue at 43rd Street, portions of which were still showing porn at the time; under zoning-based pressure from the administration of mayor Rudy Giuliani, they were required to devote some of their stages to "cultural" programming. O'Brien played the prostitute Hindl; years later, in 2017 she played the role of Sarah, the brothel-owner's wife, in New Yiddish Rep's Yiddish-language production of God of Vengeance at the off-Broadway Theatre at St. Clement's Church She also translated Asch's Motke the Thief for a 2005 production at the University Settlement on Eldridge Street.

Besides her friendship with Luba Kadison, O'Brien also got to know the famous Yiddish musical theater tenor Seymour Rexite, and in the last five years of his life helped organize Rexite's recordings and papers for Harvard University.

Beginning in 2002, O'Brien directed the James Joyce "Bloomsday" readings at Symphony Space. When WBAI's "Radio Bloomsday" split from that in 2008, she went with the radio side and became the director of the annual radio broadcast, where she also performs Molly Bloom's soliloquy (the last chapter of Ulysses). In 2017, she performed in the first-ever Yiddish-language production of Eugene Ionesco's Rhinoceros at the Castillo Theatre on Theatre Row.

In 2022 the Jewish-American Theater J and the Irish-American arts organization Solas Nua, both based in Washington D.C., co-commissioned O'Brien to translate and adapt Sholem Asch's previously untranslated play Rabbi Doctor Silver; this was Theater J's first commissioned translation.

== Irish Yiddishkeit ==
Despite her immersion in Yiddish literature and culture, O'Brien remains (in her own words) "culturally... Catholic..., more Irish than anything." She analogizes certain aspects of the status of Jews in America to that of the Irish in the British Isles. In an interview, she talked about how, in first translating God of Vengeance, "my model for how I wanted it to be was John Millington Synge's The Playboy of the Western World" (written one year before God of Vengeance), where Synge immersed himself for several months in the Gaelic-speaking Aran Islands, then wrote his play in English with some Irish Gaelic words. As O'Brien puts it, "[I]t was a translation," and its boisterous plot constituted "a 'shande far di goyim [embarrassment in front of the Gentiles],'... but in an Irish context. And so I wanted to do that with Sholem Asch."

== Cultural Impact ==
O'Brien was credited by The New York Times with contributing to a modern revival of interest in Sholem Asch's work through her English-language translations of his plays.

== Works ==
=== Original works ===
- Colbert Quigley: a three act American tragedy (Finalist, Kennedy Center Fund for New American Plays)
- The Sandpiper (Leonard Nimoy Thalia, 2004), a verse comedy about three generations of Irish artists.

=== Translations from Yiddish ===
- God of Vengeance by Sholem Asch (performed 1999 at Show World, NYC)
- Jake the Mechanic by Dovid Pinski (an adaptation, commissioned by the National Foundation for Jewish Culture)
- The Dead Man by Sholem Asch (commissioned by the National Foundation for Jewish Culture, performed at Eldridge Street Project, 2003)
- Motke Thief by Sholem Asch (commissioned by the National Foundation for Jewish Culture, performed at University Settlement, 2005)
- Sholem Asch Underworld Trilogy (God of Vengeance, Motke Thief, The Dead Man); White Goat Press (undated), ISBN 9798987160992
