= Sidney Dark =

English journalist, author and critic

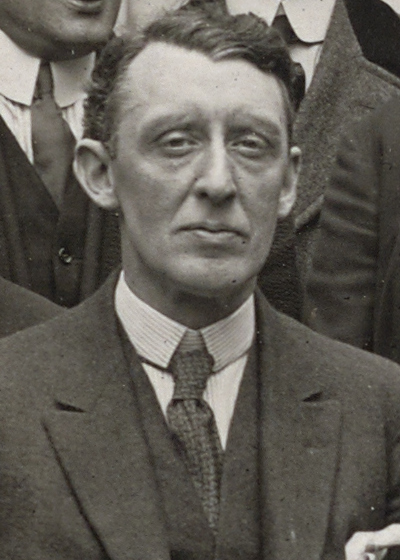
Sidney Dark in April 1919

Sidney Ernest Dark (14 January 1874 – 11 October 1947) was an English journalist, author and critic who was editor of the Church Times, among other publications. Dark wrote more than 30 books on subjects ranging from the church to literature and theatre, as well as biographies and novels.

== Life and career ==
Dark was born in Marylebone, London, the eldest son of Mary Jane (née Burns) and Henry Sidney Dark, who was a bat maker for Lord's Cricket Ground. He worked briefly in an office in Paris, trained as a singer and tried acting. He married Helen "Nellie" Sarah Anders, a journalist's daughter, in 1895, and the couple had a son and a daughter. His journalism career began in 1899 writing Green Room Gossip for the Daily Mail. After contributing a range of articles, he moved to the Daily Express in 1902, beginning as their theatre critic. He remained there for 17 years and was special correspondent of the paper during the Paris Peace Conference, 1919. The same year, he became joint editor of John O'London's Weekly, then in 1924, became editor of the Church Times. Dark steered the Anglo Catholic weekly's political agenda to the left. He was a founder of the PEN Club. In 1927 he was elected a fellow of the Institute of Journalism. At the Church Times Dark's left-leaning politics often clashed with the traditional Tory values of the owner, Fred Palmer.

Dark wrote more than 30 books, covering theology and church history, novels, children's books, literature anthologies and theatre. His novels were The Man Who Would Not Be King and Afraid, and his biographical works covered W. S. Gilbert, Sir Arthur Pearson and Charles Wood, 2nd Viscount Halifax. He wrote an autobiography, Not such a Bad Life, in 1941. Critical of Hitler and Mussolini, and the Catholic Church's anti-communist alliance with them before the Second World War, Dark was also concerned about antisemitism, considering it a "moral abdication of Christendom". he wrote:

Anti-Semitism is not merely a Jewish concern: it is a concern of all men who care for justice, decency and kindness, and all who value their individual freedom won by centuries of struggle against tyranny and privilege. When the Jew is persecuted, all minorities, and, indeed, even majorities, disliked by the controllers of the state, are in danger. (Dark, The Folly of Anti-Semitism, 1939, p. 90)

After retiring as editor of Church Times in 1941, Dark moved to Sonning, Berkshire, where he continued to write. He died in Reading at the age of 73.

== Publications ==
- Charles Dickens. T Nelson & Sons. 1919.
- W. S. Gilbert: His Life and Letters (1923) Methuen & Co. Ltd ISBN 0-405-08430-7 (with Rowland Grey)
- Fleet Street : an Anthology of Modern Journalism (editor)
- Mackay of All Saints. Moorehouse Publishers.
- The Folly of Anti-Semitism, 1939.
- I Sit and I Think and I Wonder
- The Flower of Cities All (London)
- Wilson Carlile: The Laughing Cavalier of Christ. James Clark and Company.
- The English Counties Illustrated, 1948 (the chapters on London, Middlesex, Surrey and Hampshire)

== Literature ==
- Palmer, Bernard (1991). Gadfly for God: History of the "Church Times", Hodder & Stoughton ISBN 034053818X
