= God of Vengeance =

1906 play by Sholem Asch

- Original language: Yiddish
- Written by: Sholem Asch
- Subject: A Jewish brothel owner who attempts to become respectable by commissioning a Torah scroll and marrying off his daughter to a yeshiva student.
- Genre: Drama

Premiere
- Date: March 19, 1907
- Place: Deutsches Theater

God of Vengeance (Yiddish: גאָט פֿון נעקאָמע, Got fun nekome) is a 1906 play by Sholem Asch. It is about a Jewish brothel owner who attempts to become respectable by commissioning a Torah Scroll and marrying off his daughter to a yeshiva student.

Set in a brothel, the play explores themes of religious hypocrisy and morality. The play is notable for its progressive portrayal of a lesbian relationship, which was the first lesbian kiss on an American stage. I. L. Peretz famously said of the play after reading it: "Burn it, Asch, burn it!" Instead, Asch went to Berlin and pitched it to director Max Reinhardt and actor Rudolph Schildkraut, who produced it at the Deutsches Theater.

== Production ==
Asch wrote God of Vengeance in the winter of 1906 in Cologne, Germany. The play was first brought to New York City, United States by David Kessler in 1907.

God of Vengeance was published in English-language translation in 1918. In 1922, it was staged in New York City at the Provincetown Theatre in Greenwich Village, and moved to the Apollo Theatre on Broadway on February 19, 1923, with a cast that included the acclaimed Jewish immigrant actor Rudolph Schildkraut. Its run was cut short on March 8, when the entire cast, producer Harry Weinberger, and one of the owners of the theater were indicted for violating the New York Penal Code, and later convicted on charges of obscenity. Weinberger, who was also a prominent attorney, represented the group at the trial. The chief witness against the play was Rabbi Joseph Silverman, who declared in an interview with Forverts: "This play libels the Jewish religion. Even the greatest anti-Semite could not have written such a thing". After a lengthy legal battle, the conviction was successfully appealed.

God of Vengeance was the first Yiddish play to be translated and staged throughout Europe. From Berlin, Asch went straight to St. Petersburg for the Russian-language premiere. Over the next few years Asch’s “brothel play” was also translated into Polish, Hebrew, English, Italian, French, Dutch, Czech, Swedish, and Norwegian. In 1912, the Moscow branch of the cinema firm Pathé Frères released a silent film of Got fun nekome with Russian titles. According to film historian J. Hoberman, it was adapted to film by Pathé Frères Moscow, starring two Jewish actors, Israel Arko and Misha Fishzon, at the head of a mainly non-Jewish cast. The film was adapted and directed by Pathé's Jewish specialist, Alexander Arkatov, and released in November 1912. However, the film is now presumed lost. God of Vengeance found its greatest success on the Yiddish stage. Actor Dovid Kessler headed the cast of the New York Yiddish premiere and the play was also popular among the amateur Yiddish dramatic groups that flourished worldwide in the early twentieth century.

In 2015, Paula Vogel created the play Indecent which she submitted as her Ph.D. dissertation at Cornell. The play recounts the controversy surrounding the play. The play first premiered at the Yale Repertory Theatre in 2015, followed by an off-Broadway run in 2016 and Broadway debut in 2017 for which it was nominated for three and won two Tony Awards.

== Synopsis ==
The play centers around Yankl Tchaptchovitch (Yekel Shepshovitch), a Jewish brothel owner who strives to maintain a façade of piety and respectability. He commissions a Torah scroll and aspires to marry off his daughter, Rivkele, to a scholar in hopes of distancing her from his sordid business. Despite his efforts to preserve her innocence, Rivkele falls in love with Manke, one of the prostitutes working in Yankl's brothel. Their relationship exposes the hypocrisy and moral corruption underlying Yankl's life.

Yankl's wife, Sarah, supports his ambitions but becomes increasingly conflicted as she witnesses the unfolding drama between Rivkele and Manke. The relationship between Rivkele and Manke becomes a catalyst for the unraveling of Yankl's carefully constructed world. When Rivkele's involvement with Manke is discovered, Yankl's plans for her future are shattered, and he descends into a desperate attempt to salvage his and his family's honor.

== Cast ==
Character	Original Broadway cast	2016 Off-Off-Broadway Revival
Shloyme	Irwin J. Adler	Luzer Twersky
Hindel	Mae Berland	Caraid O’Brien
Reb Aaron	Morris Carnovsky	Eli Rosen
Reb Ali (Eli)	Sam Jaffe	David Mandelbaum
Rifkele (Rivke)	Virginia MacFadyen	Shayna Schmidt
Reb Yankev	James Meighan	Eli Rosen
Manke	Dorothee Nolan	Melissa Weisz
Yankl Tchaptchovitch (Yekel Shepshovitch)	Rudolph Schildkraut	Shane Baker
A Poor Woman	Marjorie Stewart	Amy Coleman
Sarah	Esther Stockton	Eleanor Reissa
Reizel (Reyzl)	Lillian Taiz	Rachel Botchan
Basha	Aldea Wise	Mira Kessler

== Background ==
Born into a Hasidic family, Sholem Asch received a traditional Jewish education. Considered the designated scholar of his siblings, his parents dreamed of him becoming a Rabbi and sent him to the town's best cheder. There, Asch spent most of his childhood studying the Talmud, and would later study the Bible and the Haggadah on his own time. Asch grew up in a majority Jewish town, so he grew up believing Jews were the majority in the rest of the world as well. In Kutno, Jews and gentiles mostly got along, barring some tension around religious holidays.

In his adolescence, after moving from the cheder to the beth midrash, Asch became aware of major social changes in popular Jewish thinking. New ideas and the Enlightenment were asserting themselves in the Jewish world. At his friend's house, Asch would explore these new ideas by secretly reading many secular books, which led him to believe himself too worldly to become a Rabbi. At age 17, his parents found out about this "profane" literature and sent him to live with relatives in a nearby village, where he became a Hebrew teacher. After a few months there, he received a more liberal education at Włocławek, where he supported himself as a letter writer for the illiterate townspeople. It is in Włocławek where he became enamored with the work of prominent Yiddish writer I. L. Peretz. It is also where he began writing. He attempted to master the short story and wrote in Hebrew. What he wrote there would later be revised, translated into Yiddish, and ultimately, launch his career.

In 1923, Asch wrote an open letter defending the play following the cast's arrest for obscenity which elaborated on the origins and early success of God of Vengeance. His letter said in part, "I wrote this play when I was twenty-one years of age. I was not concerned whether I wrote a moral or immoral play. What I wanted to write was an artistic play and a true one. In the seventeen years it has been before the public, this is the first time I have had to defend it. When the play was first produced, the critics in Germany, Russia, and other countries, said that it was too artistically moral. They said that for a man like “Yekel Shepshovitch,” keeper of a brothel, to idealize his daughter, to accept no compromise with her respectability, and for girls like Basha and Raizel, filles de joie, to dream about their dead mother, their home, and to revel in the spring rain, was unnatural."

== Critical reception ==
The New York production sparked a major press war between local Yiddish papers, led by the Orthodox Tageplatt and even the secular Forverts. Orthodox papers referred to God of Vengeance as "filthy," "immoral," and "indecent," while other papers described it as "moral," "artistic," and "beautiful". Some of the more provocative scenes in the production were changed, but it wasn't enough for the Orthodox papers. Even Yiddish intellectuals and the play's supporters had problems with the play's inauthentic portrayal of Jewish tradition, especially Yankl's use of the Torah, which they said Asch used for cheap effects; they also expressed concern over how it might stigmatize Jewish people who already faced anti-Semitism. The association with Jews and sex work was a popular stereotype at the time. Other intellectuals criticized the writing itself, claiming that the second act was beautifully written but the first and third acts failed to support it.

== Indecent ==
The controversy surrounding God of Vengeance is recounted in Indecent, a 2015 American play by Paula Vogel. A troupe of actors and musicians tells the story of the play, from Asch's first public reading through its various European productions, to the Broadway production and trial. The play ends with a performance in a tiny attic in the Łódź Ghetto, which is interrupted by the Nazis, a fantasy of Manke and Rifkele escaping, and Asch's refusal to allow a new American production after the war.

Indecent had an Off-Broadway run in 2016, followed by a Broadway run in 2017 at the Cort Theatre. The play was nominated for three Tony Awards. The play received positive reviews. In his review of the Broadway production for The New York Times, Ben Brantley said of the play "Indecent is, above all, decent, in the most complete sense of the word. It is virtuous, sturdily assembled, informative and brimming with good faith. The territory it covers in its one hour and 45 minutes is immense."
