= Isaac Goldberg =

Isaac Goldberg (1887 – July 14, 1938) was an American journalist, author, critic, translator, editor, publisher, and lecturer. Born in Boston to Jewish parents, he studied at Harvard University and received a BA degree in 1910, a MA degree in 1911 and a PhD in 1912. He traveled to Europe as a journalist during World War I writing for the Boston Evening Transcript.

He wrote biographies of H. L. Mencken, Havelock Ellis, W. S. Gilbert, Arthur Sullivan, and George Gershwin, books on theatrical and musical appreciation, books of Spanish-American Literature and contributed articles for many magazines. He also founded, published, and edited a monthly news magazine called Panorama.

He was fluent in Yiddish, Spanish, French, German, Italian, and Portuguese and translated a variety of literary works into English. He received a fellowship from the Guggenheim Foundation in 1932 to write a history of Spanish and Portuguese literature in the United States.

== Selected works ==
- Studies in Spanish-American literature, New York, Brentano's 1920
- The drama of transition; native and exotic playcraft, Cincinnati : Stewart Kidd company c1922
- Brazilian literature. New York, A. A. Knopf 1922 Reprinted Gordon Press 1975
- The theatre of George Jean Nathan : chapters and documents toward a history of the new American drama New York : Simon and Schuster 1926
- The story of Gilbert and Sullivan New York, Simon and Schuster, 1928
- The wonder of words; an introduction to language for everyman, New York, London, D. Appleton-Century Company, incorporated 1938
- George Gershwin : a study in American music New York : Simon and Schuster 1931, Reprinted F. Ungar Pub. Co. 1958
- Major Noah: American-Jewish pioneer, Philadelphia, New York : Knopf 1937, (about Noah, M. M. (Mordecai Manuel), 1785-1851
- (with Isidore Witmark) . The Story of the House of Witmark: From Ragtime to Swingtime. New York: L. Furman, 1939. Print.
