= Language federation =

Leadership of the Jewish Socialist Federation of the Socialist Party of America, 1917. Seated (L-R): Ben-Tsien Hofman, Max Goldfarb, Morris Winchevsky, A. Litvak, Hannah Salutsky, Moishe Terman. Standing: Shauchno Epstein, Frank Rozenblat, Baruch Charney Vladeck, Moissaye Olgin, Jacob Salutsky.

Language federations were formed in the late 19th and early 20th century by immigrants to the United States, primarily from Eastern and Southern Europe, who shared a commitment to some form of socialist politics. Some of these groups joined the Socialist Labor Party of America (SLP); later, many joined the Socialist Party of America (SPA) and then later joined one of the precursors of the Communist Party USA (CPUSA); a number of federations also remained in the Socialist Party. The Russian and Finnish federations were particularly important in the early years of the Communist Party.

== Historical overview ==
The Language Federations also served as an important cultural resource for immigrants, allowing them to maintain contact with political developments in their homelands and providing a gathering place for strangers in a strange land. Many groups had their own halls for dances and social gatherings which still exist, in name if not in function, in America's largest cities of the East and West Coasts and Midwest.

Each Language Federation arose at different times, as members of those national, ethnic or religious groups arrived in the United States. In addition, they typically sprung up at the grassroots level, affiliating with other local groups to form national federations before attaching themselves to political parties. They often resisted attempts by the parties to which they were affiliated to bring them into line with the aims or platform of the group as a whole; indeed, at some points the various Language Federations made up such a large portion of socialist groups as to make top-down dictation of a uniform policy very difficult.

The SPA had a vexed relation with language federations: while it began recognizing them in the first decade of the 20th century and incorporating them within the party in the decade that followed, the party had often veered in the direction of nativism, particularly in the case of exclusion of Asian workers, but also directed against Eastern and Southern European immigrants. The SPA often appeared as if it did not know what to make of these foreign-language organizations and let them develop more or less independently. Even so, they grew exponentially during World War I and made up roughly half the SPA by 1918.

The SPA's executive committee formally expelled seven of these language federations in May 1919 when it became clear that they favored the left wing in the impending split within the party. The expelled federations formed the bulk of the membership of the new Communist Party of America led by Charles Ruthenberg and Louis Fraina; the Communist Labor Party of America, created later, appealed more to American-born workers. Not all federations aligned with Ruthenburg, however, in the factional infighting within the CPUSA in the years that followed: the German and Yiddish language federations, for example, were identified with the more conservative faction led by Ludwig Lore until he was expelled from the party.

The CPUSA, then named the Workers Party, tried in 1924 to disband the federations and reorganize the party on the cell structure that the Bolsheviks had employed, on directives from the Comintern. The party met with resistance, however, particularly from the Finnish Federation, whose members feared losing what influence they had if they were submerged within a larger English-speaking organization. While the party succeeded in "Bolshevizing" the federations, it may have lost fifty percent or more of these members in the process.

Although the SPA went into decline in the 1920s, it still drew a large part of its base from the foreign-born in these years. The old Language Federations within the SPA nearly all disappeared, however, by the early 1930s.

== List of American language federations ==
The following groups formed the most significant Language Federations:

=== Finnish Federations ===
Arising first in Boston, Massachusetts and Minnesota as benevolent organizations, the federation affiliated with the SPA around 1907. During its affiliation with the SPA it established its own Workers' College in Minnesota, published three newspapers, and divided the federation into three regional districts, with differing political outlooks. A power struggle soon ensued, with the national SPA intervening on the side of the conservative Eastern District. The Western and Central District branches were barred from establishing a rival federation, but Central District militants succeeded in taking control of the Workers College.

In 1919 the Federation split: a large number of Finnish members joined the CPUSA, representing nearly half of the members of the party at one point in the 1920s and maintaining a separate organizational presence within it, in the form of Finnish Workers' Clubs, until 1941. The Finnish Federation remained the largest foreign language federation within the SPA throughout the 1920s.

=== German Federations ===
German-speaking socialists made up so much of the early socialist groups that no steps were taken to organize a separate German language grouping either outside or within the SPA until 1912. That group drew heavily on organizations in New York and New Jersey. Those chapters split to join the CPUSA in 1919.

=== Hungarian Federations ===
Hungarian language political groups first appeared in the 1890s and affiliated with both the SLP and the SPA in the following decade. Some federations affiliated with the SLP later migrated to the Industrial Workers of the World. Most ended up with the SPA; relatively few left to join the CPUSA.

=== Irish Federations ===
Launched by James Connolly and others, the ISF aimed to raise class consciousness among Irish emigrants in America.

=== Italian Federations ===
A socialist Italian language federation was formed as part of the SLP in 1902, but split from it the following year. The majority of the federation's members were syndicalist and remained unaligned with either party, while a minority affiliated with the SPA in 1910. Most of those members remained with the SPA in 1919, although the New York City branch joined the CPUSA. There were apparently never enough Italian-speaking members within the CPUSA to constitute a separate Federation. Italian-speaking garment workers in New York City also maintained their own locals within the International Ladies' Garment Workers' Union, both when they were aligned with the SPA and under Communist leadership in the 1920s.

=== Jewish Federations ===
Main articles: Jewish Socialist Federation and Jewish Socialist Verband.

While Jewish workers of various nationalities also took part in those federations, Jewish workers also formed groups known as Arbeiterrings ("Workmen's Circles") in major cities in the late 19th century. More formal parties, however, tended to fragment, both on ideological grounds and on the distinction between newly arrived "greenhorns" with Bundist politics and the more assimilated immigrants from earlier decades. The Bundist tendency eventually prevailed after thousands of Jewish socialists fled Poland and Russian in the aftermath of the failed 1905 Revolution. The Jewish Federation within the SPA—not formally established until 1912—grew rapidly, publishing its own weekly newspaper. It split in 1919, with significant numbers of members remaining with the SPA.

=== Latvian Federation ===
The Latvian Federation within the CPUSA, with a high proportion of forestry workers, was the third largest within the party in 1921.

=== Lithuanian Federation ===
The Lithuanian Socialist Federation, founded in 1905, grew rapidly with an influx of members who had come to the United States to escape repression after the 1905 Revolution. The organization suffered splits, however, when anarchist and more strictly nationalist elements left and lost nearly half its members when it affiliated with the SPA in 1914. It published a number of weekly newspapers and a monthly journal while affiliated with the SPA. The SPA suspended the Federation in 1919, when a large number of members left for the CPUSA, where the Lithuanian Federation was one of the largest constituents.

=== Polish Federations ===
The Alliance of Polish Socialists in America was formed as an emigre group, dedicated to making revolution in Poland, rather than the United States. It merged with the Polish Section of the Socialist Party in 1913. It published a daily newspaper in Chicago and two weekly newspapers. It formally disaffiliated from the SPA in 1916, although a minority remained with the party. A few hundred members joined the CPUSA.

=== Russian Federations ===
A formal Russian Federation within the SPA was not created until 1917. It claimed more than 5,000 members in 1919, and largely went over to the CPUSA that year. It lost a number of members to deportation in the Palmer Raids that followed.

=== Scandinavian Federations ===
The SLP had an early Danish affiliate, although this organization appears to have disappeared in factional infighting in 1899. The SLP continued to publish in Swedish as late as the 1920s. Much of the SPA's Scandinavian Federation went over to the CPUSA in 1919.

=== Slovak Federation ===
The Slovak Socialist Federation, founded in Chicago in 1904, remained an autonomous organization until 1913, when it affiliated with the SPA. It continued to grow after affiliation, publishing several newspapers and maintaining more than twenty chapters.

=== South Slavic Federation ===
This federation, which consisted mostly of Croat and Slovenian members, affiliated with the SPA in 1910. The Slovenian members generally remained with the SPA after the split, while many Croat members went over to the CPUSA.

== See also ==
- Non-English press of the Socialist Party of America —Annotated list of Socialist Party publications — official, subsidized, or inspired — in languages other than English.
- Non-English press of the Communist Party USA —Annotated list of Communist Party publications — official, subsidized, or inspired — in languages other than English.

=== Canadian equivalent ===
- Ukrainian Social Democratic Party (Canada), and Association of United Ukrainian Canadians
- United Jewish Peoples' Order
- Federation of Russian Canadians
