= Morgen Freiheit =

American daily newspaper (1922–1988)

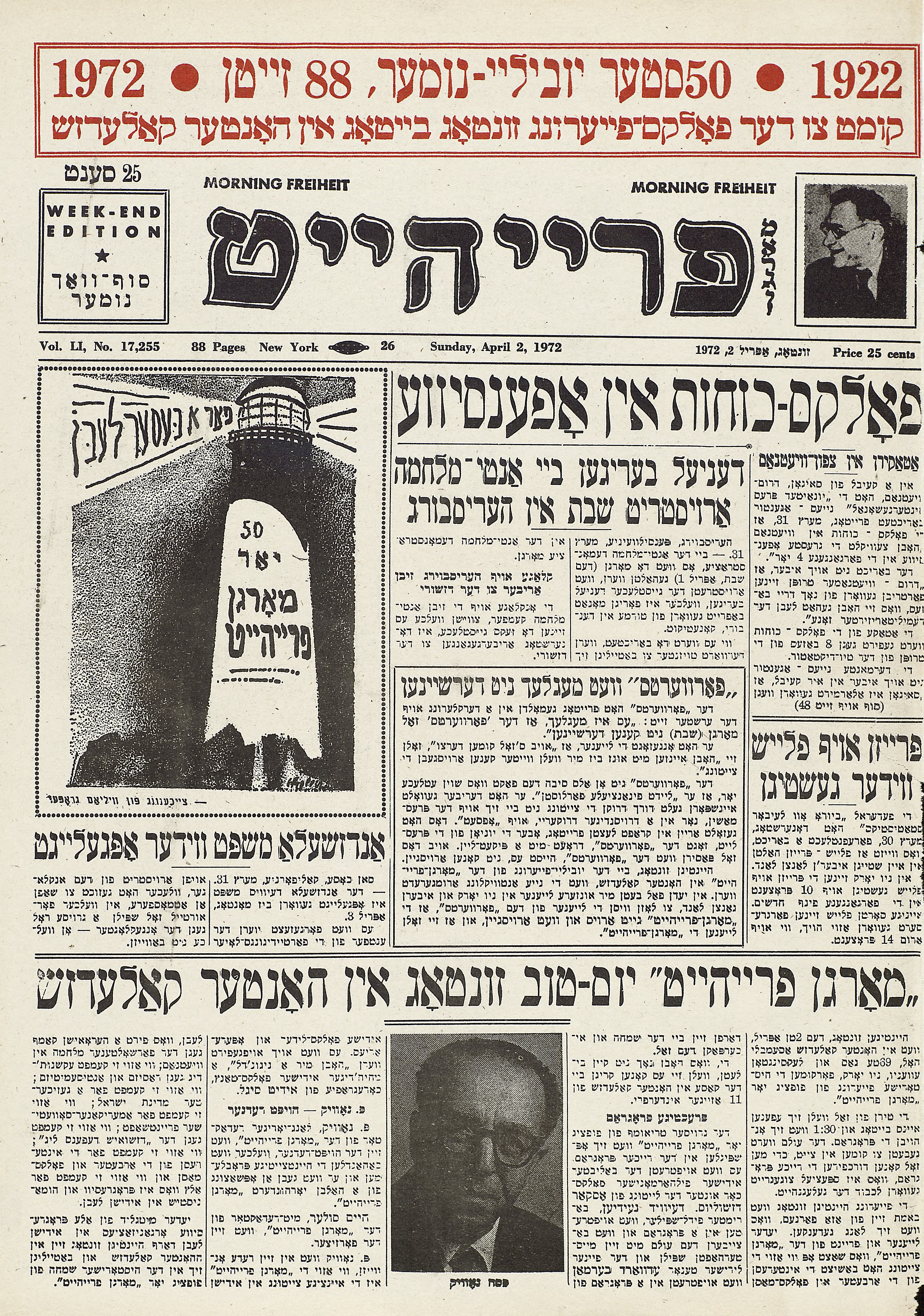
- Front page of the Freiheit's 50th anniversary issue, April 2, 1972
- Type: Daily newspaper
- Founder(s): Moissaye Joseph Olgin; Paul Novick
- Founded: April 2, 1922
- Ceased publication: September 11, 1988
- Political alignment: Left wing to Far left
- Language: Yiddish
- Country: United States

Morgen Freiheit (original title: מאָרגן־פרײהײט; English: Morning Freedom) was a New York City-based daily Yiddish language newspaper affiliated with the Communist Party, USA, founded by Moissaye Olgin in 1922. After the end of World War II the paper's pro-Israel views brought it into disfavor with the Communist Party, and its editor Paul Novick was expelled from the organization. The paper closed in 1988.

== Institutional history ==
=== Establishment ===
The Freiheit was established in 1922 as a self-described "Communistic fighting newspaper" in the Yiddish language. The paper's chief goals included the promotion of the Jewish labor movement, the defense of the Soviet Union, the advancement of proletarian culture, and the defeat of racism in America.

=== Development ===
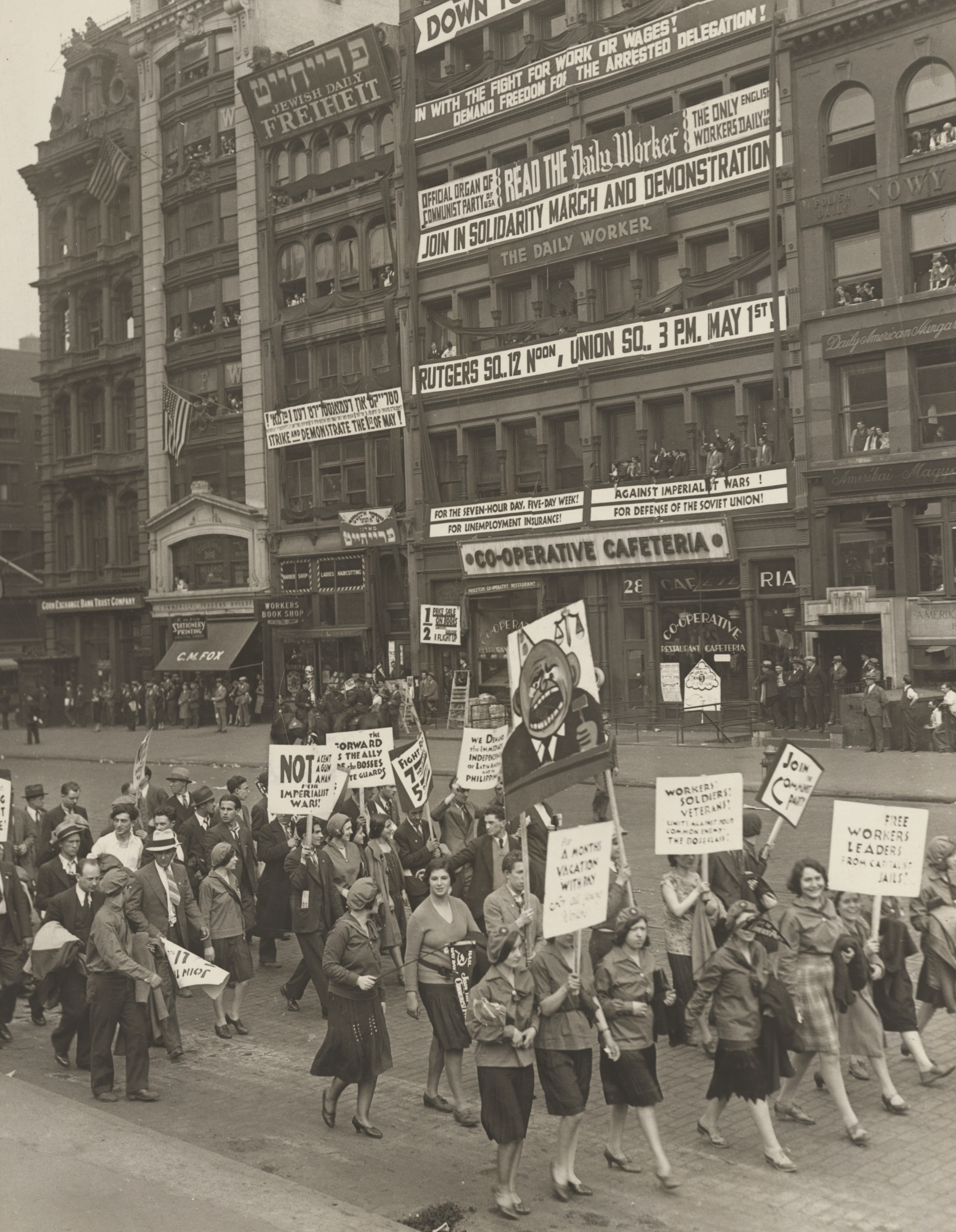
Communists march in front of the Freiheit building during a May Day demonstration c. 1930s

By 1925, the press run of the Freiheit grew to 22,000 copies per issue, making it the largest of nine daily newspapers in the United States affiliated with the American Communist Party.

The Morning Freiheit/Morgen Freiheit in its time was one of the most prominent Yiddish newspapers published in the United States, and the showcase of left socialist artists and writers both Jewish and non-Jewish, Zionist and internationalist. Among the writers to appear in its pages was Michael Gold, the author of the novel Jews Without Money. The newspaper made political contributions related to the formation of the International Fur and Leather Workers Union, as well as many of the needle trades unions in the United States, including the Amalgamated Clothing Workers union, and perhaps the Congress of Industrial Organizations (which later merged with the AFL as the AFL-CIO).

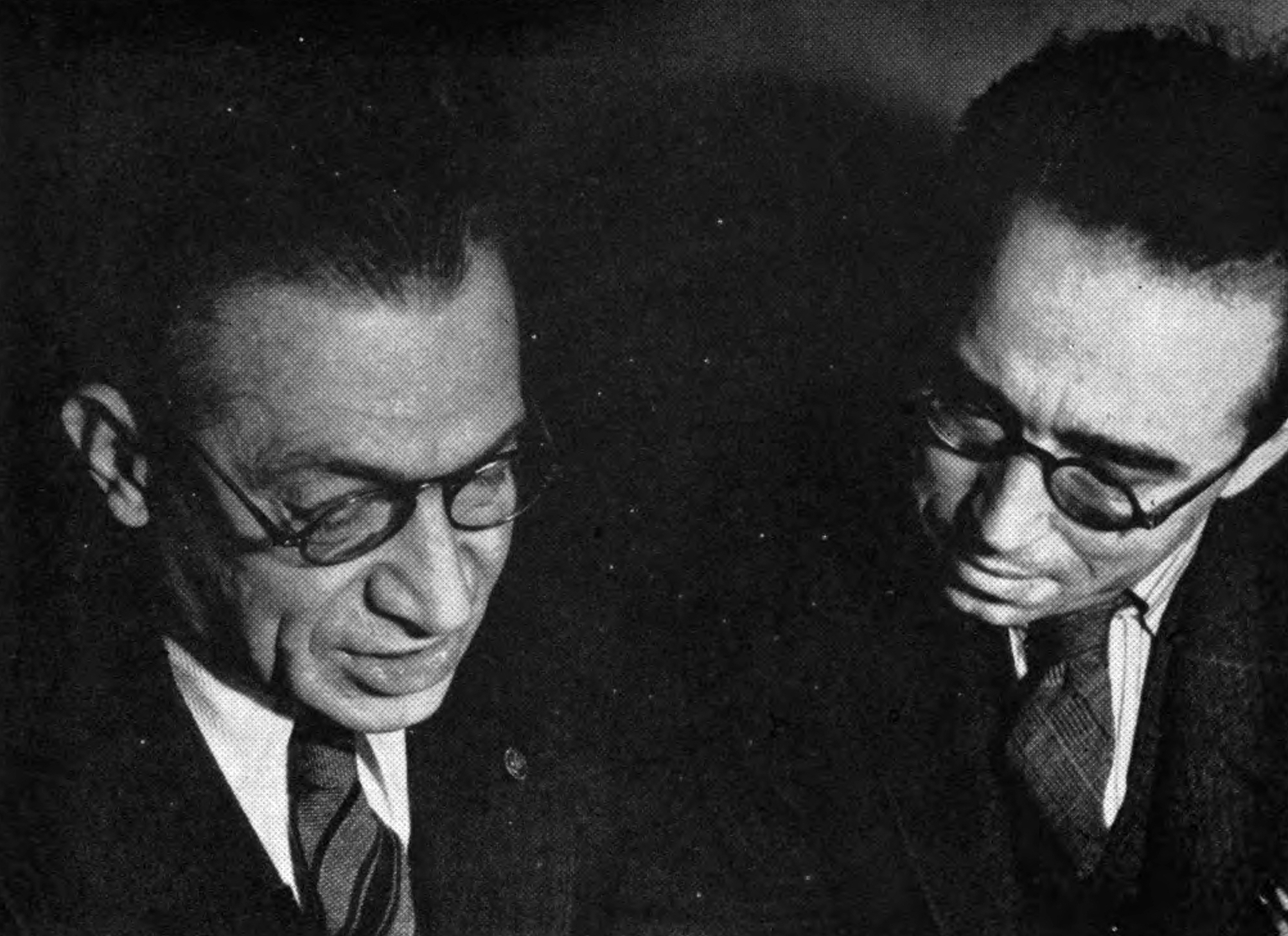
Moissaye J. Olgin (left), editor-in-chief of the Freiheit, and Paul Novick, who succeeded Olgin in that position after his death in 1939.

Following Moissaye Olgin's sudden death in November 1939, the Freiheit was headed by Paul Novick (1891–1989), a journalist born in Brest-Litovsk who had first come to America in 1913. Novick had been associated with the publication from its foundation in 1922 and was active in the ICOR, the American Committee of Jewish Writers, Artists and Scientists, and other Communist Party-sponsored mass organizations.

== Editors-in-Chief ==
- Moissaye Joseph Olgin (1922–1939)
- Paul Novick (1939–1988)

== Associate Editor ==
- Shachno Epstein
- Benjamin Gitlow

== Staff ==
People who wrote for or served on the staff of Morgen Freiheit included:

- Sholem Asch
- David Bergelson
- Alexander Bittelman
- Nathaniel Buchwald
- Yosl Cutler
- Melech Epstein
- Alter Esselin
- Leon Feinberg
- Mike Gold
- William Gropper
- Moyshe-Leyb Halpern
- Leon Josephson
- Shmerke Kaczerginski
- Moyshe Katz
- Leon Kobrin
- H. Leivick
- Blume Lempel
- Jacob Milch
- Moyshe Nadir
- Abraham Regelson
- Morris Schappes
- Leon Talmi
- Morris Winchevsky
- Harry Winitsky

== See also ==
- Non-English press of the Communist Party USA
- List of Yiddish newspapers and periodicals
- Proletpen
- Jewish Currents
- Yiddish Philharmonic Chorus
