= Jewish Socialist Verband =

- Founded: 1921; 105 years ago
- Dissolved: 1980s
- Location: United States of America

The Jewish Socialist Verband (JSV) was a secular Jewish Yiddish-oriented organization founded in the United States of America in 1921 as a result of a political split in the Jewish Socialist Federation (JSF) regarding the Federation's position in support of the Bolshevik Revolution. With the disaffiliation of the JSF from the Socialist Party of America in 1921, the minority opposed to this formed the JSV, which became the SPA's Jewish language federation. Prominent members of the JSV at its foundation included Jacob Panken, Otto Branstetter, Benjamin Feigenbaum, Charles Solomon, Baruch Charney Vladeck, Alexander Kahn and Abraham Cahan (editor of the Jewish Daily Forward).

In 1936 when the Socialist Party split, the JSV joined the "Old Guard" Social Democratic Federation. In 1957 when the SDF reunited with the Socialist Party the JSV and the SDFs largest local, New York, opposed this and founded the Democratic Socialist Federation. In 1972 the DSF and the Socialist Party merged, with the JSV finally re-affiliating with the Socialist Party. The JSV remained affiliated with the Socialist party's legal successor group, the Social Democrats USA. It still was in existence at least until the early 1980s.

== See also ==
- Language federation

== Publications ==
- Hertz, J. S. (Jacob Sholem), 1893- די יידישע סאציאליסטישע באוועגונג אין אמעריקע Di Yidishe sotsyalisṭishe baṿegung in Ameriḳe: 70 yor sotsyalisṭishe ṭeṭiḳayṭ, 30 yor Yidisher Sotsyalisṭisher Farband
