= David Petrovsky =

American socialist politician

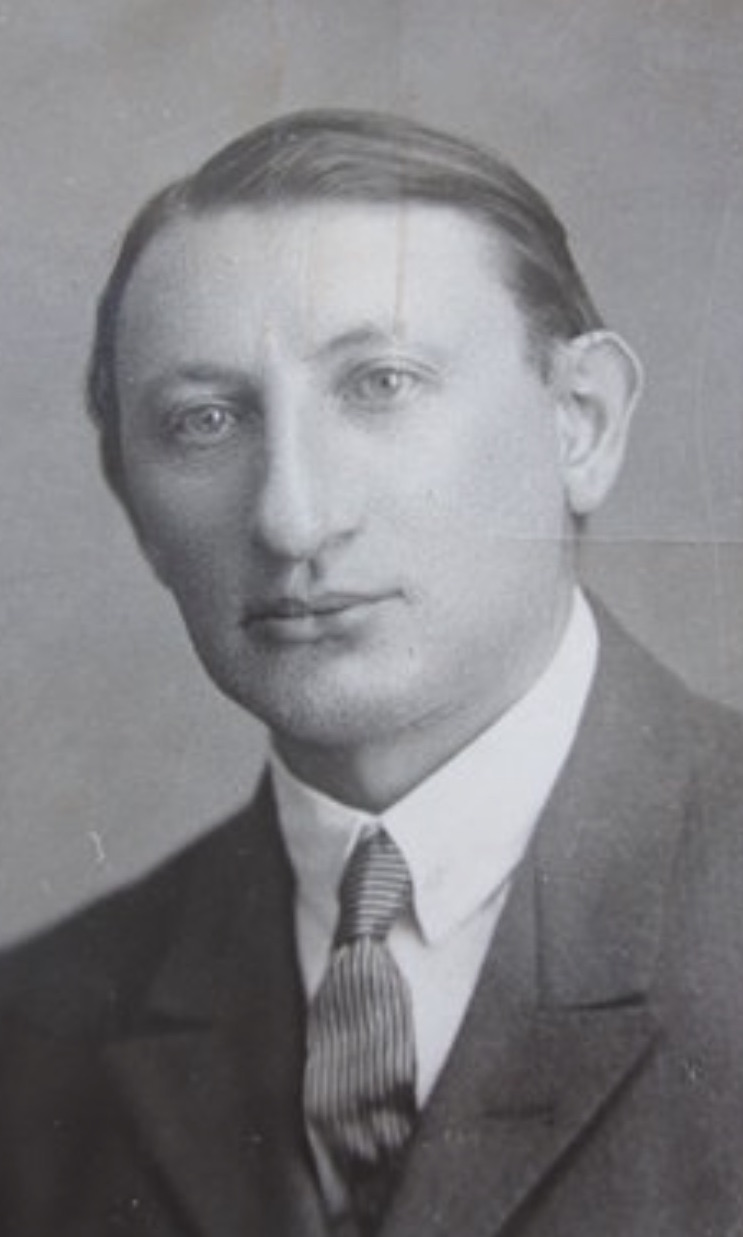
- Petrovsky in 1924
- Born: David Lipetz; September 24, 1886; Berdychiv, Russian Empire
- Died: September 10, 1937 (aged 50); Moscow, Soviet Union
- Cause of death: Execution
- Citizenship: Russian; American
- Education: Doctor of Economics
- Alma mater: Free University of Brussels
- Spouse: Rose Cohen
- Children: Alexey D. Petrovsky

David Petrovsky (born David Lipetz, also known as Max Goldfarb, Bennett, Humboldt, Brown; September 24, 1886 — September 10, 1937) was a Ukrainian Jewish revolutionary politician, economist, journalist, general of the Red Army, and Soviet statesman. He was an active member of the General Jewish Labour Bund in the Russian Empire and the Jewish Socialist Federation in the United States.

In 1912 he received a Ph.D. in economics from the Free University of Brussels where he studied under Emile Vandervelde. He moved to New York in 1913 where served as the editor of the Jewish Daily Forward newspaper in New York until 1917, when he returned to Ukraine to run for the Russian Constituent Assembly. He was elected a member of the Central Council of Ukraine and its Central Executive Committee (Mala Rada), where he voted for the separation of Ukraine from Russia.

He also served as mayor of Berdichev, one of the most important Jewish centers in Ukraine and in the former Russian Empire. As mayor, Petrovsky helped prevent planned pogroms against the Jewish population of the city between 1917 and 1919. In 1919, he joined the Red Army and later became a senior military official responsible for military education in the Soviet Union. From 1919 to 1924, he led the Directorate of Military Education in the Red Army and co-founded the governmental committee for the fight against antisemitism in Soviet Russia and the Soviet Union.

Petrovsky was a member of the Presidium of the Executive Committee of the Communist International from 1924 to 1929 where he was responsible for the formation of communist parties in Great Britain and France. From 1929 to 1937 Petrovsky served as a member of the Presidium of the Supreme Soviet of the National Economy in the Soviet Union. From 1929 to 1937 he headed the General Directorate of Higher and Secondary Technical Education in the Soviet Union where he was responsible for the creation of several hundred universities and technical schools across the Soviet Union that prepared engineers and technical personnel in the accelerated push for the industrialization of the Soviet Union.

Petrovsky was arrested and executed during Stalin’s Great Purge in 1937 in Moscow. He was posthumously rehabilitated in the Soviet Union in 1958 as a victim of political repression.

Throughout his life, Petrovsky (Lipetz) used the following names: Goldfarb, Bennett, Humboldt, and Brown. Each of these names corresponds to a specific period of his life and work.

== Biography ==
=== Early life ===
David Lipetz was born in 1886 in Berdychiv in a family of a wealthy textile merchant Efraim Lipetz. He studied in a Jewish school and at home with private tutors where he finished the Russian classical gymnasium course. He was the chairman of the literary and theatrical society of Berdychiv. He soon became interested in revolutionary activities, and in 1902 he joined the General Jewish Labour Bund in Lithuania, Poland, and Russia (Bund). In 1903 he moved to Paris and enrolled in the Russian Higher School of Social Sciences, where he became acquainted with many of the famous revolutionaries: Vladimir Lenin, Leon Trotsky, Anatoly Lunacharsky.

At the beginning of the 1905 Russian Revolution, he returned to Russia. He worked among workers of Dvinsk, Bialystok, and Gomel, and was one of the leaders of the strike at Libava-Romny railroad. At the 7th Congress of the Bund, where he first used the pseudonym Max Goldfarb, he was elected a candidate for the Central Committee. At the end of 1906, he was arrested by police and spent three months in prison. After that he left Russia - first to England where he participated at the London 5th Congress of the Russian Social Democratic Labour Party, and then to Brussels, where in 1912 he graduated from the Free University of Brussels with a Ph.D. in Economic Sciences (his supervisor was Emile Vandervelde - the future Minister of State of Belgium).

Along with his studies, he lectured (as a member of the Bund) in the cities of Belgium and France. Back in Russia, he was actively engaged in party work. At the end of 1912, he was arrested in Odessa and sentenced to exile to Siberia which was then replaced by exile from Russia.

=== Work in the U.S. ===
Leadership of the Jewish Socialist Federation in 1917. Seated (L-R): Ben-Tsien Hofman (Tsivion), Max Goldfarb, Morris Winchevsky, A. Litvak, Hannah Salutsky, Moishe Terman. Standing: Shauchno Epstein, Frank Rozenblat, Baruch Charney Vladeck, Moissaye Olgin, Jacob Salutsky (J.B.S. Hardman).

By agreement between the Central Committee of the Bund and the Jewish Socialist Federation (JSF) of the Socialist Party of America, in 1913 David Lipetz came to New York City to conduct work among the Jewish workers and to raise funds for the Bund. In America Lipetz worked and published as Max Goldfarb, and under this name he was elected to the Central Committee of the JSF.

He was sent on a national speaking tour under the auspices of the JSF in early 1914. During the tour he addressed more than 15,000 in about 40 engagements according to the report of JSF Secretary Jacob Salutsky. In addition to his role as a functionary of the JSF, Goldfarb worked as labor editor of Abraham Cahan's Yiddish-language daily, Forverts (The Forward).

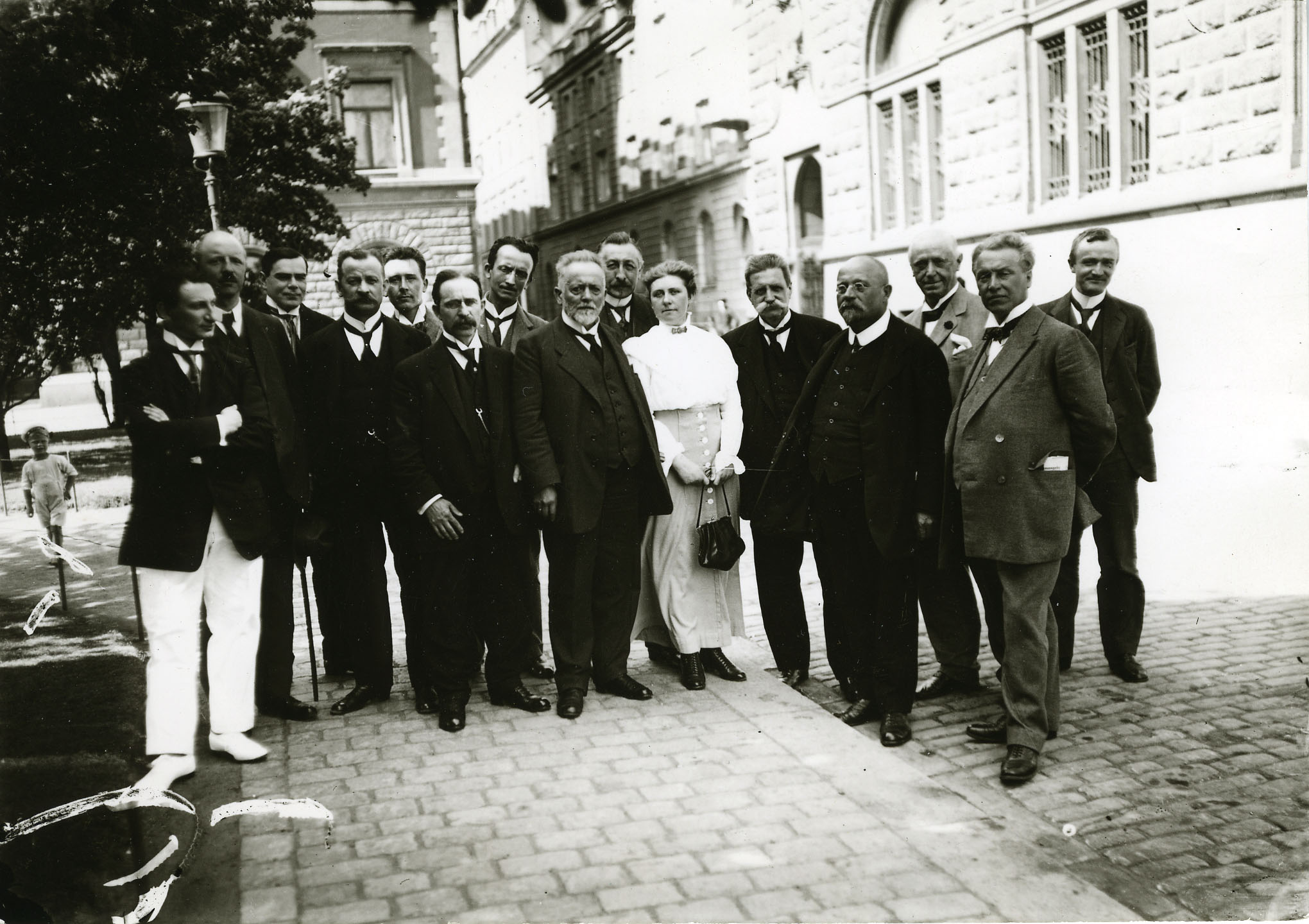
Petrovsky (Max Goldfarb, first from left) at the Stockholm International Socialist Congress, 1917

In the summer 1917 after the bourgeois-democratic February Revolution in Russia, he returned to Russia with a passport in the name of David Lipetz, on the way he stopped in Stockholm at the International Socialist Congress.

=== A member of the Central Council of Ukraine and the last mayor of Berdichev ===
Upon arrival, David Lipetz was actively involved in the political life of Russia and Ukraine: ran for Russian Constituent Assembly election in 1917, wrote political articles in Bund magazines. He was elected the member of the Central Council of Ukraine, was the member of its Central Executive Committee (Mala Rada). He was elected the mayor of the city and chairman of the Jewish community of Berdichev - the city with the largest share of Jewish population in Ukraine and the Russian Empire. In January 1919, David Lipetz survived the pogrom committed by haidamaks from the Kuren Smerti (Clan of Death), which was passing through Berdichev. As mayor of the city at that time he also managed to prevent a planned multi-day pogrom in Berdichev that saved thousands of lives. He was bitterly disappointed in the policy of the Ukrainian People's Republic Government, that encouraged Jewish pogroms. Together with Sore Fox and A. Litvak, David Lipetz headed the Social Democratic Bund in Ukraine (Bund SD) after the split of the Bund in Ukraine in 1918 into communists (Kombund) and social democrats (Bund SD).

=== Heading the military education in Russia and the Soviet Union ===
In April 1919, David Lipetz moved to Kiev, where he met with Mikhail Frunze. David Lipetz started working in the Red Army. He organized the struggle against antisemitism and lectured in the Red Army. At the end of 1919 David Lipetz joined the Bolsheviks. He was one of the founders and a member of the Governmental Committee for the Fight against Antisemitism in Russia and the Soviet Union. The committee included Semyon Dimanstein, Abram Kheifets, Maxim Gorky and other well-known leaders of the revolutionary movement. At the same time David Lipetz entered into a polemic with Vladimir Lenin about the policy of the Bolsheviks regarding the participation of the Jewish population of Ukraine in the work of the state authorities.

From the book of David Petrovsky "Military education in the years of the revolution (1917-1924)": "I was appointed the head of Speakers bureau in the General Directorate of military education (GUVUZ) in fall of 1919. Since the end of 1919 I'm starting to come into contact with the general operational activity of the military educational institutions, first as the head of the political department of GUVUZ (1919 - early 1920), and then as the chief of the General Directorate of military education, from March 1920 to April 1924."

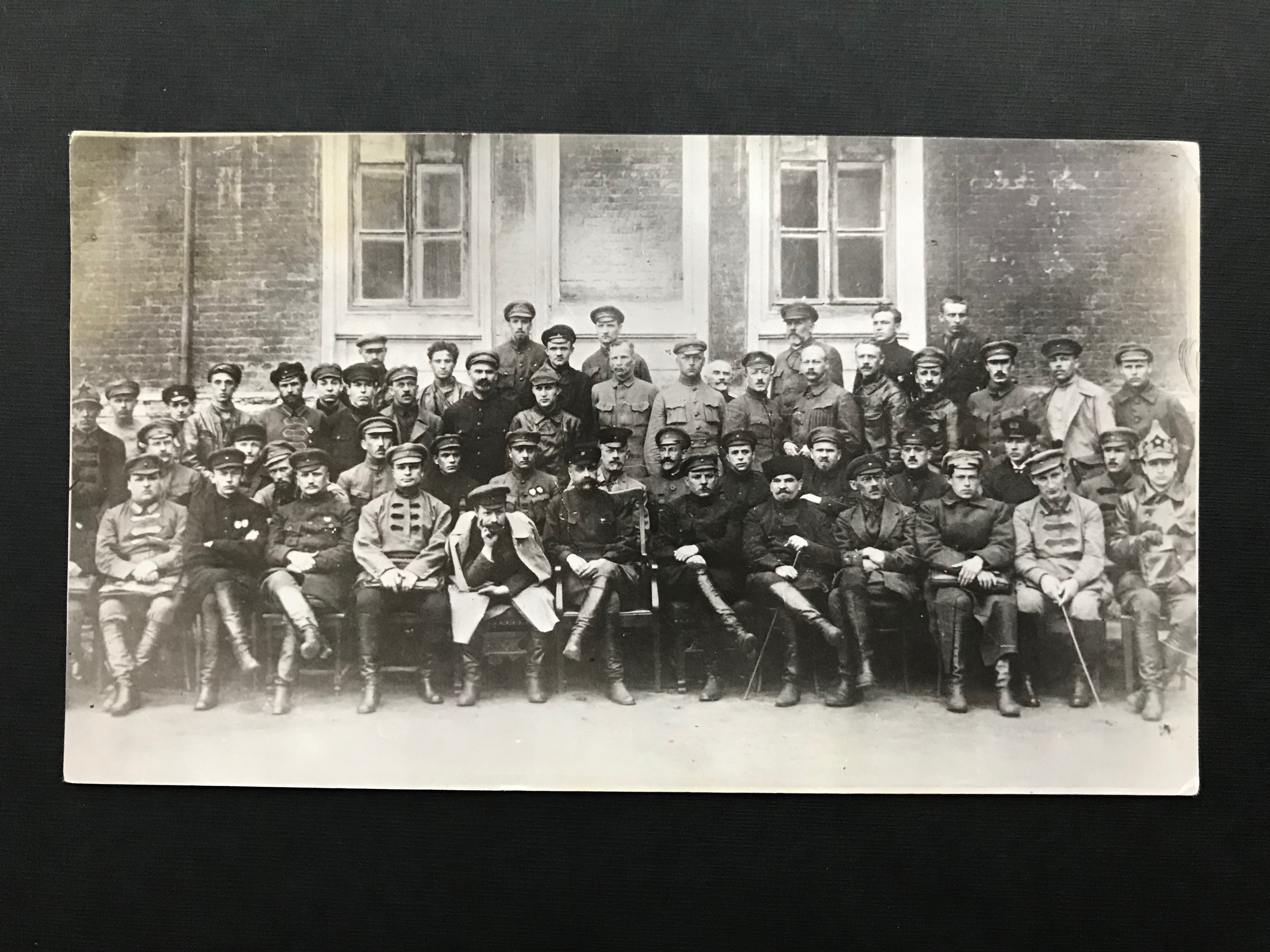
Petrovsky at the meeting of the chief commanders of the Red Army in Moscow, 1922. 1st row standing: 7th Boris Shaposhnikov. 1st row sitting (from left to right): 1st D.P. Oskin, 2nd August Kork, 3rd N.N. Petin, 4th Alexander Yegorov (soldier), 5th Mikhail Frunze, 6th Sergey Kamenev, 7th Kliment Voroshilov, 8th Pavel Pavlovich Lebedev, 9th A.A. Iordanskiy, 10th Iona Yakir, 11th David Petrovsky, 12th Mikhail Tukhachevsky.

David Lipetz became David Petrovsky, or just General Petrovsky. He was responsible for all Soviet military education from 1920 till 1924. Military education in the Russian Empire was destroyed by the Russian Revolution and Russian Civil War. He had a difficult task of rebuilding it during ongoing civil war and unrest, and preparing a young generation in military academies, colleges, and training centers. Some of Petrovsky's ideas were met with resistance, including his idea for the establishment of Soviet military schools for boys. The time for them came only twenty years later, when the Suvorov Military Schools and the Nakhimov Naval Schools were first opened. His point of view on the problems of a single military doctrine caused a sharp controversy between him and Mikhail Frunze.

Yet in 1924 Mikhail Frunze expresses gratitude to him for "the fruitful work done over the matter of raising the military power of the Soviet Union."

=== Work in the Comintern ===
In 1924, David Petrovsky was sent to work in the Communist International as a Communist International representative in the communist parties of Great Britain, France, and the United States. Petrovsky came to England under the name of Bennett, and everyone - even the British Communists and his future wife Rose Cohen considered him American - a Yankee from the East Coast of the United States. He managed to avoid the British police for five years - a remarkable feat, which no subsequent Comintern representative ever equaled. His influence on the British Communist Party was huge. Western intelligence agencies didn't manage to declassify him. In France, he was known as Humboldt, and he had passports in other names as well. He led the Anglo-American Secretariat and controlled the communist movements in Great Britain, Ireland, the U.S., India, South Africa, Canada, Japan, Korea and Dutch Indonesia. He was concerned about the situation of black people in the U.S. and South Africa. In 1928, Petrovsky was elected and served as a member of the presidium of the Executive Committee of the Communist International . "God Goldfarb" - called him old friends in the U.S.

=== Heading the higher and secondary technical education in Russia and the Soviet Union ===
In 1929 Petrovsky was transferred to the Supreme Soviet of the National Economy - a member of the Presidium and the Chief of the General Directorate of Higher and Secondary Technical Education (GLAVVTUZ). His experience in organizing and managing military education (1920-1924) after the revolution in 1917 in Russia was very useful. One of his new tasks was to prepare 435,000 engineers and technicians in 5 years (1930-1935) during the Soviet Union industrialization period, while their number in 1929 was 66,000.

His old party comrades didn't believe that he would succeed with higher and secondary technical education in the Soviet Union, because as a former Bundist, he wouldn't dare to hire former Mensheviks, Socialist Revolutionary Party members, the former right-wing and the Trotskyists (see:Trotskyism), as he could safely hire and appoint only those who knew how to vote according to party lines but not necessarily work.

But he once again proved them wrong. One of the strategies he used in the early 1930s was opening smaller branch institutes on the basis of large multi-faculty educational institutions. For example, on the basis of the Moscow Mining Academy - Moscow Mining Institute (Moscow State Mining University): Geological Prospecting Institute (Russian State Geological Prospecting University), Moscow Oil Institute (Gubkin Russian State University of Oil and Gas), Institute of Steel (National University of Science and Technology MISiS), Institute of Nonferrous Metals and Gold. On the basis of Bauman Moscow State Technical University - Moscow Aviation Institute, Moscow Power Engineering Institute, Moscow University of Civil Engineering, and other institutions in the Soviet Union. From 1930 to 1940, the number of higher and secondary technical colleges and institutions in the Soviet Union grew by 4 times and exceeded 150.

=== A failed escape ===
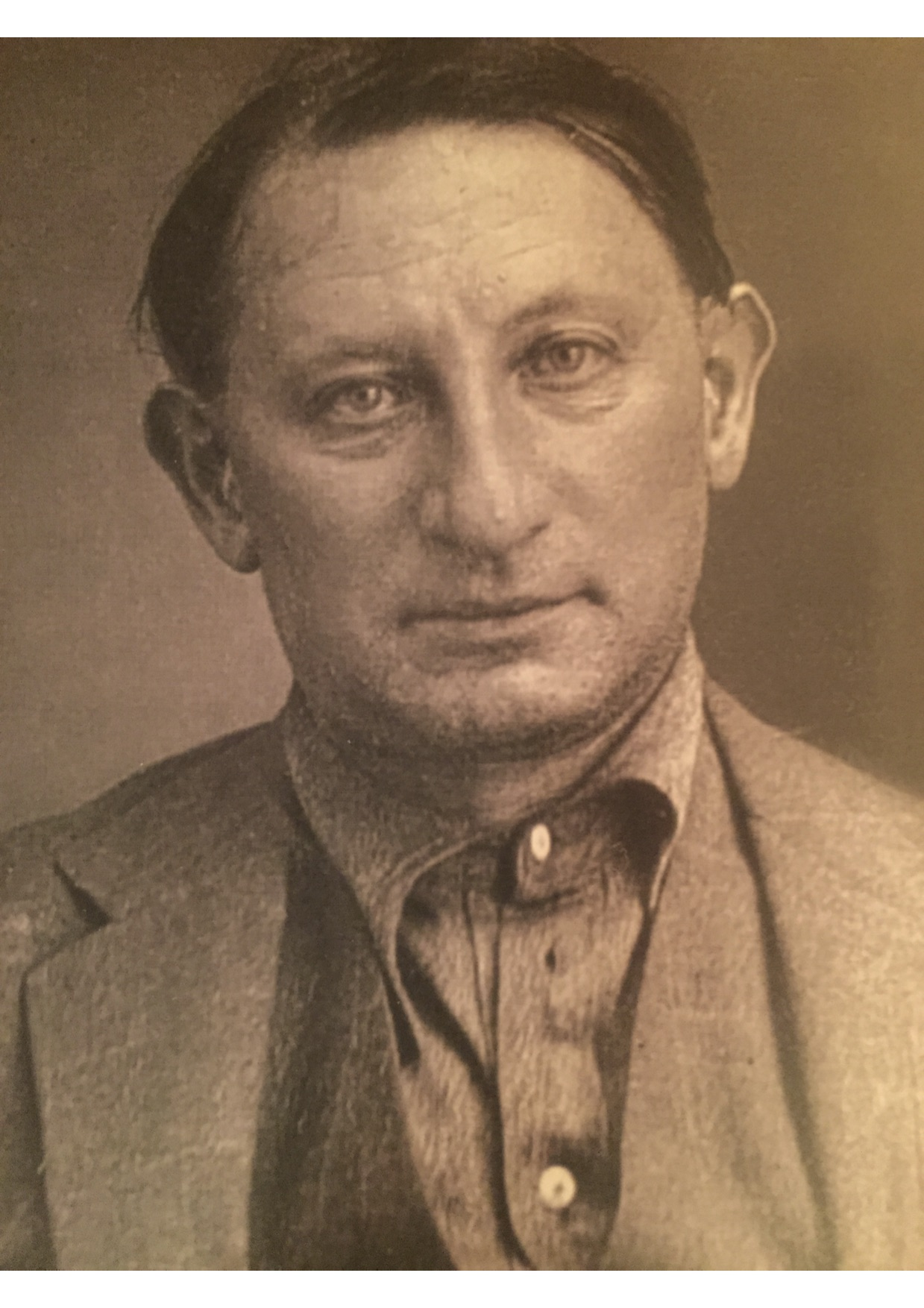
David Petrovsky (a prison photo), 1937

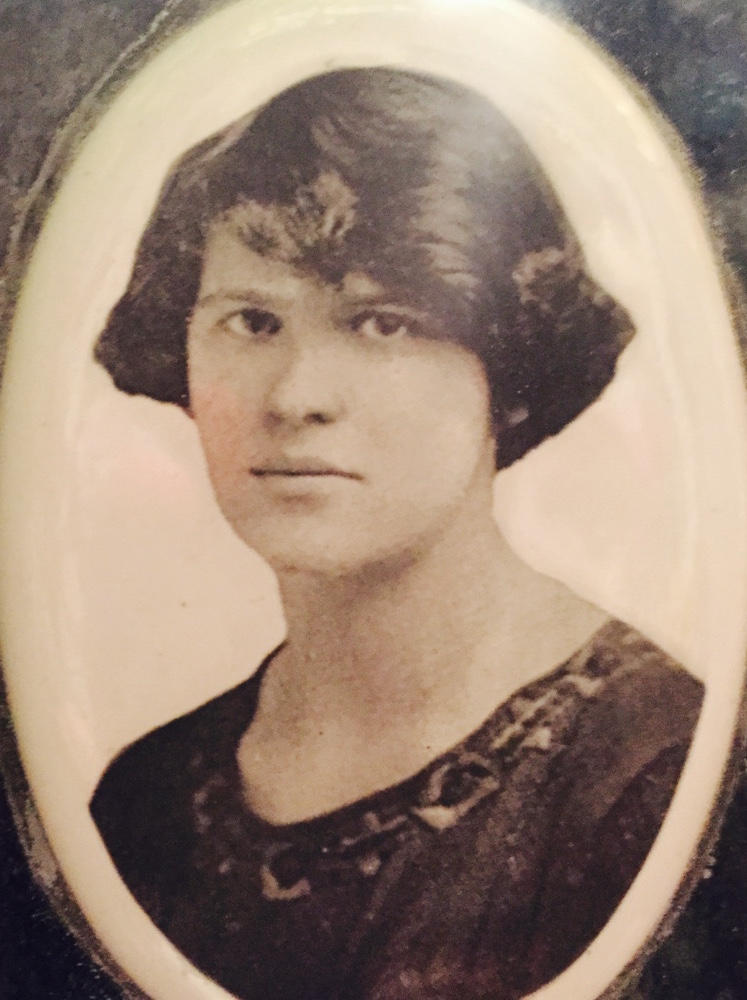
Rose Cohen

David Petrovsky was aware of the danger emerging in the Soviet Union following the murder of Sergei Kirov in 1934, the assassination functioned as the catalyst for the Great Purge.

In the summer of 1936, his London-born wife Rose Cohen went to London but was not permitted to make the trip with her son Alyosha, so he stayed behind. Her sister Nellie thought that Rose was "unhappy, and had it not been for Alyosha might not have returned".

At that time David Petrovsky planned a business trip to America and got permission to travel abroad from his supervisor Sergo Ordzhonikidze - the head of the Supreme Soviet of the National Economy and the head of the People's Commissariat of Heavy Industry of the Soviet Union. Sergo Ordzhonikidze, who knew Stalin closely, more than anyone else, saw what was happening in the country. Anticipating his fate, he wanted to save Petrovsky from the Stalin's terror and understood that he most likely would not return from a business trip. It seems that David and Rosa hoped to use their travels as an opportunity to leave almost simultaneously from the country and be saved. However, they had failed to acquire an exit visa for their son, and unwilling to leave without him, they remained in the Soviet Union.

=== Arrest and execution ===
In February 1937, Sergo Ordzhonikidze died. In March 1937, David Petrovsky was arrested (as the head of the General Directorate of higher and secondary technical education in the People's Commissariat of Heavy Industry of the Soviet Union), and was accused of "counterrevolutionary" activity, and shot on September 10, 1937. In August 1937, his London-born wife Rose Cohen, a former Comintern courier, was arrested as an alleged British spy, and on November 28, 1937, she was also shot (rehabilitated in the Soviet Union in 1956). Rose Cohen was the head of the foreign department and the editor in the "Moscow Daily News" (The Moscow News) newspaper. Their seven-year-old son Alexey Petrovsky (Alyosha) was placed in an orphanage with the label "son of the enemies of the people."

=== Political rehabilitation ===
After the 20th Congress of the Communist Party of the Soviet Union (1956), Petrovsky's only son filed an appeal to review his case, and on January 25, 1958, the Military Collegium of the Soviet Union Supreme Court invalidated the September 10, 1937 ruling against Petrovsky. All charges were dropped and the case was dismissed for lack of corpus delicti. Petrovsky was posthumously rehabilitated as a victim of political repression.

=== Family ===
He married Rose Cohen (1894-1937) a British feminist and suffragist, a founder member of the Communist Party of Great Britain. David Petrovsky and Rose Cohen had a son – Alexey Petrovsky (Alyosha). Alexey spent three years living in the orphanage after his parents' execution in 1937. In 1940 he was adopted from the orphanage by David Petrovsky's cousin Rebecca Belkina, a doctor, and a major of armed forces medical service during the Second World War. She succeeded in getting permission for Alyosha's adoption when she lived with her family in a political exile in Tobolsk, Siberia under the Article 58 of the Soviet Penal Code. Alexey spent the rest of his childhood living in Siberia with her and her family. Afterward, many years later, Alexey D. Petrovsky (1929–2010) earned a Ph.D. in Engineering, Ph.D. in Geological and Mineralogical Sciences, and became an Academician of the Russian Academy of Natural Sciences. Their grandson, Michael A. Petrovsky, holds a Ph.D. in Physics and Mathematics.

== Proceedings ==
David Petrovsky is the author of many publications, including more than ten monographs. The most significant works:

- Military education in the years of the revolution (1917-1924), M. 1924.
- The revolution and the counterrevolution in Ukraine, M. 1920.
- Capitalism and socialism (from Thomas More to Lenin), M. 1920 - the book is stored in the memorial office-library of Lenin in the Moscow Kremlin, Russia.
- The class struggle in postwar England, M. 1928.

== Memory ==
Honorary cadet of the Moscow Higher Military Command School of the Russian Armed Forces.
