= Jewish Socialist Federation =

Leadership of the Jewish Socialist Federation in 1917. Seated (L-R): Ben-Tsien Hofman (Tsivion), Max Goldfarb, Morris Winchevsky, A. Litvak, Hannah Salutsky, Moishe Terman. Standing: Shauchno Epstein, Frank Rozenblat, Baruch Charney Vladeck, Moissaye Olgin, Jacob Salutsky (J.B.S. Hardman).

The Jewish Socialist Federation (JSF) was a secular Jewish Yiddish-oriented organization founded in 1912 which acted as a language federation in the Socialist Party of America (SPA). Many of the founding members of the JSF had previously been members of the Bund in Eastern Europe and sought to bring Bundist politics to the socialist movement in the USA.

The JSF split in 1921 over the question of the Bolshevik Revolution, with the organization disaffiliating from the SPA and a minority splitting to form a new organization called the Jewish Socialist Verband (JSV) and remaining affiliated to the SPA. The newly independent JSF soon joined the Workers Party of America (legal arm of the underground Communist Party of America) and merged into a previously existing Jewish Communist Federation of that organization.

== History ==
=== Background ===
Scholars have commonly dated the origin of the Jewish labor movement in the United States to the decade of the 1880s.

There were quantitative reasons for this date of origin. Tsar Alexander II was assassinated by a bomb on March 13, 1881, which ushered in a wave of official and popular antisemitic violence known as pogroms in which individuals were killed, cultural institutions sacked, and property destroyed. The reaction raged at its most extreme in the years 1881 and 1882, during which there were scores of violent events throughout the southern and western regions of the Russian empire in which Jews were permitted to dwell. A wave of emigration followed, with the number of Jewish immigrants to the United States rocketing from less than 35,000 for the entire decade of the 1870s to more than 175,000 during the decade of the 1880s.

Jewish emigration, particularly from the violent and antisemitic Russian empire continued to accelerate during the decade of the 1890s, with more than one out of every ten new arrivals in the United States of Jewish ethnicity during those years.

=== Antecedents ===
Early Jewish Socialist political organization in the United States kept its eyes and agenda focused abroad, as American affiliates of the General Jewish Labor Bund, a revolutionary organization seeking the overthrow of tsarism in the Russian empire. The first such American branch of the Bund was formed in 1900 and within five years about 50 such American Bund affiliates were formed, united under the umbrella of a group called the Central Union of Bund Organizations. In addition to their Eastern European focus, centered around the raising and transmission of funds to the Russian revolutionary movement, these American Bund groups advocated Jewish cultural and political autonomy rather than assimilation into the domestic orientation of the anglophonic Socialist Party of America (SPA).

From 1905 many local Yiddish-language organization were loosely coordinated by a group called the Jewish Socialist Agitation Bureau, founded by a tailor from Rochester, New York named Max Kaufman. Kaufman's Agitation Bureau was envisioned as a mechanism for bringing prominent Yiddish-language socialists from New York City to address Jewish communities in Rochester, Buffalo, Syracuse, and elsewhere in the Northeast. This effort proved successful, with such socialist notables as economist Isaac Hourwich and politician Meyer London sponsored on speaking tours. The Bureau also coordinated the distribution of leaflets and pamphlets in the Yiddish language.

The Socialist Agitation Bureau met in convention annually, with the established network of Bundist clubs playing a key role in the organization's expansion. By 1909 it was estimated that between 80 and 90 percent of the affiliates of the Bureau maintained Bundist ties.

=== Establishment of the JSF ===
The American urban working class was largely an immigrant population in the early years of the 20th century and the Socialist Party of America sought to improve its connection with non-English-speaking workers through the expansion of its language federations — semi-autonomous parallel organizations coordinating the activity of party branches speaking a common language and expediting the distribution of pamphlets and leaflets in that tongue.

In contrast to the dozens of independent Finnish-language socialist clubs which joined en bloc to establish the Finnish Socialist Federation of the SPA in 1906, the Jewish Socialist Federation was created largely through the initiative of the Socialist Party itself. Socialist Party branches conducting their business in Yiddish existed as regular units of the state and national Socialist Party, paying full dues to those party organizations and differing from English-language branches only in the language in which they conducted their business.

As early as 1907, Jewish Socialist Agitation Bureau founder Max Kaufman proposed the establishment of a Yiddish language federation within the Socialist Party — although this proposal was initially shot down by doctrinaire Jewish socialists as an unacceptable compromise with ethnic nationalism rather than class-based internationalism. One prominent Jewish socialist was quick to dismiss the idea of a semi-autonomous Jewish federation paralleling the Bund with the assertion that "in America special Russian Jewish wounds do not exist; thus, here in America there can be no place and no value for special Russian Jewish remedies."

Nevertheless, sentiment seeking organization of Yiddish-language Socialist branches continued to develop.

A major step towards language autonomy was taken in the summer of 1910 when the SPA's constitution was amended to entitle any non-English language group with 500 or more dues paying members to federation status with a paid official called a "Translator-Secretary" granted an office at party headquarters in Chicago. Over the next two years SPA Federations had been launched for the party's Czech, Hungarian, Italian, Polish, Swedish/Norwegian, and Slovenian members, joined in 1912 with the formation of the Yiddish-language Jewish Socialist Federation.

Many or most ethnic Jews in the SPA were not members of the Jewish Socialist Federation, instead participating in English-language branches. Indeed, some of these disapproved of the Jewish Federation, preferring promotion of the process of "Americanization" and integration into American political life over the semi-autonomous federation approach — which was characterized by activist and historian Will Herberg as "virtually a Jewish Socialist Party within the...Party." While tactically useful in coordinating socialist propaganda in the native language of immigrant workers, the implicit emphasis of ethnicity over social class of the federation approach seemed to many a departure from the traditional socialist principle of internationalism.

=== Development ===
The Jewish Socialist Federation grew rapidly, soon numbering some 65 geographic branches with a membership approaching 3,000. Despite the cultural orientation behind its organization, the Jewish Federation attracted some of the most radical Jewish socialists to its ranks, soon emerging to the left of the Socialist Party itself.

== See also ==
- Language federation
- Jewish Socialist Verband
