= Rose Cohen =

English communist (1894–1937)

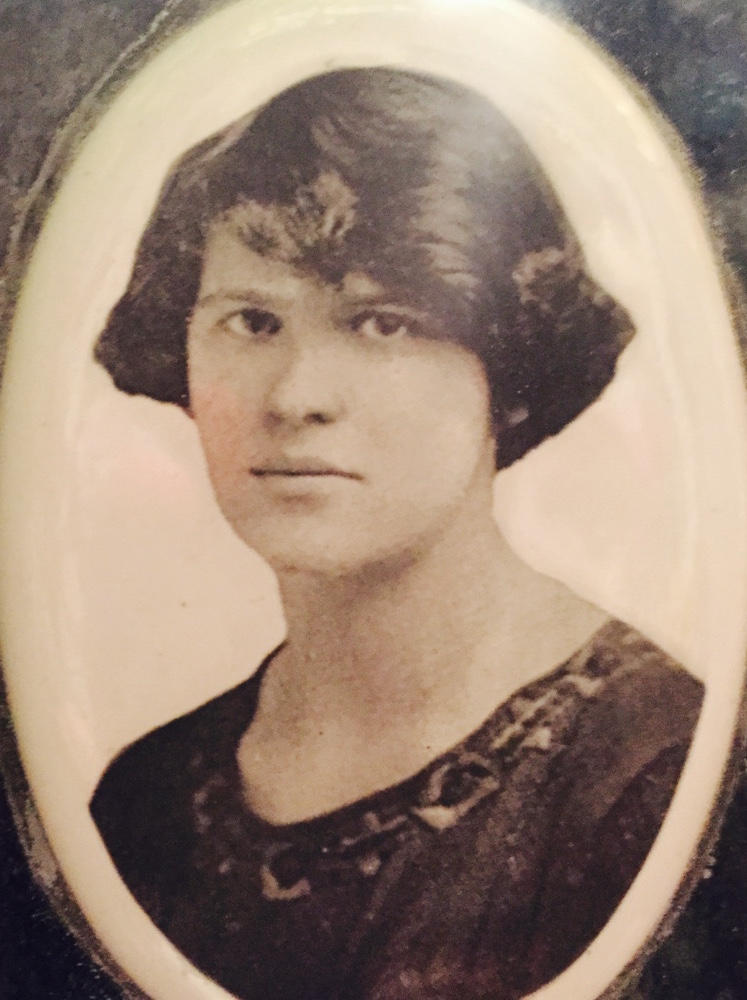
- Born: Rose Cohen; 20 May 1894; East End, London, England
- Died: 28 November 1937 (aged 43); Moscow, Soviet Union
- Cause of death: Execution
- Citizenship: British
- Education: Workers' Educational Association; International Lenin School
- Occupations: Journalist, employee of the comintern, newspaper editor, suffragist
- Employer(s): London County Council; Labour Research Department; Moscow Daily News
- Organization(s): East London Federation of Suffragettes; Communist International
- Political party: Communist Party of Great Britain; Communist Party of the Soviet Union
- Spouse: David Petrovsky (m. 1929)
- Children: Alexey D. Petrovsky
- Relatives: Abraham Cohen (cousin)

Rose Cohen (Russian: Роза Морисовна Коэн, romanized: Roza Morisovna Koen; 20 May 1894 – 28 November 1937) was an English feminist, suffragist, and founding member of the Communist Party of Great Britain in 1920. She worked for Communist International (Comintern) from 1920 to 1929. Between 1931 and 1937, Cohen served as a foreign editor of The Moscow News. She was executed during the Great Purge in the Soviet Union and posthumously rehabilitated in the Soviet Union in 1956.

== Biography ==
=== Early life ===
Rose Cohen was born in 1894 in London's East End to a family of Jewish immigrants from Łódź, Poland. Her father, Maurice Cohen, was a tailor who later opened his own business and prospered. She was the first cousin of Abraham Cohen and the first cousin once removed of Morris Wartski, both through her father's side. Through the Workers' Educational Association Cohen became well-versed in economics and politics, and fluent in three languages.

After leaving the family home, Rose lived with her sister Nellie, Daisy Lansbury and May O’Callaghan in a shared flat on Grays Inn Road, London. In the 1910s, Rose and Nellie became active members of the East London Federation of Suffragettes led by Sylvia Pankhurst. (Nellie worked as Sylvia Pankhurst's personal secretary). By 1916, British intelligence had placed Rose Cohen under surveillance. Transcripts of intercepted letters and phone calls became publicly available in 2003.

Her education allowed Rose Cohen to get a job at London County Council, where she worked until 1917, and later in the Labour Research Department. She served as a secretary to Beatrice Webb and Sidney Webb. She left the Labour Research Department in 1920. Towards the end of the First World War, the department became the centre of the young leftist intellectuals. In his memoirs Maurice Reckitt wrote that Cohen "had great vivacity and charm... and was probably the most popular individual in our little movement..." In 1920 she became a founding member of the Communist Party of Great Britain (CPGB).

Contemporaries described Cohen as lively, intelligent, educated, and beautiful. Among Cohen's admirers, Harry Pollitt was the most persistent. A photograph of Cohen at the People's History Museum in the United Kingdom was inscribed by Pollitt: "Rose Cohen – who I am in love with, and who has rejected me 14 times."

=== Work in the Comintern ===
In the early 1920s, Cohen travelled the world as a Comintern agent. She was assigned secret missions, which included delivering messages and transferring money to Communist parties. In 1922–23 she spent long periods in the Soviet Union, and also travelled to Finland, Germany, Lithuania, Estonia, Latvia, Turkey, France, Norway, Sweden and Denmark. As a Comintern courier, Cohen transferred large sums of money to the Communist parties of these countries.

In 1925, Cohen worked in the Soviet embassy in London and also spent several months in Paris on a secret mission for the Comintern, and handled large sums of money for the Communist Party of France. That year, she met David Petrovsky, whom she later married.

=== Life in Moscow ===
In 1927, following instructions from the Central Committee of the Communist Party of Great Britain, Cohen went to work in Moscow, and in the same year, she joined the Communist Party of the Soviet Union.

In the beginning of 1929, Cohen married Petrovsky, and in December 1929 she gave birth to their son Alexey (Alyosha). She spent six months that year overseas, travelling to China, Japan, Poland, and Germany on Comintern business.

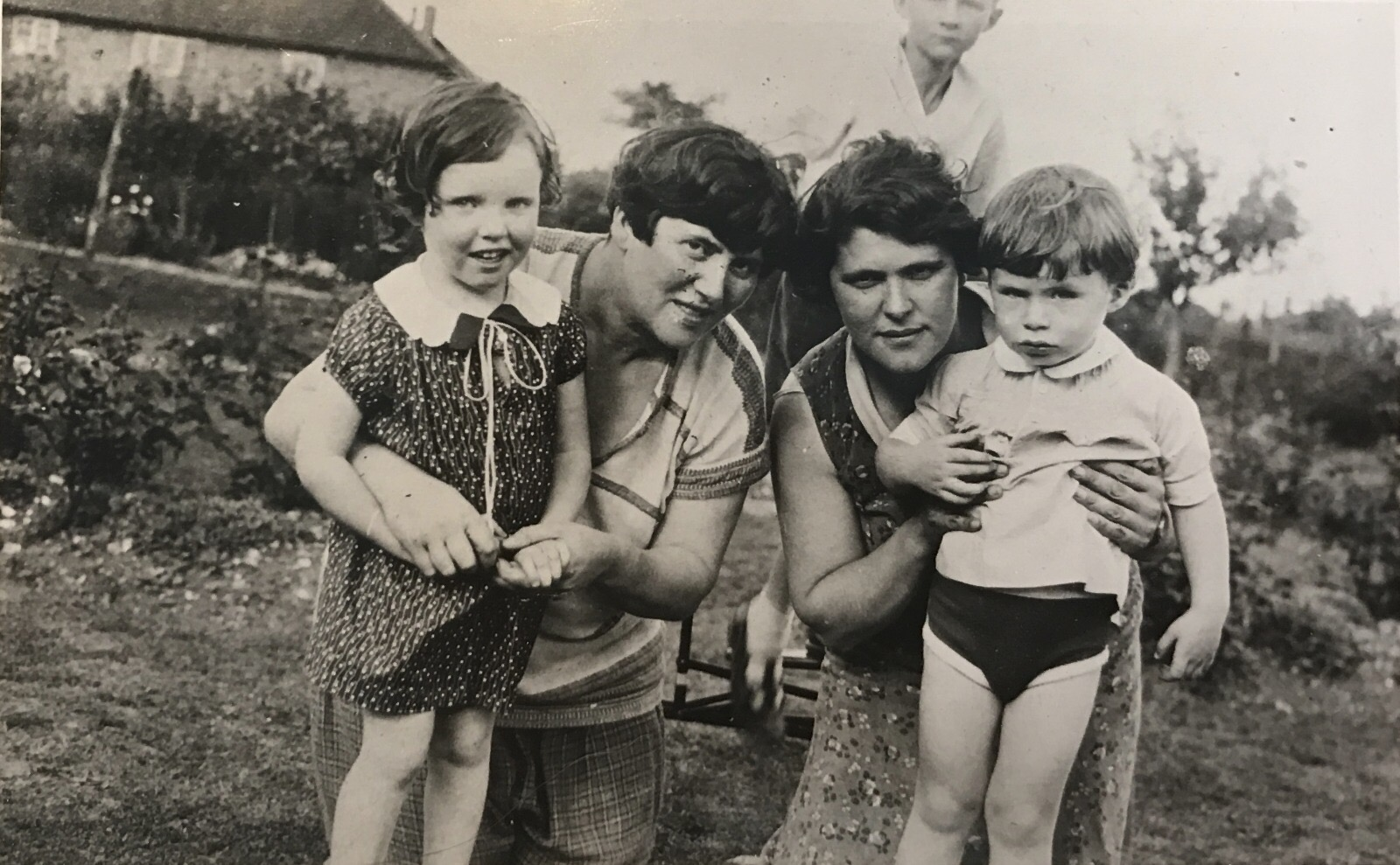
Cohen and her son Alyosha (on right). London, 1932

In 1930, Cohen enrolled at the International Lenin School of the Comintern, and from 1931 she was an employee and later chief of the Foreign Department and the editor of the Moscow Daily News. Cohen and Petrovsky were considered the "golden couple of the expatriate community in Moscow", and their apartment became a salon for the foreign community.

=== The victim of Stalin's terror ===
Petrovsky was aware of the danger emerging in the Soviet Union following the murder of Sergei Kirov in 1934, the assassination that functioned as the catalyst for the Great Purge.

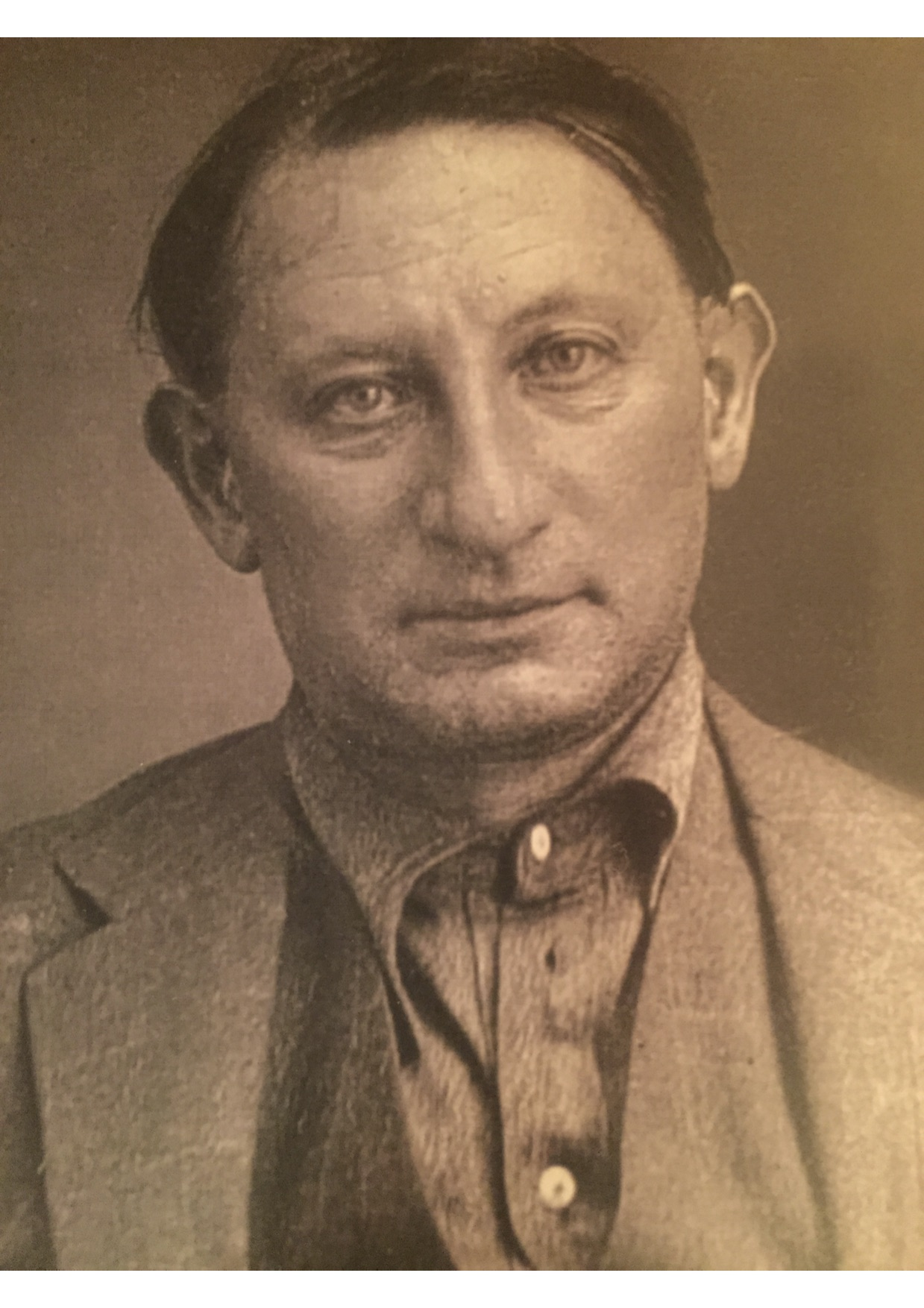
David Petrovsky (a prison photo), 1937

In the summer of 1936, Cohen went to London but was not permitted to make the trip with her son, Alyosha, so he stayed behind. Her sister Nellie thought that Rose was "unhappy, and had it not been for Alyosha might not have returned".

At that time Petrovsky was planning a business trip to America and got permission to travel abroad from his supervisor Sergo Ordzhonikidze – the head of the Supreme Soviet of the National Economy and the head of the People's Commissariat of Heavy Industry of the Soviet Union. Sergo Ordzhonikidze, who knew Stalin closely, more than anyone else, saw what was happening in the country. Anticipating his fate, he wanted to save Petrovsky from Stalin's terror and understood that he most likely would not return from a business trip. It seems that Rosa and David hoped to use their travels as an opportunity to leave Russia almost simultaneously and be saved. However, they had failed to acquire an exit visa for their son, and unwilling to leave without him, they remained in the Soviet Union.

In February 1937, Ordzhonikidze died. In March 1937, Petrovsky was arrested, and Cohen was expelled from the Russian Communist Party. On 13 August she was arrested in Moscow. Cohen was accused of being: "a member of the anti-Soviet organization in the Comintern, spying for Great Britain, and the resident of British intelligence".

She denied all charges until 29 October 1937. A closed court hearing started at 2:20 pm on 28 November. Cohen was not given access to defence counsel or witnesses, "in accordance with the Law of 1 December 1934". She "pleaded not guilty, denied all charges, and refused to confirm her testimony given during the preliminary investigation, claiming it was false". In her final statement she again pleaded not guilty. However, the ruling handed down twenty minutes after the start of legal proceedings declared Cohen guilty. That same day, Cohen was shot.

Petrovsky was shot on 10 September 1937 (rehabilitated in the Soviet Union in 1958). Their seven-year-old son, Alyosha, was placed in an orphanage with the label "son of the enemies of the people". Rose's sister and brothers told everyone that Rose and Alyosha died in Russia of pneumonia and forgot about him for 50 years.

=== British reaction ===
Having learned of Cohen's arrest, British communist leaders Harry Pollitt and Willie Gallacher appealed to the Secretary General of the Executive Committee of the Communist International, Georgi Dimitrov, and his deputy Dmitry Manuilsky, and were advised "do not interfere". As a result, the Communist Party of Great Britain did not file a protest, and was not supportive of the protest launched in the pages of the New Statesman, via a letter written by Maurice Reckitt. The inquiries of Beatrice Webb and Sidney Webb about Rose Cohen remained unanswered.

The British government did not deny rumours that Cohen had taken Soviet citizenship, and had been a citizen of the Soviet Union at the time of her arrest. Soviet records show that Cohen did not naturalise as a Soviet citizen. The British Embassy's protest was late and was officially expressed only in April 1938.

The CPGB opposed efforts by the British government to get Cohen released, describing her arrest as an internal affair of the Soviet Union. Pollitt privately tried to intervene on her behalf, but by the time he did so she had already been shot. Twenty years after Cohen's death, Pollitt requested information from Moscow about whether she was still alive.

=== Political rehabilitation and family ===
After the 20th Congress of the Communist Party of the Soviet Union (February 1956), Cohen's son filed an appeal to review her case. On 18 July 1956 the General Secretary of the Communist Party of Great Britain, Harry Pollitt, sent a letter to the First Secretary of the Communist Party of the Soviet Union, Nikita Khrushchev, with a request to clarify the situation regarding the arrest of Rose Cohen in 1937 and asking what had happened to her after the arrest.

On 8 August 1956, the Military Collegium of the Soviet Union Supreme Court invalidated the 28 November 1937 ruling against Cohen. All charges were dropped and the case was dismissed for lack of corpus delicti. Cohen was posthumously rehabilitated as a victim of political repressions.

Cohen and David Petrovsky's son, Alyosha, spent three years living in the orphanage after his parents' execution in 1937. In 1940 he was adopted from the orphanage by David Petrovsky's cousin Rebecca Belkina, a doctor, and a major of the armed forces' medical service during the Second World War. She succeeded in getting permission for Alyosha's adoption when she lived with her family in political exile in Tobolsk, Siberia under Article 58 of the Soviet Penal Code. Alyosha spent the rest of his childhood living in Siberia with her and her family. Afterward, many years later, he earned a PhD in Engineering, PhD in Geological and Mineralogical Sciences, and became an Academician of the Russian Academy of Sciences. Their grandson, Michael A. Petrovsky, holds a PhD in Physics and Mathematics.

== Sources ==
Beckett, Francis (2004). Stalin's British Victims: The Story Of Rosa Rust. Stroud, Gloucestershire: The History Press. ISBN 9780750932233.
