= Morris Winchevsky =

Lithuanian-born Jewish socialist activist

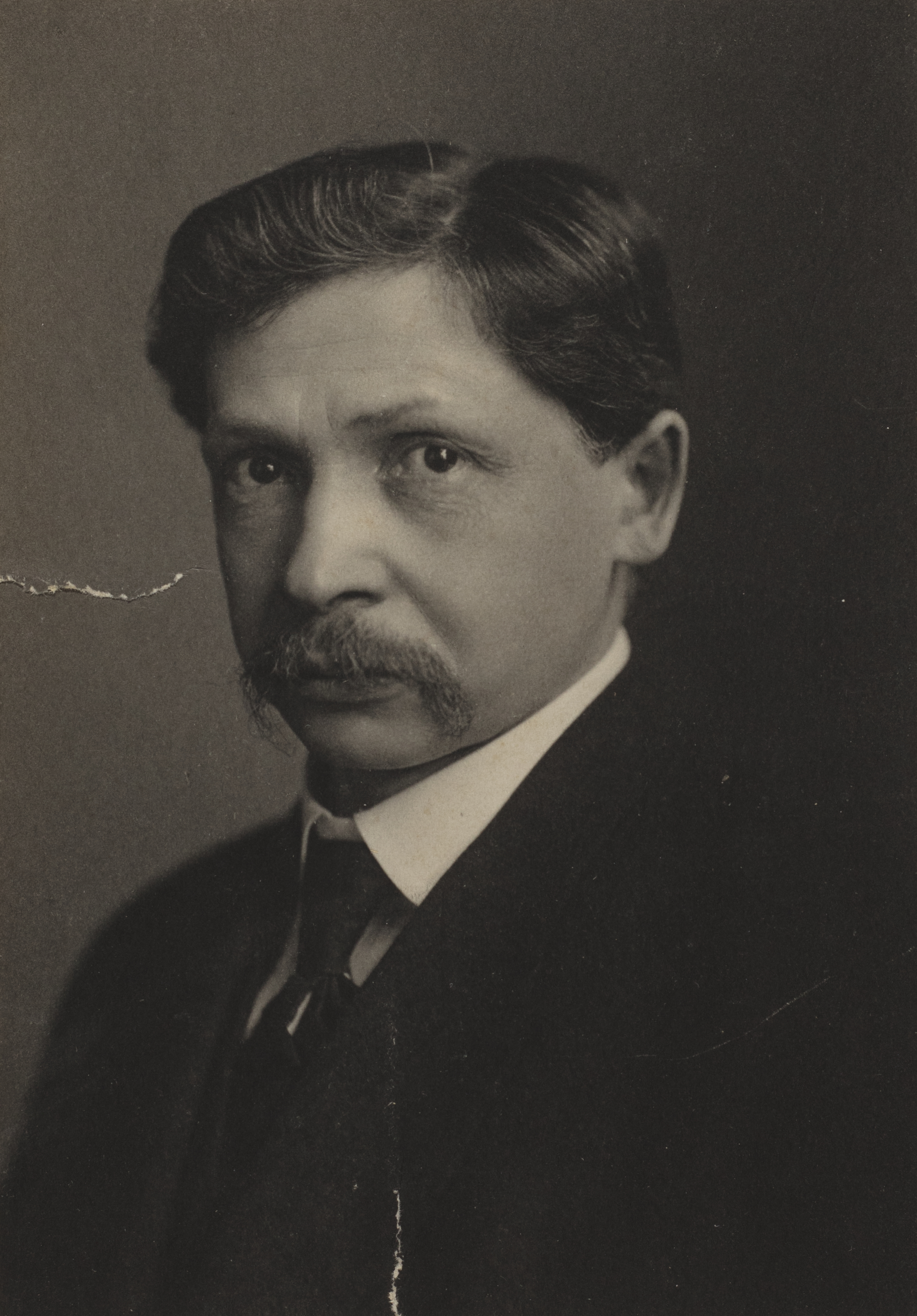
- Winchevsky in 1907
- Born: Leopold Benzion Novokhovitch; August 9, 1856; Jonava, Lithuania
- Died: March 18, 1932 (aged 75); New York City
- Occupations: Newspaper editor, poet
- Writing career
- Pen name: Ben Netz
- Language: Yiddish, English, Polish

Morris Winchevsky (Yiddish: מאָריס װינטשעװסקי; born as Leopold Benzion Novokhovitch; August 9 1856–March 18 1932), also known as Ben Netz, was born in Jonava, Lithuania, and grew up in nearby Kovne. He had a varied early life during which he moved to Königsberg in Germany for work. While there, in 1877 he became the editor of a Hebrew socialist monthly, which was followed by him being arrested three times. Finally, in 1879 he was expelled from the country, after which he emigrated to London, where he became a prominent Jewish socialist leader. While there he initially founded the Der Poylisher Yidl (The Little Polish Jew), one of the first Yiddish daily socialist newspapers. Then he helped to found the Arbeter Fraynd, the first Yiddish-language anarchist newspaper, which was run by the Worker's Friend Group. In 1885 Winchevsky married Rebecca Harris, with whom he had a son and a daughter. In 1894 he emigrated to New York City where he was involved in many literary activities. In 1927 he became paralyzed and suffered poor health until he eventually died there five years later.

== Early life ==
Winchevsky grew up in Lithuania, after which in 1873 he moved to Oriol, in Russia, where he became interested in ideologies of a revolutionary nature. After having returned to Kovne, Winchevsky then moved to Königsberg in Germany. While there, in 1877 he became the editor of a Hebrew socialist monthly. In the following year he was arrested for the first time for his socialist activities, which was followed by two further arrests. However, while doing so he found time to publish an eighteen-part article in Hakol (1878) in which he explained 'the German constitution and German social democracy'. Finally Winchevsky was expelled from the country, after which in 1879 he emigrated to London.

== Life in London ==
Five years later in London, Winchevsky started to edit Der poylisher idl (The Little Polish Man) and set up Arbeter Fraynd (The Worker's Friend), London's first Jewish newspaper which 'was printed in Yiddish, the language of immigrants, a language of heated political argument through which Jewish socialists hoped to organise Jewish workers.' Kops (1990) commented:

'The yeast of socialism started to ferment and soon tailors, boot makers, and all the other struggling impoverished artisans and craftsmen believed that the answer was in their own hands. Trade unions were set up and the seed bed for political agitation flourished. The British authorities started to get worried. These revolutionary Jews from eastern Europe might well fire the seething British working classes into action.

Two accounts have been published about what happened next. Kops (1990) observed 'Into this hotbed stepped Rudolf Rocker a German non-Jew. This charismatic figure took over the Arbeter Fraynd, and started to spread his message of anarchism.' In contrast, Norwood and Pollack (2008) observed 'In 1891, when Der arbeter fraynd became anarchist, [Winchevsky] withdrew from the editorial board ....' Afterwards Winchevsky founded Di fraye velt (The Free World) a short-lived monthly publication, followed by Der veker (The Worker), while having his work published in English journals.

== Life in New York City ==
Leadership of the Jewish Socialist Federation in 1917. Seated: Ben-Tsien Hofman (Tsivion), Max Goldfarb, Morris Winchevsky, A. Litvak, Hannah Salutsky, and Moishe Terman. Standing (L-R): Shauchno Epstein, Frank Rozenblat, Baruch Charney Vladeck, Moissaye Olgin, Jacob Salutsky (J.B.S. Hardman).

In 1884 Winchevsky emigrated to New York City in the United States. While there he joined with Abraham Cahan and Louis Miller, two other prominent New York Jewish socialists, to found what would later become the largest Yiddish-language daily newspaper in the world, The Forward in 1897. This got them kicked out of the Socialist Labor Party. They would later migrate to the Social Democracy of America, the Social Democratic Party of America and the Socialist Party of America. Winchevsky wrote parodies directed to Jews of the Pale of Settlement in hopes of creating class consciousness.

Winchevsky was later selected as the representative of the Jewish Socialist Federation to the American Jewish Congress when the AJC met to select its delegates to the Paris Peace Conference in 1919. At the meeting of the Congress, Winchevsky was publicly censured by the JSF for expressing Zionist sentiments. He was subsequently associated with the Communist Party USA and its Yiddish daily Morgen Freiheit.

Winchevsky died on March 18, 1932, and is buried in the Workmen's Circle section of Mount Carmel Cemetery in Queens, alongside other Jewish socialist leaders.

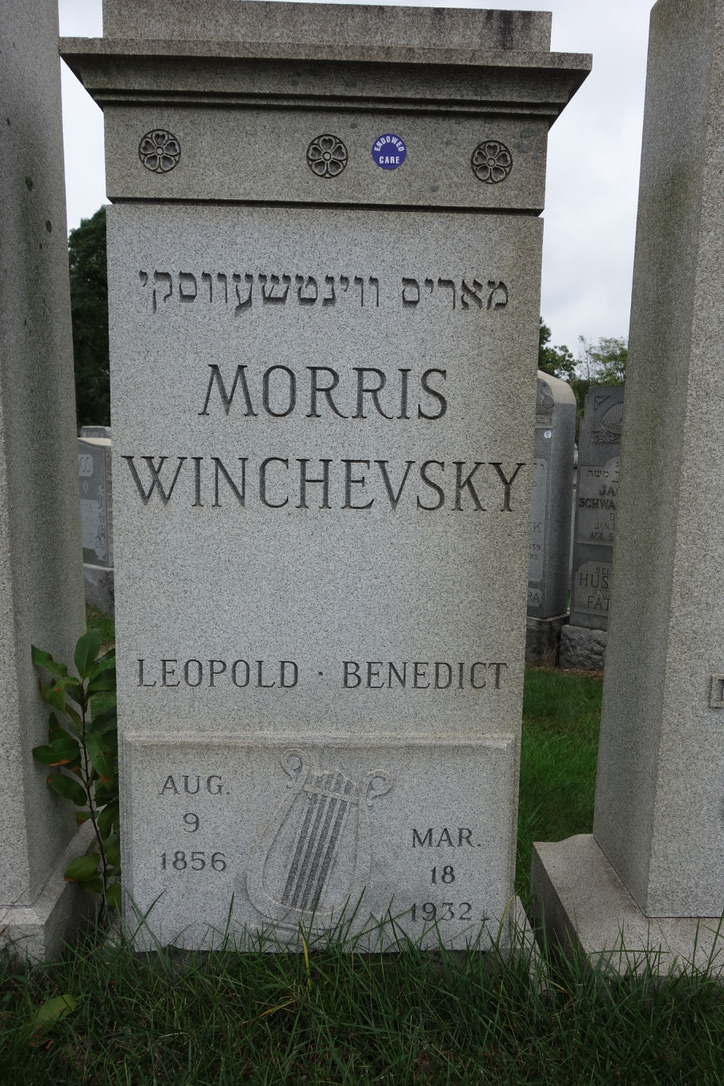
Morris Winchevsky grave stone in Mount Carmel Cemetery, Queens

== Poetry ==
Winchevsky is known for his role in the development of Yiddish poetry. Notably, he was a member of the Sweatshop Poets, an association formed with Morris Rosenfeld, David Edelstadt, and Joseph Bovshover.

== Tributes ==
A "secular humanist" Jewish Sunday school in Toronto, Ontario, was named after Winchevsky. Founded in 1928, the Morris Winchevsky School is run by the United Jewish People's Order.
