= The Moscow News =

Russian newspaper

Cover of a 1979 Soviet issue of the Moscow News

The Moscow News, which began publication in 1930, was Russia's oldest English-language newspaper. Many of its feature articles used to be translated from the Russian language Moskovskiye Novosti.

== History ==
=== Soviet Union ===
In 1930 The Moscow News was founded by American socialist Anna Louise Strong, who was one of the leaders of the Seattle General Strike in 1919. It was approved by the Communist leadership—at that time already dominated by Joseph Stalin—in 1930 as an international newspaper with the purpose of spreading the ideas of socialism to international audience. The paper was soon published in many languages, including major world languages, such as French, German, Spanish, Italian, Greek, Hungarian, and Arabic, as well as languages of neighboring countries, such as Finnish.

The first head of the foreign department of the Moscow News was British communist Rose Cohen. She was arrested in Moscow in August 1937, and shot on November 28, 1937 (she was rehabilitated in the USSR in 1956). In 1949, the Moscow News was shut down after its editor-in-chief, Mikhail Borodin, was arrested (and most likely died in a prison camp (Gulag).

The paper resumed publication under the supervision of the Communist Party on January 4, 1956.

In 1985, during the tenure of Gennadi Gerasimov as editor-in-chief, he hired Bob Meyerson as an editor stylist (a re-write editor). At that point Meyerson (who had spent a year at the Moscow State University as a graduate student and also a year at the Pushkin Russian Language Institute, and was the only American pacifist living full-time in the Soviet Union) became the only American working for any Soviet newspaper during the next three years. In addition to his daily editing duties, Meyerson managed to write about a dozen articles featuring courageous American tourists who had come to the USSR as bridges for peace. Simultaneously, those articles promoted freedom of speech in the USSR by highlighting the efforts of rare topics such as citizen diplomacy, civil disobedience, and the dangers of nuclear energy, the dangers of nuclear war, and the work of some US diplomats in Moscow who intentionally or unintentionally were perpetuating the Cold War and the nuclear arms race.

Thanks to some key help from several of his co-workers, and the support of Gerasimov and several American sponsors, in 1988 Meyerson was able to found the first branch of Toastmasters International ever in a communist country, which marked the first time that courses in public speaking were allowed at the Moscow State University, which was Mikhail Gorbachev's alma mater.

At Gerasimov's request, in early 1989, Meyerson founded a second Toastmasters club in Moscow, this time at Gerasimov's alma mater, the Moscow State Institute of International Relations (MGIMO). A third club for working professionals was founded later that year, with Meyerson suggesting a name that would encourage the members not to be afraid to speak out. That club was "The Moscow Free Speakers," and remarkably, it was still functioning in 2016.

When Gennad Gerasimov left The Moscow News in 1986 to become the official press spokesman for Gorbachev, he was replaced by Yegor Yakovlev. In 1988 Gorbachev met English publisher Robert Maxwell and asked for his help in updating the newspaper. A small team of top Daily Mirror executive journalists was set up in Pushkin square and worked with Yakovlev creating a redesign and waiting for news of the Soviet withdrawal from Afghanistan in order to relaunch the newspaper with the headline “Coming home!” The newspaper began to break one taboo after another during the era of Gorbachev's reforms known as glasnost (openness) and perestroika (rebuilding)[2] and sales soared, often selling out within 15 minutes of publication. When Revel Barker, Mirror managing editor, addressed the Moscow News journalists on the concept of a free press, they accused him of “bringing about the downfall of the Soviet Socialist system”. During that time some communists were so infuriated at the paper's shocking revelations and criticism that they started referring to The Moscow News as "yellow press."

Around 1989 there was a suspicious late night fire in a prestigious restaurant on the ground floor of the same building housing The Moscow News headquarters. There was one fatality as someone slipped from an ice-covered second floor window. Due to considerable water and structural damage to the English-language section of the paper, the staff had to relocate several blocks away to a much newer building on Kalininsky Prospekt. About a year later, after the former fire-damaged building had been renovated, the staff moved back to Pushkin Square.

In 1992, shortly after the collapse of the Soviet Union, Meyerson left The Moscow News, but stayed in Russia for two more years. Alexander Vainshtein became chief editor of the newspaper. In 2003 The Moscow News was sold to the Yukos-funded Open Russia Foundation.

In 2004, the Moscow News began to introduce a fully colored front-page.

=== Russian Federation ===
Perhaps in the mid-1990s, Sergey Roy became the editor-in-chief.

Under President Vladimir Putin, and suffering from declining sales, Moscow News was bought by Mikhail Khodorkovsky, one of Russia's oligarchs and owner of Yukos. Khodorkovsky hired Yevgeny Kiselyov, an outspoken liberal journalist who started a scandal in the ranks by firing nine veteran journalists. Kiselyov was eventually replaced by Arkady Gaidamak, an Israeli businessman, who became owner of the newspaper in October 2005.

The Moscow News has had numerous other owners: Ogonyok, International Book, and the All-Union Society of Cultural Ties with Foreign Countries among others have had a stake in the historic newspaper at one time or another. In 2007, the English version of The Moscow News was partially owned by the RIA Novosti news agency, with some of articles translated from Moskovskiye Novosti.

Between January and September 2007, the paper was managed by Anthony Louis, who introduced several changes. The paper's format was changed to a completely new layout with new fonts and masthead design. The paper went from 16 to 32 pages and featured a variety of popular columnists, both Russian and foreigners.

Local and business coverage was expanded, as well as a sport and local section that features regular original writing by staff writers, most of whom are expatriates living in Moscow. Distribution on domestic and international Aeroflot flights was reintroduced as well. The paper was available free of charge at many business establishments in the Russian capital, and was sold in kiosks at prominent locations, such as Pushkin Square. Between September 2007 and February 2009, the editor-in-chief was Robert Bridge.

=== Closure ===
In the summer of 2012, the paper started appearing less often, dropping being from a bi-weekly to being a weekly, and its news and politics sections took on a broader, more in-depth focus. It ran occasional advertisement, and was distributed mainly free of charge. It continued to cover both Russian and global news and columns by writers including Mark Galeotti. The paper was financed entirely by its owners. It ceased publication in 2014 and became a web-only news medium, although from two months later the web edition was no longer updated. The printed paper's last editor-in-chief was Natalia Antonova.

On January 23, 2014, the paper ceased appearing in print "by order of the management". On March 14, 2014, the paper "ceased updating materials on its news website, Facebook page and Twitter account due to the liquidation process and reorganization of its parent company, the Russian state news agency RIA Novosti". Both events followed President Vladimir Putin's December 9, 2013 abolition of the state-owned news agency, which would be merged in 2014 into a new news agency Rossiya Segodnya (Russia Today). Editor Natalia Antonova wrote in a March 14 farewell signed article: "If you write about Russia with any kind of nuance, you may confuse and anger many people. At first this will scare you, then it will infuriate you, then you'll get used to it."

The newspaper can be viewed in its entirety from 1930 – 2014 in a digital archive.

=== Editors-in-chief ===
- 1932–1949: Mikhail Borodin
- 1983–1986: Gennadi Gerasimov
- 1986–1991: Yegor Yakovlev
- 1991–1995: Len Karpinsky
- 1995–2003: Viktor Loshak
- 2003–2005: Yevgeny Kiselyov
- 2006–2007: Vitaly Tretyakov
