= Jacob Benjamin Salutsky =

Labor activist and journalist (1882–1968)

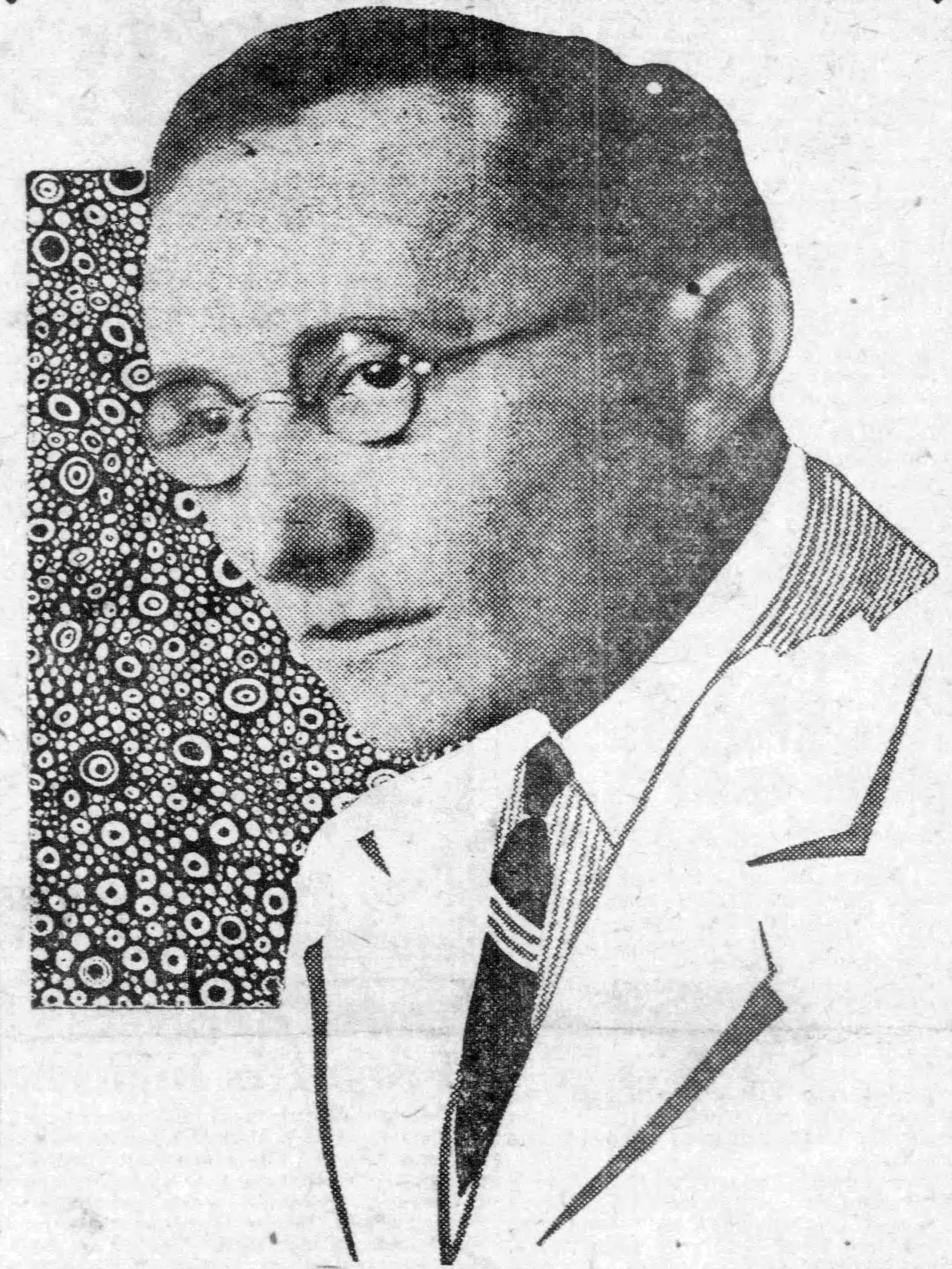
- Born: August 25, 1882; Grodno, Russian Empire
- Died: January 29, 1968 (aged 85); New York, New York, U.S.
- Other names: J. B. S. Hardman
- Occupations: Writer, editor, political activist, radical journalist, trade unionist
- Spouse(s): Hannah Goldstein; Virginia Mishnun

Jacob Benjamin Salutsky (August 25, 1882 – January 29, 1968), also known by the alias as J.B.S. Hardman, was a Belarusian-born Jewish American political activist, radical journalist and trade union functionary. Hardman was a proponent of radicalism as a Marxist thinker and a leader of the Jewish Socialist Federation of the Socialist Party of America (SPA). A brief stint in the American Communist movement ended in his expulsion in 1923.

For more than two decades thereafter, Hardman was Education Director of the Amalgamated Clothing Workers of America (ACWA).

== Early life ==
Salutsky was born on August 25, 1882 into a Russian Jewish family in Grodno, Belarus, then in the Russian Empire. His father was a lumber merchant.

Salutsky was politicized at a young age, embracing Marxism and joining the General Jewish Labor Bund in 1902. Salutsky dedicated himself to the antitsarist revolutionary work of the Bund and to labor organization over the subsequent several years, first heading a union of bank employees in Vilna before becoming the secretary of the central association of trade unions of Kiev.

Salutsky was a participant in the 1905 Russian Revolution as a party organizer in Vilna in 1906 and in Kiev in 1907. His activity drew the attention of the tsarist secret police and led to three stints in prison for his political activity. After the failure of the 1905 Revolution, Salutsky went into exile; he spent 1908 in Paris and left for America the following year.

== Arrival in America ==
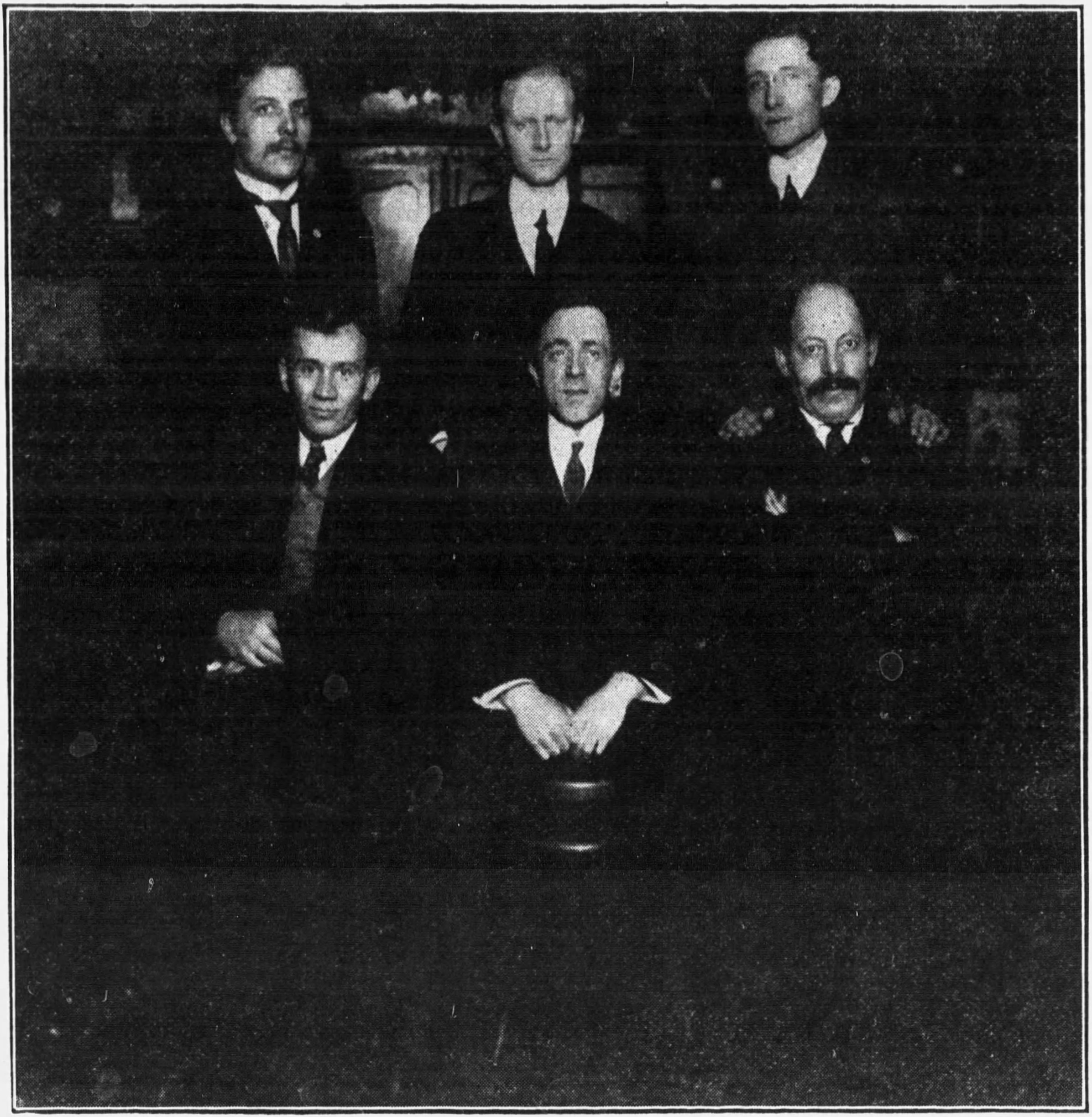
Salutsky (standing, right) among foreign translator-secretaries for the Socialist Party of America, 1912

Salutsky arrived in the United States of America in 1909, became an active member of the Socialist Party and the trade union movement, and was elected in the summer of 1912 as the secretary of the Jewish Socialist Federation (JSF), the Yiddish affiliate of the Socialist Party. For a time, he served as translator-secretary of the JFS and editor of the Federation's weekly, Di Naye Welt ("The New World"), from 1914 to 1920.

As editor of Di Naye Welt, Salutsky strove to make it as an outlet through which his audience of Jewish immigrants could be familiarized with the mainstream American culture of the time. The newspaper included translations of works by American and European authors as well as poetry and theater reviews. The newspaper essentially worked towards "the Americanization of its members without adversely affecting their Jewish identity." Di Naye Welt also published biting criticism against the extreme radicalism of the underground Communist Party of America: "the further they go, the more one can define them as a tendency of humbug, bluff, and demagogy."

Leadership of the Jewish Socialist Federation in 1917. Seated (L-R): Ben-Tsien Hofman (Tsivion), Max Goldfarb, Morris Winchevsky, A. Litvak, Hannah Salutsky, Moishe Terman. Standing: Shauchno Epstein, Frank Rozenblat, Baruch Charney Vladeck, Moissaye Olgin, Jacob Salutsky (J.B.S. Hardman).

Despite his criticism of the delusions and excesses of the underground Communist Party, Salutsky found himself in general agreement with its radical critique of the tepid moderation of the Socialist Party and sought to join an open and realistic Communist Party. A member of the Socialist Party of America until 1921, Salutsky was a leading member of a left-wing faction, The Committee for a Third International, which attempted to affiliate the party with the Communist International in 1920.

Following the defeat of those efforts, Salutsky broke with the party in 1921 and helped to organize the Workers Council, a Marxist organization that pushed for an end to the dysfunctional factionalism of the underground Communist Party and the establishment of a new, open, and "legal" organization. That came to fruition in the last days of 1921 with the establishment of the Workers Party of America (WPA); the Workers Council joined that new legal arm of the underground CPA en bloc, with Salutsky becoming a member of the governing Central Executive Committee of the group.

Salutsky remained critical of the underground Communists, who continued to exist in parallel with the legal WPA, believing them "intent on building a new vehicle to carry the old Communist war." His disaffection growing, Salutsky began to turn his attention to the organized labor movement and became in 1923 the editor of the American Labor Monthly, a socialist-oriented labor magazine. The same year saw his expulsion from the Workers Party for refusing to intervene on its behalf at the Conference for Progressive Political Action in Cleveland in 1922 and for refusing to submit the American Labor Monthly to party control.

== Trade union activity ==
In 1924, he adopted a new surname, Hardman, and he was known as J.B.S. Hardman from then on.

In the Amalgamated Clothing Workers of America, he served as director of education and cultural activities for 24 years as well as editor of the union's official publication, The Advance, from 1925 to 1944.

His deep interest in the educational betterment of workers was reflected by his appointment to the Executive Committee of the Workers' Education Bureau of America, founded in 1921 by trade union progressives and educators. The ACWA emphasized the value of education for its growing number of workers. Likewise, Hardman regarded higher education of workers as a necessary element of the worries of the union: "when the body of the worker is more rested and better fed, his intellect should likewise be taken are of."

From 1929 to 1933, Hardman served as a member of the executive committee of the Conference for Progressive Labor Action (CPLA), a radical labor organization that was associated with A. J. Muste and Brookwood Labor College. Hardman was bitterly opposed the CPLA's joining with the Trotskyist Communist League of America to form a new organization, the American Workers Party, in 1934 and quit that organization soon after it was launched. Hardman then came into the orbit of the liberal wing of the Democratic Party over the next few years and supported US President Franklin Roosevelt by 1936.

In World War II, Hardman helped to organize the American Labor Press Association and served as its president.

From 1945 to 1953, he founded and edited the periodical Labor and Nation. The publication aspired to "bring labor leaders and intellectuals together to create a more educated and nationally aware labor leadership" and to "foster a group of dedicated intellectuals in the service of labor."

He also served as chairman of the Inter-Union Institute, an inclusive forum for men of various noncommunist leftists to discuss the labor movement.

== Later life ==
In the 1950s, he was the director of research of the Columbia University project "Trends in Union Leadership."

Hardman's first wife Hannah Goldstein died in 1955. He married writer Virginia Mishnun in 1964. He died at his home in Manhattan on January 29, 1968, at the age of 85.

== Sources ==
- Report of the Jewish Translator-Secretary. n.c. (Chicago): n.p. (Socialist Party of America), n.d. (1913). —Leaflet.
- Yudzshin Ṿiḳṭor Debs" zayn leben, shrifṭen un redes. (Editor and trans.) New York: Aroysgegeben far'n Debs Ferṭaydigung Fond in Ferlag "Naye Ṿelṭ", n.d. (1919). —by Eugene V. Debs.
- Hisṭorishe shrifṭen. (Editor and trans.) New York: Ḳarl Marḳs liṭeraṭur gezelshafṭ, 1919. —by Karl Marx.
- Sotsyalizm un ḳunsṭ: oysgeṿehlṭe shrifṭen. (Editor and trans.) New York: Aroysgegeben fun der Marḳs liṭeraṭur gezelshafṭ in farlag "Naye ṿelṭ", 1920. —by Anatolii Lunacharskii.
- Der ḳomunisṭisher manifesṭ. (Translator.) New York: Idisher sotsyalisṭisher federatsye in Ameriḳa, 1920. —by Karl Marx and Frederick Engels.
- Sotsyale reform oder reṿolutsye: oysgeṿehlṭe shrifṭen. (Editor and trans.) New York: Marḳs Liṭeraṭur Gezelshafṭ in Farlag "Naye Ṿelṭ," 1921. —by Rosa Luxemburg and Klara Zetkin.
- Di ṭeorye un praḳṭiḳ fun der sotsyaler reṿoltsuye [sic]. (Translator.) New York: Marḳs liṭeraṭur gezelshafṭ : Farlag "Naye ṿelṭ", 1921. —by V.I. Lenin.
- American Labor Dynamics in the Light of Post-War Developments: An Inquiry by Thirty-two Labor Men, Teachers, Editors, and Technicians. (Editor.) New York: Harcourt-Brace, 1928.
- Why Unions Go Smash! : Certain Dangerous Trends in American Trade Unionism and What is To Be Done. With James Oneal. New York: National Executive Committee of the Conference for Progressive Labor Action, 1930.
- The Amalgamated Today and Tomorrow: The Accomplishments, the Policies and the Aims of the Organized Clothing Workers of the Nation. New York: Amalgamated Clothing Workers of America, 1939.
- The Clothing Workers in Philadelphia: History of Their Struggles for Union and Security. With Elden LaMar. Philadelphia: Philadelphia Joint Board, Amalgamated Clothing Workers of America, 1940.
- The Book of the Amalgamated in New York, 1914-1940. New York: Amalgamated Clothing Workers of America, New York Joint Board, 1940.
- Rendezvous with Destiny: Addresses and Opinions of Franklin Delano Roosevelt. (Editor.) New York: Dryden Press, 1944.
- Sidney Hillman, Labor Statesman: A Story in Pictures and Text of the Man and the Amalgamated. With Leo Giovannitti. New York: Amalgamated Clothing Workers of America, 1948.
- The House of Labor: International Operations of American Unions. With Maurice F. Neufeld. New York: Prentice-Hall, 1951.
- How the Politburo Thinks and Letter to a Confused Liberal. With Leo Rosten. New York: Educational Dept., International Ladies' Garment Workers Union, n.d. (1951).
- "The Needle-Trades Unions: A Labor Movement at Fifty," Social Research, vol. 27, no. 3 (Autumn 1960), pp. 321–358. In JSTOR
- Fiftieth Anniversary Souvenir History of the New York Joint Board: Amalgamated Clothing Workers of America, AFL-CIO. New York: Amalgamated Clothing Workers of America, New York Joint Board, 1964
