= Moissaye Joseph Olgin =

American Yiddish newspaper editor (1878–1939)

- משה יוסף אָלגין
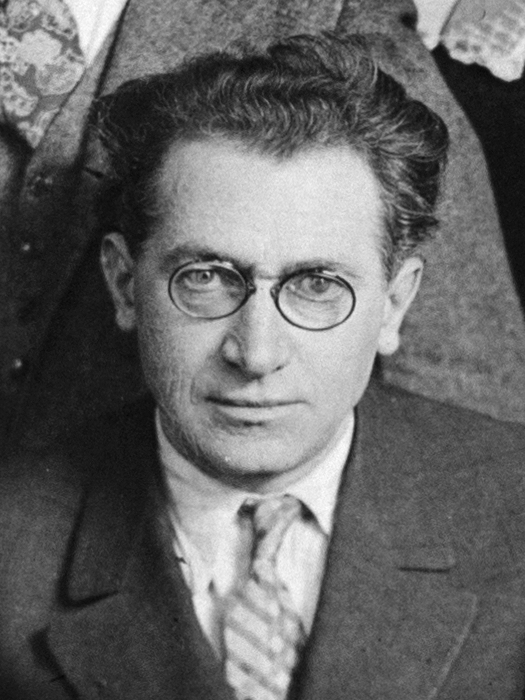
- Olgin c. 1922–1923
- Born: Moissaye Joseph Novominsky; March 24, 1878; Buki, Kiev Governorate, Russian Empire
- Died: November 22, 1939 (aged 61); New York City, U.S.
- Resting place: New Montefiore Cemetery
- Education: University of Kiev; University of Heidelberg; Columbia University
- Occupations: Writer; Journalist; Translator
- Years active: 1910–1939
- Political party: Socialist (before 1921); Communist (after 1921)
- Other political affiliations: Bund (1900s); Workers (1921–1929)

Moissaye Joseph Olgin (Yiddish: משה יוסף אָלגין; March 24, 1878 – November 22, 1939) was a Russian-born Jewish American writer, journalist, and translator in the early 20th century. He began his career writing for the Jewish press in support of the Russian Revolution. During the First World War, he moved to the United States and settled in New York City, where he continued his career in journalism. Much of his work was in support of communism, and he was a founding member of the Workers Party. In 1922, he founded The Morning Freiheit, and served as its editor until his death in 1939.

== Early life ==
Moissaye Joseph Olgin was born on March 24, 1878, in Buki, Kiev Governorate in the Russian Empire (present-day Ukraine), to Chaim Aaron Novominsky and Tsipe (Gelman) Novominsky, both of whom were of ethnic Jewish origins. His father worked as a lumber camp employee.

Olgin received a traditional education in Hebrew. After a short period of self-study, he began his studies at the University of Kiev in 1900.

He was sympathetic to the causes of the Russian Revolution, and first became active in the underground revolutionary movement during his studies at the University of Kiev. His writings for Jewish and revolutionary publications earned him some fame among the many Russian Jews, who were heavily oppressed by the government of Tsar Nicholas II. He took part in a Jewish revolutionary student group known as "Freiheit" (Freedom).

In 1901 Olgin was elected chairman of the Students Central Committee. The tsarist regime ordered his arrest in April 1903 on a charge of organizing Jewish self-defense groups against anticipated pogroms.

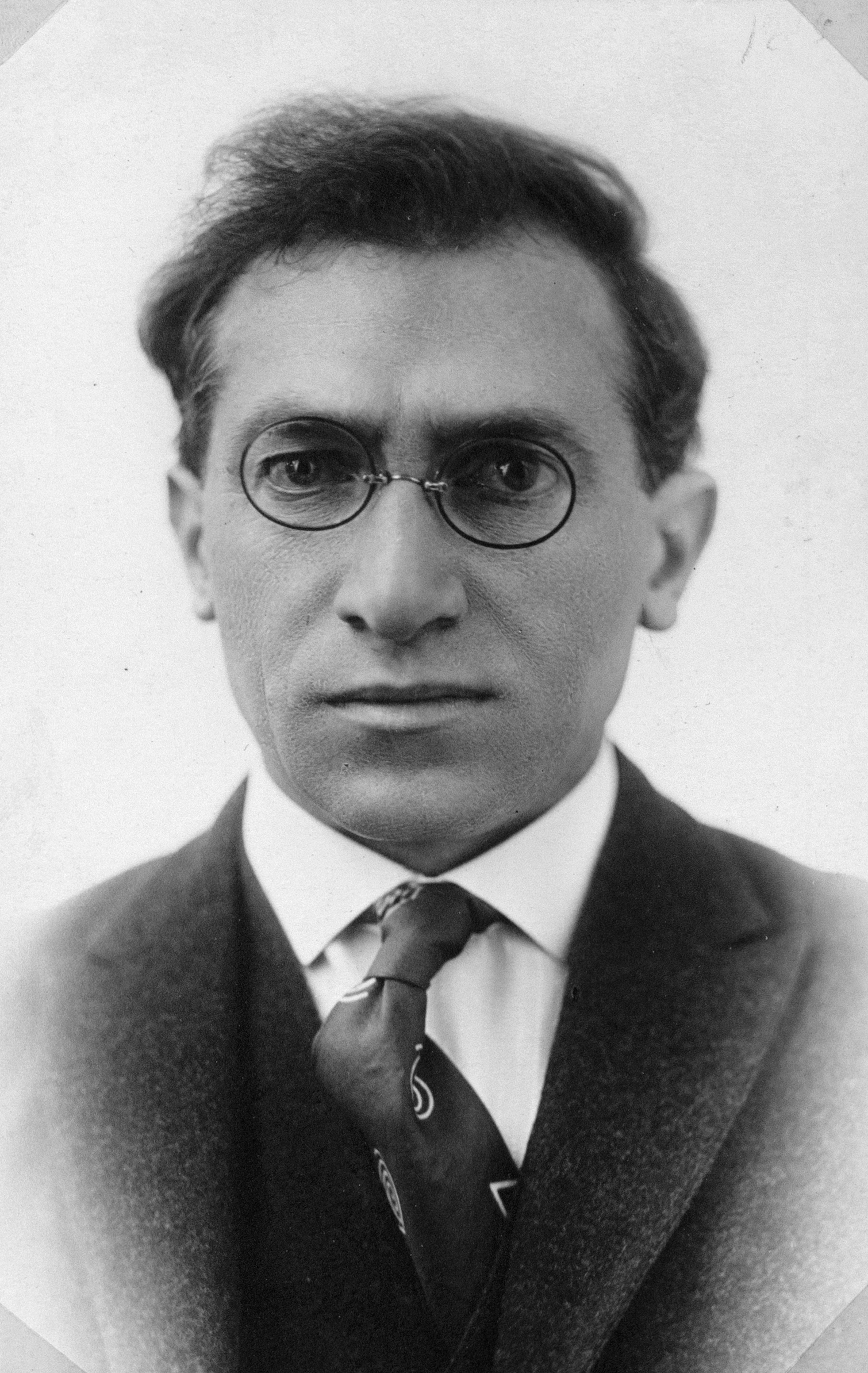
Olgin in Vilno c. 1904–1907

In 1904, Olgin left the University of Kiev and went to Vilno as a member of the Vilno Committee of the General Jewish Labour Bund. There he was arrested but released on bail. He then became a member of the editorial board of the Arbeiter Stimme (Labor's Voice). He was the author of all the proclamations issued by the Central Committee of the Bund during the Revolution of 1905 while at the same time he prepared literary compositions for the illegal Jewish press. While editing newspapers and working with these underground organizations he also wrote books, short stories and literary essays.

In 1907, he traveled to Germany to continue his studies at the University of Heidelberg. He continued his studies there until 1910, when he returned to Russia.

Traveling in Germany at the onset of World War I, he was unable to return to Russia, and immigrated to the United States in 1915.

== Career ==
Leadership of the Jewish Socialist Federation in 1917. Seated (L-R): Ben-Tsien Hofman (Tsivion), Max Goldfarb, Morris Winchevsky, A. Litvak, Hannah Salutsky, Moishe Terman. Standing: Shauchno Epstein, Frank Rozenblat, Baruch Charney Vladeck, Moissaye Olgin, Jacob Salutsky (J.B.S. Hardman).

Shortly after arriving in the United States, Olgin became a regular contributor to the Jewish daily newspaper The Forward.

Olgin became an American citizen in April 1920. He was a leading member of the Jewish Socialist Federation of the Socialist Party of America and was influential in leading the JSF out of the party at a special convention of the organization held in September 1921. Together with other defecting members of the JSF, Olgin thereafter entered the fledgling Workers Council organization, a small group of revolutionary socialists which rejected the conspiratorial "underground" form of organization of the then extant communist movement. Olgin ceased contributing to The Forward at this same time.

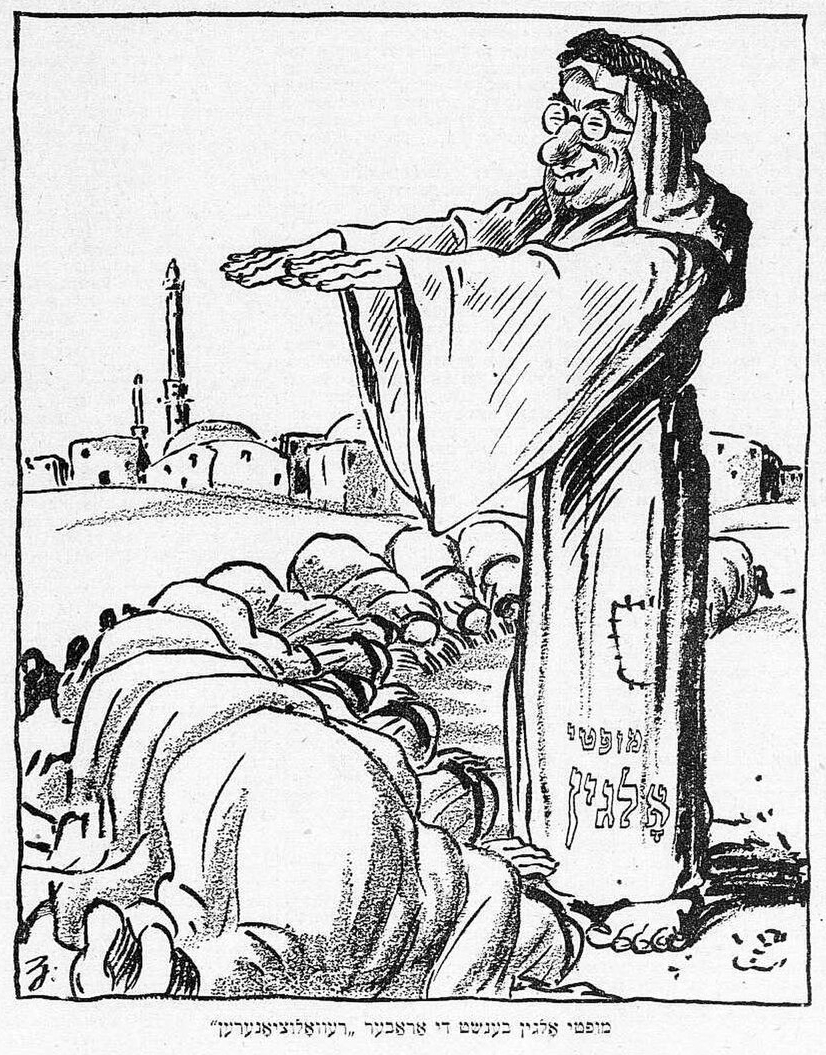
"Mufti Olgin blesses the Arab revolutionaries," a political cartoon published in The Jewish Daily Forward satirizing Olgin's alleged support for the 1929 Palestine riots, October 13, 1929

In April 1922, there was launched a new Yiddish-language newspaper, the Daily Freiheit (later the Morning Freiheit). Olgin served as first editor of this publication, a position which he retained up until the time of his death. He also contributed frequently to the Communist Party's English-language newspaper, The Daily Worker, and served as a special correspondent for the Soviet Communist Party's daily, Pravda.

At the end of December 1922, the Workers Council group was among the organizations which were united into the Workers Party of America (WPA), a new "legal political party" affiliated with the underground Communist Party of America, and Olgin thereby entered the formal communist movement for the first time. Olgin was named to the governing Bureau of the Jewish Federation of this new organization. Olgin was a member of the governing Central Executive Committee of the WPA and its Executive Council from the time of the organization's formation.

Olgin was a frequent candidate for political office on behalf of the Communist Party in the Bronx. He first ran in 1924, when he was a candidate for New York State Senate on the Workers Party ticket. He then ran for Congress in 1926, 1930, 1932 and 1934, and for New York State Assembly in 1925, 1927, 1929, 1933, and twice in 1936. His best showing was in the first 1936 Assembly race, a January special election where he came in second place with 15% of the vote.

Although a bitter rival of Alexander Bittelman in the heated factional politics of the Jewish Federation in the early 1920s, by the middle of the decade, Olgin had emerged as a supporter of the political faction that was headed by William Z. Foster, Earl Browder, and his former foe.

Olgin made several trips to the Soviet Union. In 1937, he went to Paris as delegation to the International Yiddish Culture Congress which founded the World Alliance for Jewish Culture (YCUF). While in Paris, he addressed the Writers Congress.

== Death and legacy ==
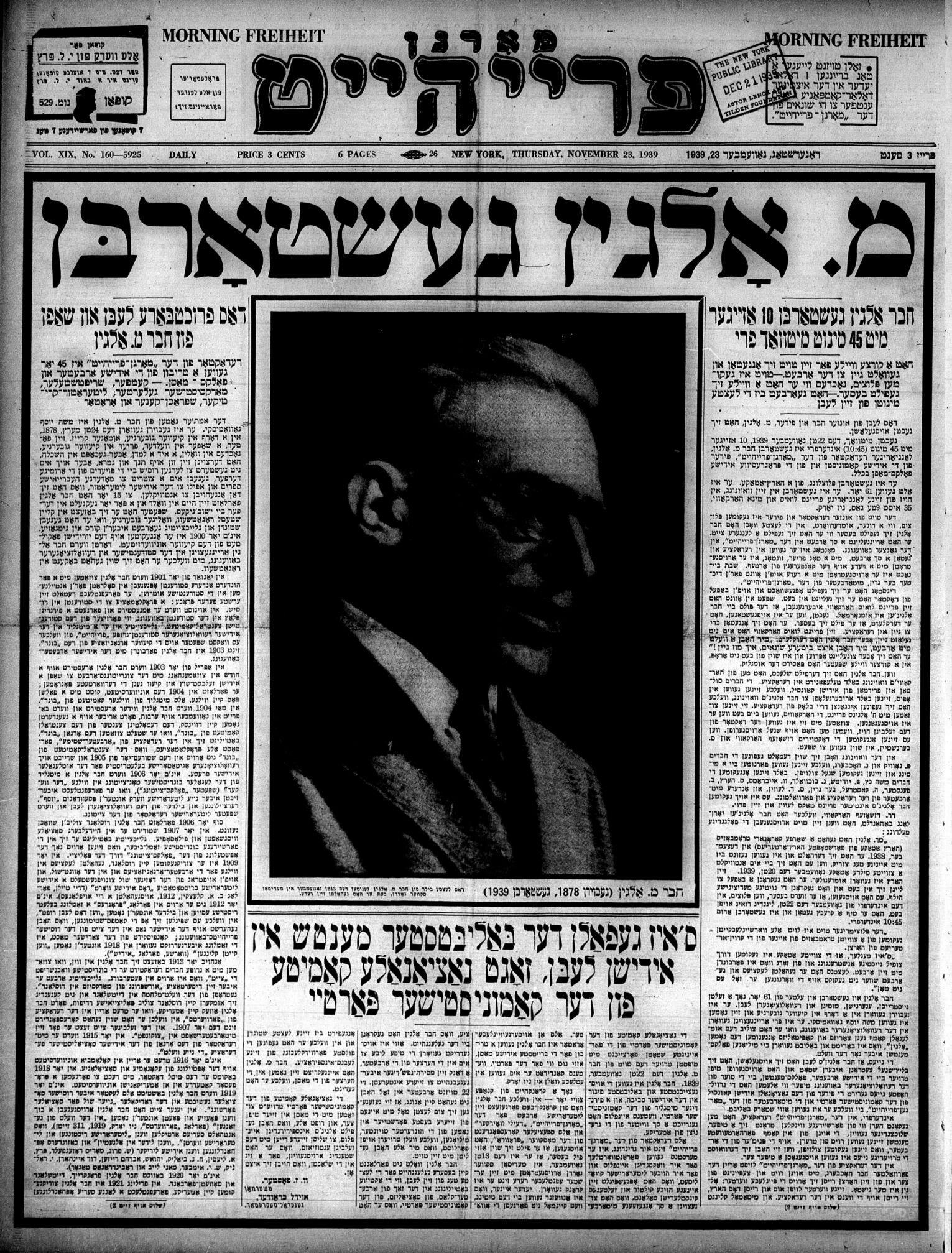
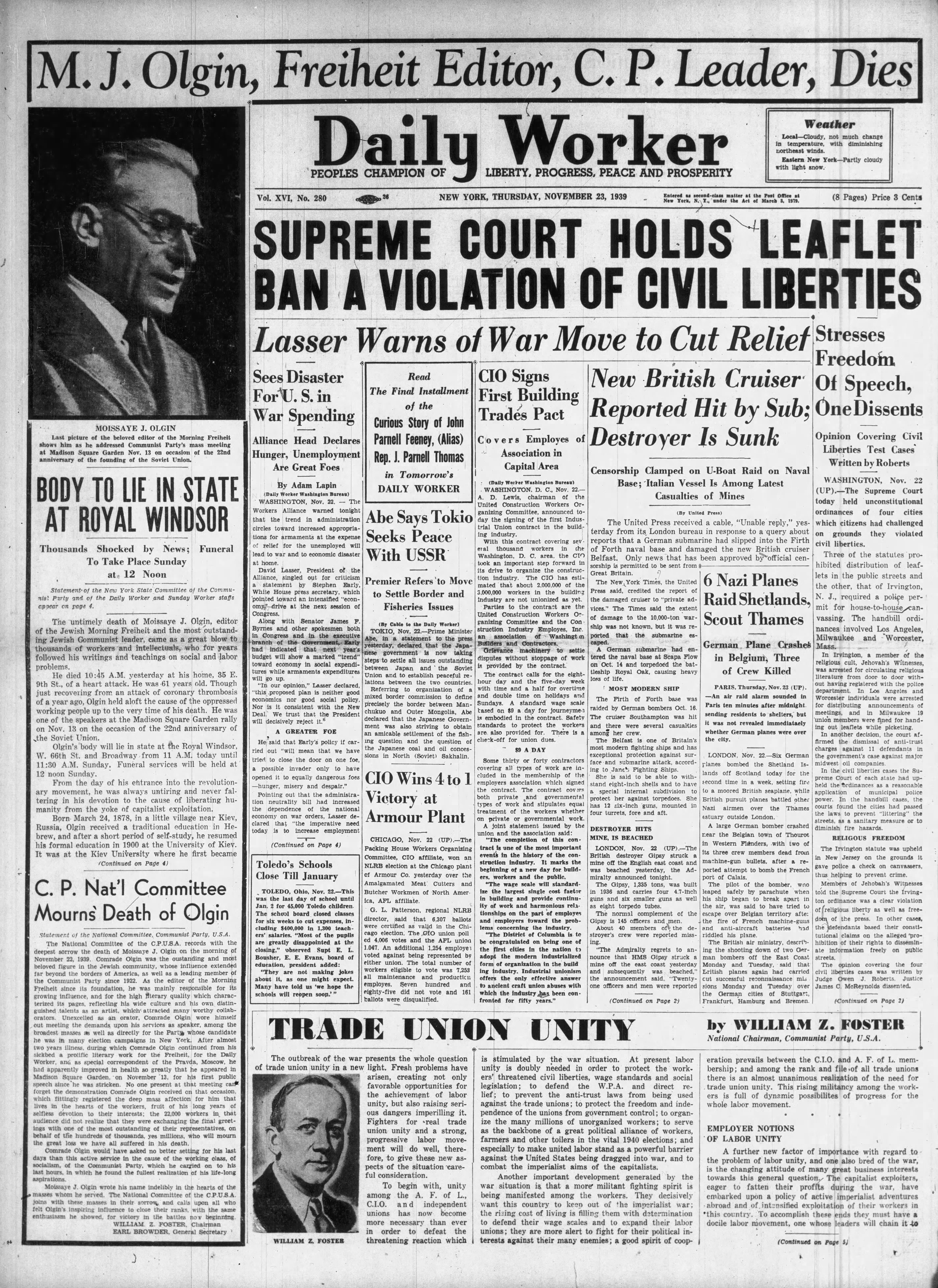
The front pages of the Morgen Freiheit (left) and Daily Worker the day after Olgin's death, November 23, 1939

Following his trip to Paris, Olgin's health began to decline. After almost two years' illness, during which Olgin continued his work for the Freiheit, as well as for the Daily Worker and as the American correspondent for Pravda, he had apparently improved in health enough to appear at Madison Square Garden, on November 13, for his first public speech in several years. Following the speech, his health again declined, and he died at his home of a heart attack on November 22, 1939. He was buried in New Montefiore Cemetery near Farmingdale, New York. Paul Novick succeeded him as editor-in-chief of the Freiheit, a position he held until the paper ceased publication in 1988.

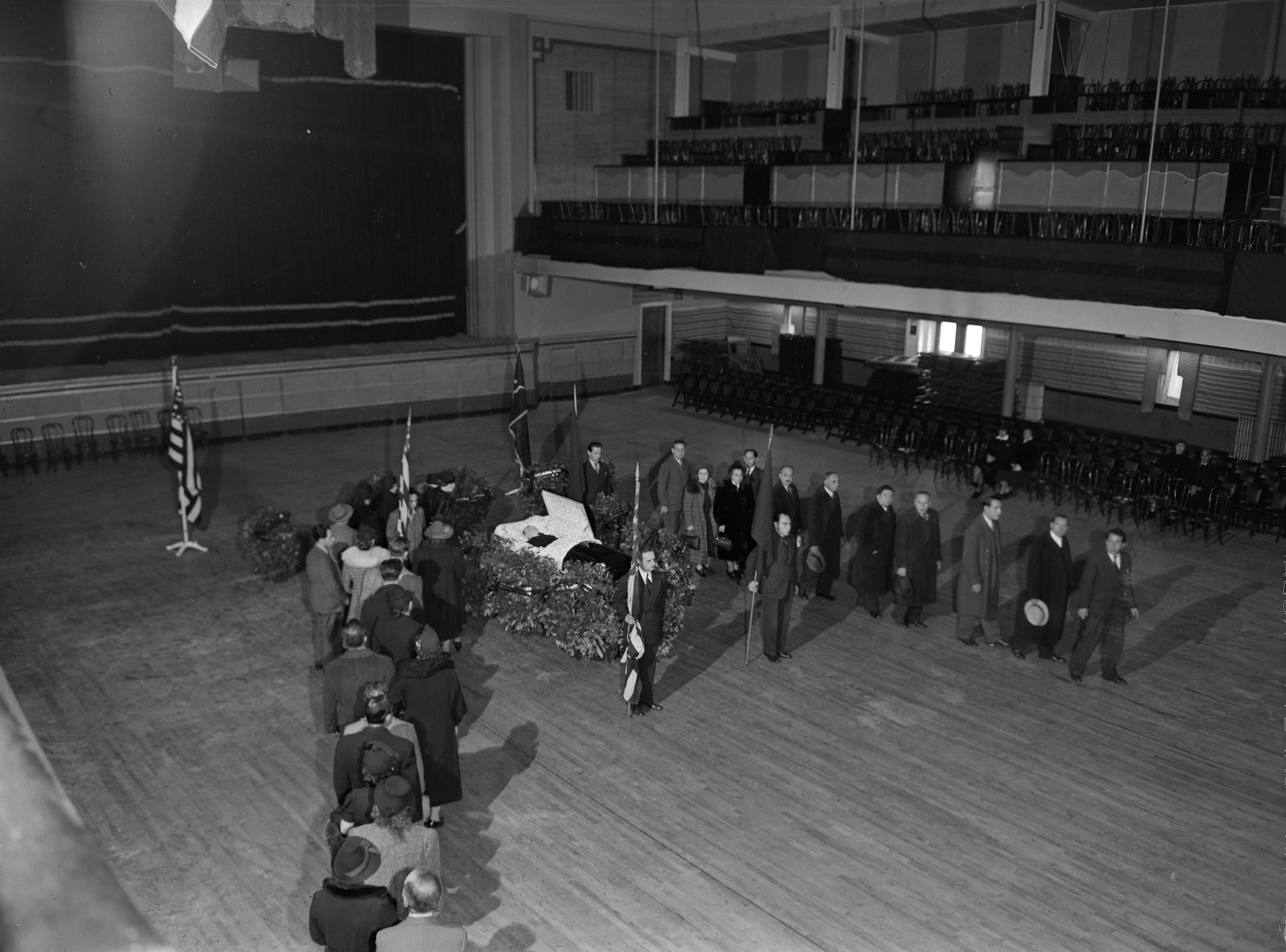
Olgin's body lies in state at the Windsor Hotel in New York City, November 23, 1939

Olgin was the author of numerous books and pamphlets in seven languages: English, Russian, German, French, Polish, Hebrew and Yiddish. It is not known whether some of these works were, in fact, translated by others. He wrote verse, essays, literary criticism and sociological studies. His books The Soul of the Russian Revolution and A Guide to Russian Literature and pamphlet Why Communism? achieved sales of nearly half a million in several languages.

Olgin translated several volumes of Lenin's collected works from Russian into English; Friedrich Engels' The Peasant War in Germany from German into Yiddish; John Reed's Ten Days That Shook the World from English into Yiddish; a volume of short stories from Polish into Yiddish; two volumes of tales of Mendele Mocher Sforim, the father of Jewish literature, from Hebrew into Yiddish; and Jack London's Call of the Wild from English into Yiddish.

== Selected works ==
- The Soul of the Russian Revolution. New York: Henry Holt, 1917.
- A Guide to Russian Literature (1820–1917). New York: Harcourt, Brace and Howe, 1920.
- The Socialist Party, Last Bulwark of Capitalism. New York: Workers Library Publishers, 1932.
- Capitalism Defends Itself through the Socialist Labor Party. New York: Workers Library Publishers, 1932.
- Why Communism? Plain Talks on Vital Problems. New York: Workers Library Publishers, 1933.
- Maxim Gorky: Writer and Revolutionist. New York: International Publishers, 1933.
- The Way Out: A Program for American Labor. New York: Workers Library Publishers, 1934.
- Trotskyism: Counter-Revolution in Disguise. New York: Workers Library Publishers, 1935.
- Life and Teachings of Friedrich Engels. New York: Workers Library Publishers, 1935.
- Lenin and the Bolsheviki. New York: Revolutionary Workers League, 1936. — Reprinted from Asia, vol. 17, no. 10 (December 1917).
- That Man Browder: Communist Candidate for President. New York: Workers Library Publishers, 1936.
