= Zivion =

Yiddish writer, journalist, and activist

Benzion Hoffman
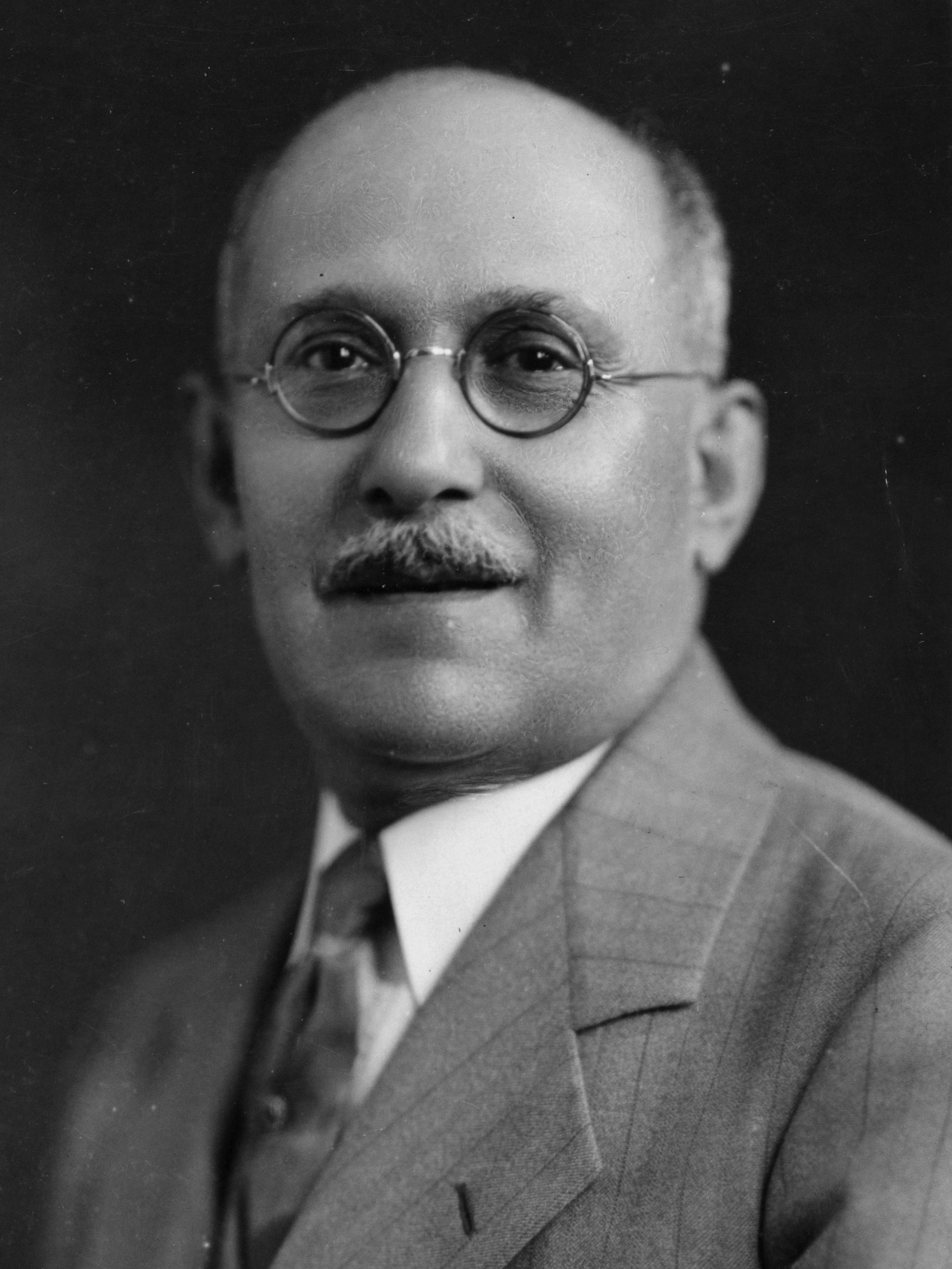
- Born: 1 May 1874; Krug, Courland, Russian Empire
- Died: 14 October 1954 (aged 80); New York, United States
- Resting place: Mount Carmel Cemetery, Queens, New York
- Writing career
- Pen name: Zivion, Tz., Ish Tikva, Afna, Rozman
- Language: Yiddish, Hebrew

Benzion Hoffman (Yiddish: בּנציון האָפֿמאַן, romanized: Bentsiyen Hofman; 1 May 1874 – 14 October 1954), best known by the pen name Zivion (צבֿיון, Tsivyen), was a Yiddish writer, journalist, and political activist.

== Biography ==
Leadership of the Jewish Socialist Federation in 1917. Seated (L-R): Ben-Tsien Hofman (Tsivion), Max Goldfarb, Morris Winchevsky, A. Litvak, Hannah Salutsky, Moishe Terman. Standing: Shauchno Epstein, Frank Rozenblat, Baruch Charney Vladeck, Moissaye Olgin, Jacob Salutsky (J.B.S. Hardman).

Hoffman was born in the village of Krug, near Boysk, in the Courland Governorate. He studied at various yeshivas in the region, meanwhile becoming acquainted with Maskilic literature, before moving to Vilna at the age of sixteen. There, he was ordained as a rabbi by av beis din Rabbi Shlomo ha-Kohen. He later studied at the Universities of Karlsruhe, Heidelberg, Berlin, and Bern, and obtained a doctorate in engineering.

Hoffman published under the pseudonyms Zivion (צבֿיון, a near-anagram of בּנציון), Tz. (צ.), Ish Tikva (איש תקווה, 'Man of Hope'), Afna, and Rozman. His first articles appeared in Hebrew in Ha-Melitz in 1895; he would go on to contribute to Ha-Zman, Forverts, Di tsukunft, Der yidisher arbeyter, Folkstsaytung, and Fraynd, among other periodicals. The following year, he co-founded a socialist Zionist circle in Riga and joined the Bundist movement. He attended the Fifth Zionist Congress in 1901 as a correspondent for Forverts, and later took part in the 5th Congress of the Russian Social Democratic Labour Party.

He emigrated to New York in 1908, where he became a central figure in American Jewish journalism. In the years that followed, Hoffman edited and contributed to the Hebrew daily Ha-Yom, the Yiddish periodicals Der fraynd, Di naye post, Di tsukunft, Der tog, Di naye velt, and Gerekhtikeyt, and the Yiddish section of the English-Yiddish Encyclopedic Dictionary.

He died at his home in New York City on 14 October 1954.

== Selected bibliography ==
- Froyen-handel un prostitutsye [Trafficking of Women and Prostitution] (in Yiddish). Vilna: Di velt. 1906.
- "Yuhz, vilson un dos folk" [Hughes, Wilson, and the People]. Jewish Labor World (in Yiddish). VII (451). New York: 5. 27 October 1916.
- Astronomye [Astronomy]. 880-04Arbeyṭer Ring biblioṭeḳ; 12-14 (in Yiddish). New York: Aroysgegeben fun der Edyukeyshonal komite fun Arbeyter Ring. 1918. hdl:2027/mdp.39015052684985.
- Karl Marx: zayn leben, zayn ṿirḳen un zayne lehren, 1818–1918 [Karl Marx: His Works and His Teachings, 1818–1918] (in Yiddish). New York: Aroysgegeben fun di Fareynigte Idishe arbayter organizatsyonen. 1918.
- Dos leben fun khayes: zoologye [The Life of Animals: Zoology]. Cover title :Zoologie (in Yiddish). New York: Aroysgegeben fun der Natsyonaler Edyukeyshonal komite fun Arbeyter Ring. 1919. hdl:2027/mdp.39015051594565.
- Fuftsig yohr kloukmakher yunyon, 1886–1936 [Fifty Years of the Cloakmakers' Union, 1886–1936] (in Yiddish). New York: United Cloak, Suit, Infants and Children's Coats Operators Union, Local 117. 1936.
- Vos iz bolshevizm? [What is Bolshevism?] (in Yiddish). New York: Aroysgegeben fun der Yidisher sotsyalistishen federatsye. 1919.
- Di iberboyung fun der gezelshaft nokhn krig [Reconstruction of Society After the War] (in Yiddish). New York. 1919.
- Mayn rayze keyn Erets-Yisroel [My Voyage to the Land of Israel] (in Yiddish). Warsaw: Di velt. 1923.
- Komunistn vos hobn oyfgegesn dem komunizm [Communists Who Have Regretted Communism] (in Yiddish). New York. 1923.
- Toyznt yor Pinsk [1000 Years of Pinsk] (in Yiddish). New York. 1941.
- Kazdan, Khayim Shloyme, ed. (1948). Far fuftsik yor: geklibene shriftn [For Fifty Years: Selected Writings] (in Yiddish). New York: Elias Laub Publishing Co.
