= Shakne Epshtein =

Soviet journalist (1883–1945)

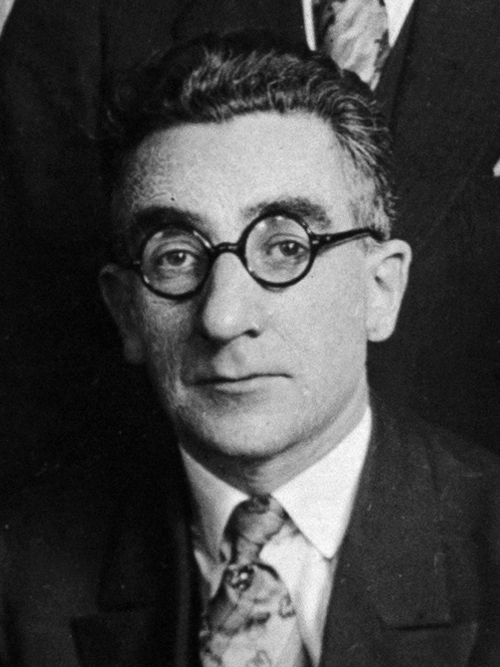
Epshtein c. 1922–1923

Shakne Epshtein (Note: First name also transliterated Shakhne, Shauchno, and Shachno; last name also transliterated Epstein.) (December 10, 1883 – July 21, 1945) was a Belarusian Jewish journalist, active in the United States and Soviet Union, who served as secretary and editor of the Jewish Anti-Fascist Committee (JAC)'s newspaper, Eynikayt (Unity). Solomon Mikhoels, the chairman of JAC, and Epshtein approached Vyacheslav Molotov, the Soviet foreign minister, with an idea to establish a Jewish autonomy in Crimea. The proposal was rejected.

Leadership of the Jewish Socialist Federation in 1917. Seated (L-R): Ben-Tsien Hofman (Tsivion), Max Goldfarb, Morris Winchevsky, A. Litvak, Hannah Salutsky, Moishe Terman. Standing: Shauchno Epstein, Frank Rozenblat, Baruch Charney Vladeck, Moissaye Olgin, Jacob Salutsky (J.B.S. Hardman).
