= A. Vayter =

Belarusian Jewish author, playwright, journalist, publisher, Yiddishist, and labor leader

- א. וַוַייטֶער
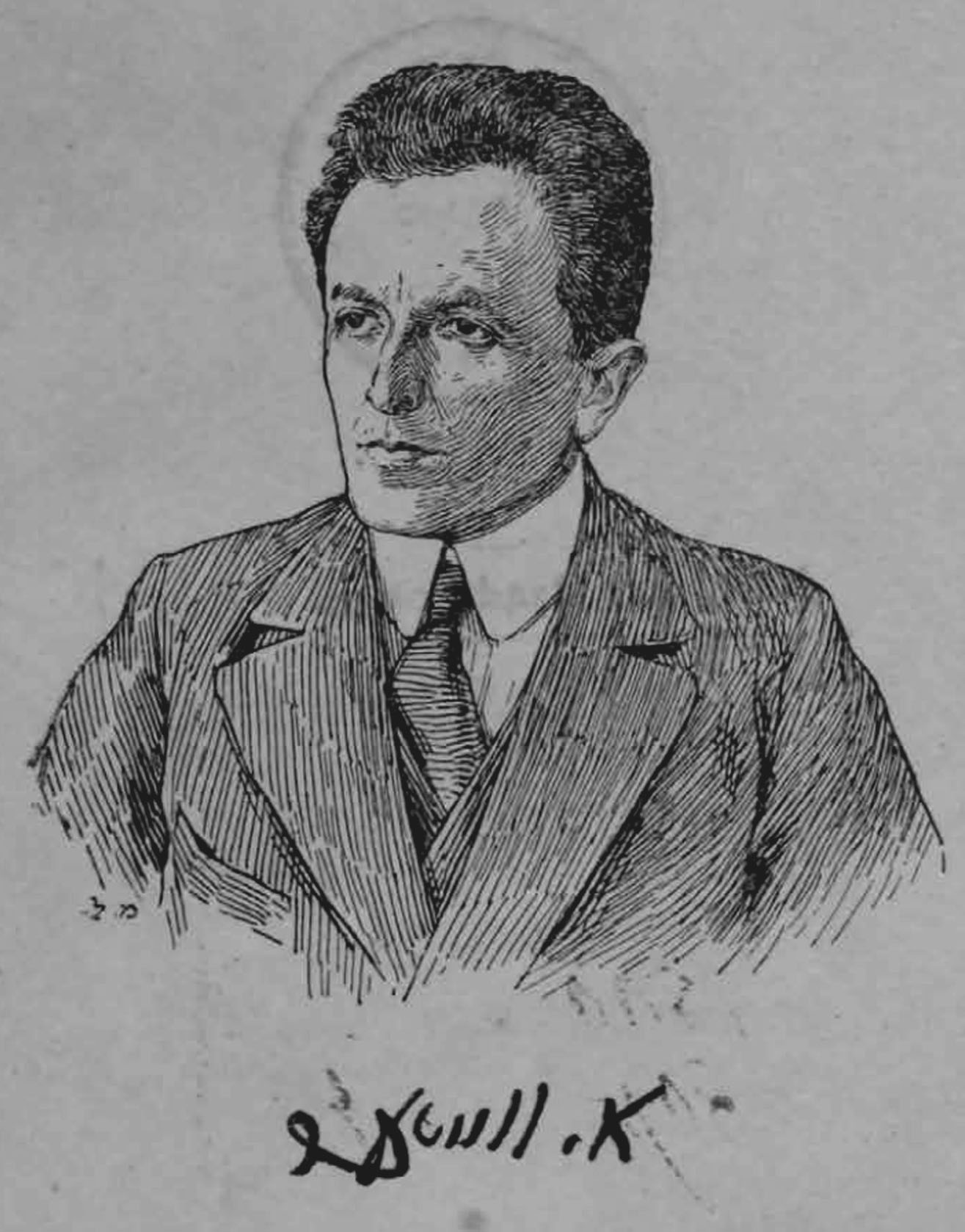
- Born: Yitzach Meir Devenishki; July , 1878; Bieniakoni, Russian Empire
- Died: April 21, 1919 (aged 40); Vilnius, Poland
- Resting place: Vilnius, Poland
- Occupations: Playwright, journalist, publisher, lecturer, translator, labor leader
- Writing career
- Pen name: A. Vayter
- Language: Yiddish, also Hebrew, Polish, Russian, German

Yitzach Meir Devenishki (ca. 1878 – April 21, 1919), also known by his pen name A. Vayter, (Note: also Vaiter, Waiter, Weiter) was a Jewish playwright, essayist, Yiddish Culture activist, and labor leader. Until about 1906, he was a leader in the Jewish Labor Party Bund; but due to policy disagreements at the 1906 Conference in Bern, Switzerland, after 1906, he devoted the rest of his life to what he termed the Yiddish Renaissance. He co-founded the Literarishe Monatshriftn (Literary Monthly Journal), first published in February 1908 in Vilnius, eight months before the Czernovitsh Conference (Yiddishist movement), being the first regularly published platform for Yiddish Literature in the world. Together with I. L. Peretz and Sholem Asch, among others, he was an early organizer of the Yiddish Theater movement: in January 1910, Peretz, together with Vayter, A. Mukdoni, and Hersh Dovid Nomberg, filled the Warsaw Philharmonic to overflowing for a “symposium” (a series of lectures given by the four speakers) about improving Yiddish theater. In 1910, he co-founded and then managed in Vilnius the most acclaimed Yiddish publishing house in the world, Kletzkin Publishers. During his short life, he also wrote plays, poetry, lyrics, stories, and essays.

== Biography ==
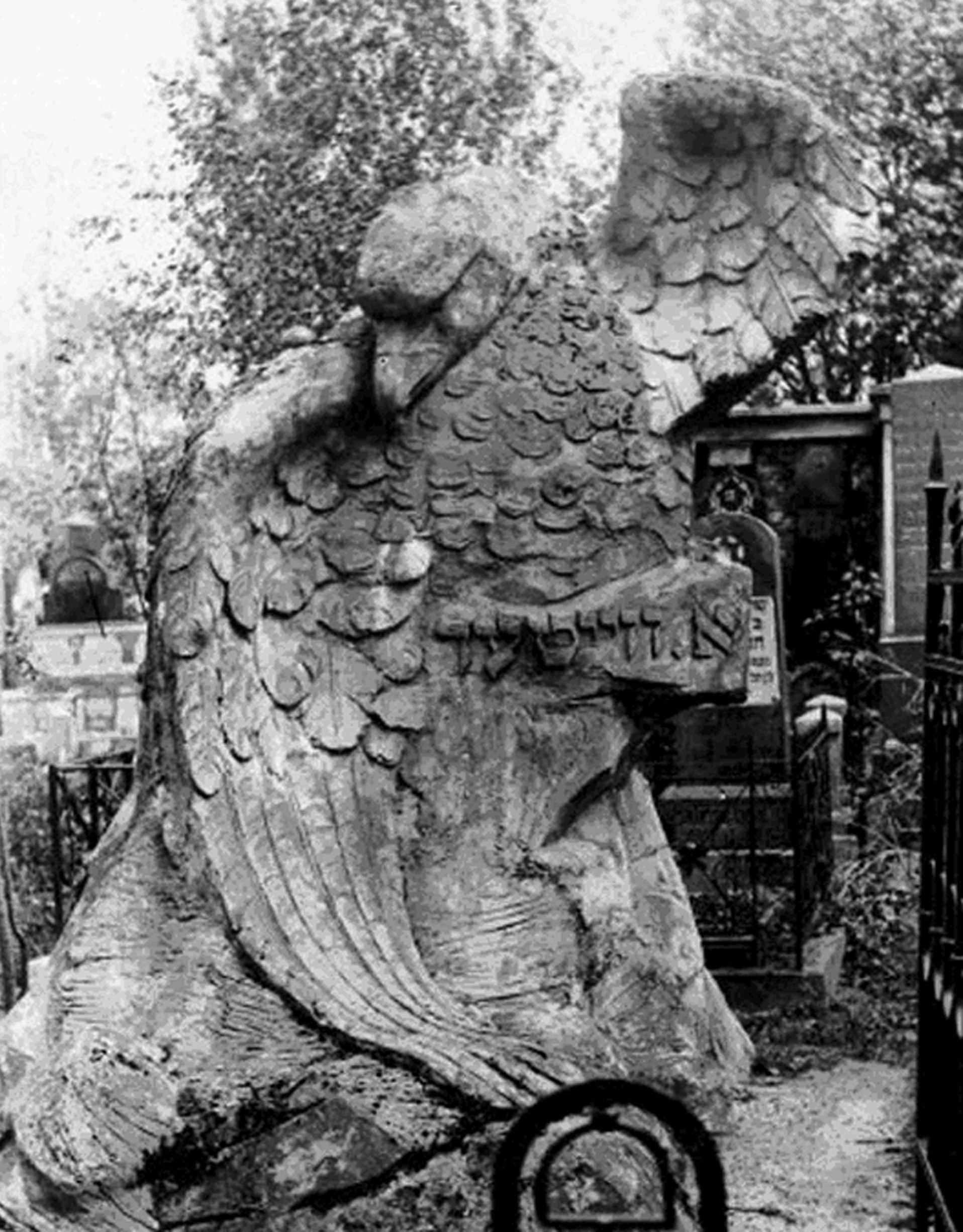
Grave Monument to A. Vayter in Vilnius (later damaged during WWII) (source: Ghetto Fighters' House Museum, Israel/ Photo Archive)

Yitzach Meir Devenishki was born in Bieniakoni (54°15′10.87″N 25°21′26.08″E), Vilnius Governorate, Russian Empire (now Belarus, previously Grand Duchy of Lithuania), to a large family widely distributed in the area of Dzevenishki, Great-Solechnik, Byenyakon, Voronovo, Lida, Vasilishok, Aishishok, Volozhin, Horodok, and Vilnius. He was from a family of rabbis, dayans, generally learned scholars, social entrepreneurs, and financial captains of various Lithuanian-Yiddish communities. Among the better-known modern descendants of the Devenishki-Benyakonski Clan are the nuclear physicist Samuel Devons and the soprano Masha Benya.

He studied for the rabbinate (including at the Eisiskes Kibbuts-Yeshiva, Smarhon (Smorgon) and Kaunas (Kovno) Yeshivas, and briefly with Yisrael Meir Kagan (Chofets Chaim), but was not ordained. He sat twice for the Russian university entrance exam, but was denied entry because his ideas were “too independent”. He married and became active in the Bund movement in Kovno and elsewhere. Vayter’s earlier Bund activities made him a subject of Russian Empire persecution and suspicion his entire life (making social and professional relationships difficult to sustain): he was imprisoned at both the Butyrka and Lukiskes Prisons, and exiled twice to Siberia, once in 1902—Tomsk—and again in 1912 to Turukhansk, when tired of the constant harassment he simply turned himself over to police.

A few months after returning to Vilnius in late 1918, he was murdered by Polish nationalists who took him for a Bolshevik (although living in Bolsehvik controlled Vilnius for a few months prior, he was no more a Bolshevik than their leader Jozef Pilsudski; his murder exemplifies the Polish pogroms occurring throughout the early Second Polish Republic: see Morgenthau Report ). At the time of his death, he was sketching a drama on the subject of Jewish-Polish-Lithuanian relations and planning a sojourn to his homeland, the Benyakoni District. His death became a symbol for the Yiddishist movement and he was honored as one its primary leaders by a grave monument and a tribute book including encomiums by Moshe Kulbak, Alter Kacyzne, S. An-sky, Zusman Segalovitsh, Samuel Leib Zitron, Mendel Elkin, Michael Weichert, Hersh Dovid Nomberg, Shmuel Niger, Zalman Reisen, and Dan-Pinkhes Kaplanovitsh

== Literary career ==
Vayter’s first play, Fartog (Daybreak) (1907), is a dramatic poem exploring the mind of Sonia, a young woman from an unnamed shtetl, who is studying chemistry in Bern, Switzerland. The play takes place almost entirely on the night following Bloody Sunday (1905), as she and her friends try to make sense of their lives and futures in the context of European events. Sonia’s inner turmoil is movingly expressed via a series of dream-like apparitions of ancestors, relatives, and symbolic figures, with whom Sonia discusses her feelings and actions.

In faier (In Fire) (1910) is a more conventional drama depicting a Jewish family in a rural area on St. John's Eve, which happens to fall on Shabbat that year. Melodies from the two celebrations commingle on and off stage as the family seeks to carry on with life in this highly charged and fire-ridden atmosphere. The play was published by Die Veldt (The World) in Vilnius in 1910 and was first produced there in 1919-20 by the Yiddish State Theater of Alexander Asro (nee Arliuk) and Sonia Alomis (both were original members of the Vilner Troupe, who decided to remain in Vilnius when the group moved to Warsaw), and directed by Mendel Elkin.

Der shtumer (The Mute) (1912) depicts a wedding day in Horodok, a shtetl near Vilnius, which is interrupted by the unexpected appearance of an old friend of the bride and groom, who, it turns out, was a former lover of the bride. The play was performed in Minsk prior to 1914 by M. Genfer’s company. During World War I, the play was not performed until 1917-18 when it was staged by the Vilner Troupe in Varshava, directed by Leib Kadison (nee Leyb Schuster) and starring Hertz Grosbard as Alexander, Miryam Szik as Hasiah, Morits Norvid as The Friend, and Matis Kowalski as The Father. According to Vilner Truppe actor Avram-Yankev Vayslits, the company "abandoned classical naturalism" and embraced "idealistic realism" in this production. The play was re-staged by the Vilner Truppe in Vienna in 1922, and then in 1926 (place unknown) with Henry Tarlo performing The play was staged in Moscow during Vayter’s lifetime. Asro, Alomis, Elkin, and Kadison eventually emigrated to the United States, where they remained professionally active.

All three plays have recently been published in an English translation; the E-Book edition is bilingual, featuring image reprints of the complete first editions of the three plays in Yiddish.

== Selected publications ==
- On the 48th Year in France, 1907
- Daybreak, 1907
- In Fire, 1910
- A Misfortune, 1910
- The Mute, 1912
- With the Shaman, 1920
- Writings, 1923 (a collection of non-fiction and fiction published posthumously)

== Sources ==
- Goldschmidt, A.Y. "Ayzik Meir Devenihski (Vayter): Zayn lebn un virken". In Goldschmidt, A.Y. (ed.). Ksovim (Writings) by A. Vayter. Vilnius, Poland: Vilna Publishing House of B.A. Kletzkin. pp. v–clxv.
- Caplan, Debra (2013). Staging Jewish Modernism: The Vilna Troupe and the Rise of a Transnational Yiddish Art Theater Movement. Cambridge, Massachusetts: Doctoral Dissertation, Harvard University.
- Veidlinger, Jeffrey. Jewish Public Culture in the Late Russian Empire. Bloomington and Indianapolis, Indiana, USA: Indiana University Press.
- Karlip, Joshua M. The Tragedy of a Generation: The Rise and Fall of Jewish Nationalism in Eastern Europe. Cambridge, Massachusetts, USA: Harvard University Press.
