= Adolph Held =

Jewish American newspaper editor, banker, and labor activist

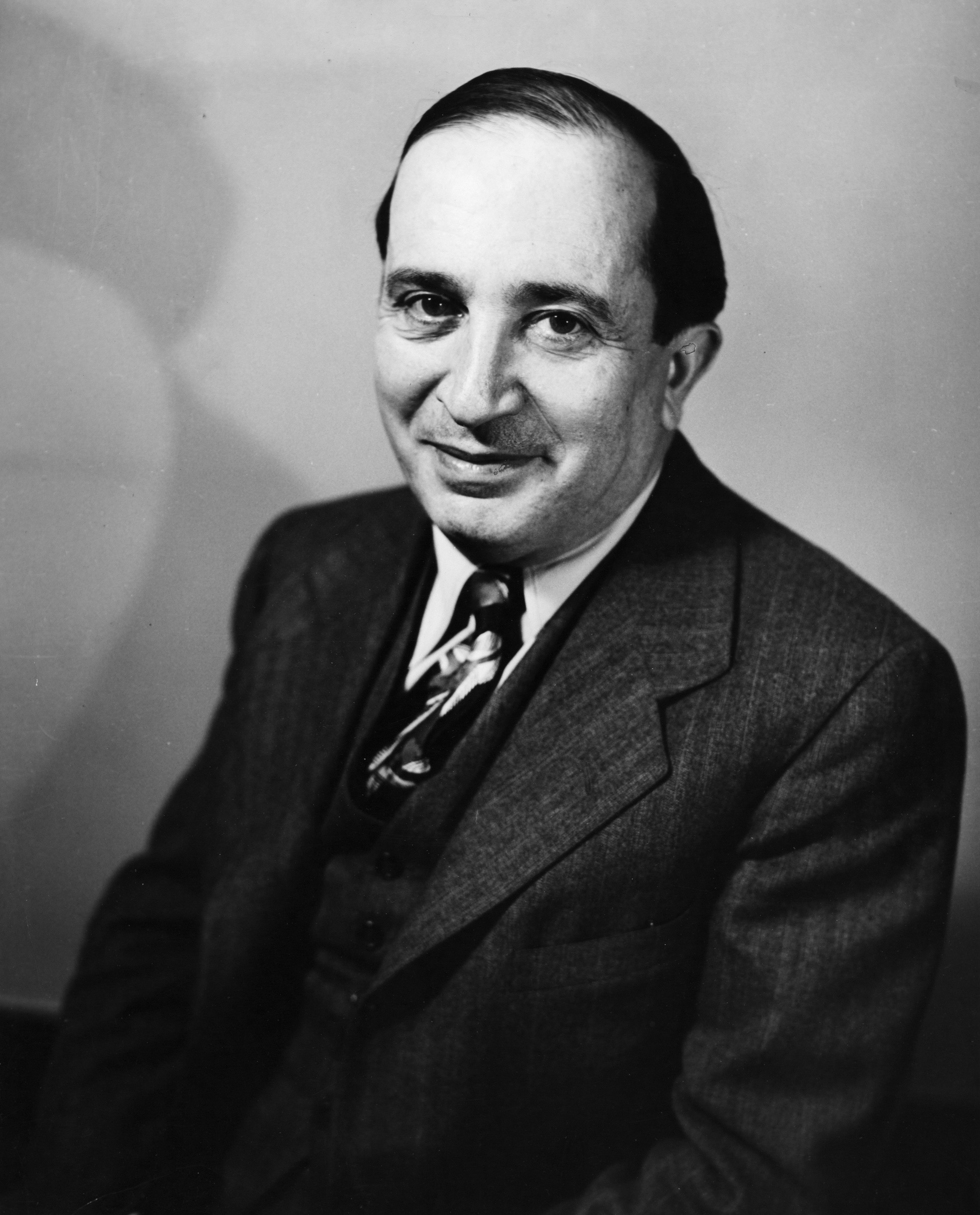
- Portrait by Harry Rubenstein c. 1940s

President of the Jewish Labor Committee
- In office October 30, 1938 – May 14, 1969
- Preceded by: Baruch Charney Vladeck
- Succeeded by: Charles S. Zimmerman

Member of the New York City Board of Aldermen from the 4th district
- In office January 1, 1918 – December 31, 1919
- Preceded by: Thomas M. Tobin
- Succeeded by: Louis Zeltner

Personal details
- Born: May 16, 1885 Boryslav, Kingdom of Galicia and Lodomeria, Austro-Hungarian Empire
- Died: May 14, 1969 (aged 83) New York City, New York, U.S.
- Party: Socialist
- Spouse: Lillian Michaels (m. 1913; died 1954)
- Education: City College of New York
- Occupation: Newspaper editor, politician, banker, labor leader

Adolph Held (May 16, 1885 – May 14, 1969) was a Galician-born Jewish American newspaper editor, politician, banker, and labor leader. He served as president of the Jewish Labor Committee from the death of his predecessor Baruch Charney Vladeck in 1938 until his own death in 1969. He was also a Socialist member of the New York City Board of Aldermen from 1918 to 1919.

== Life ==
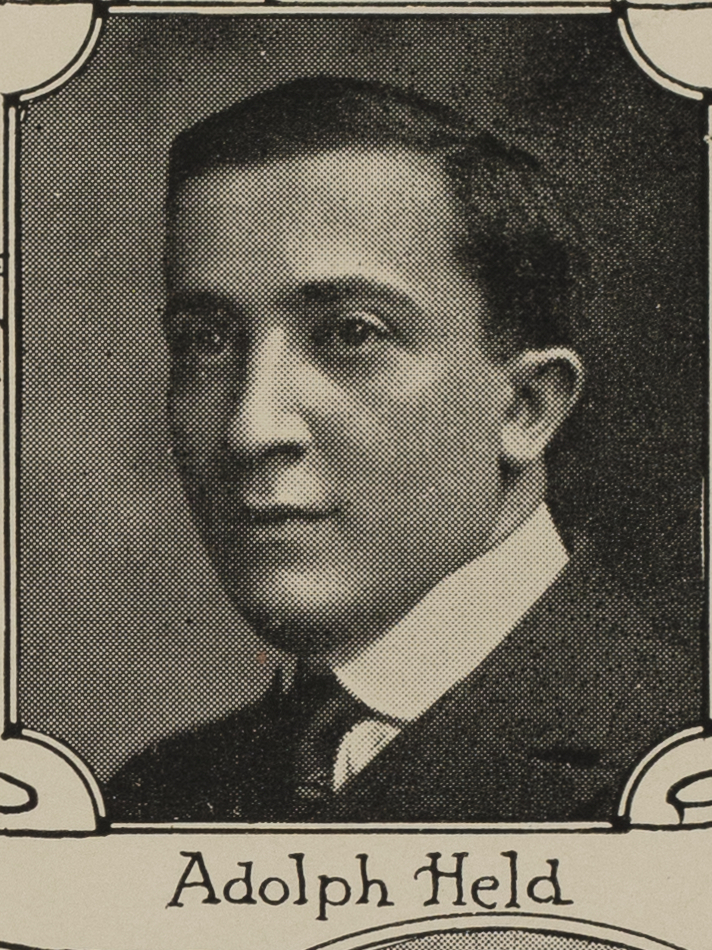
Held c. 1917

Held was born on May 16, 1885, in Boryslav, Austro-Hungarian Empire, the son of Jacob Held and Tauba Yetta Singer. He immigrated to America in 1893.

Held attended the College of the City of New York, graduating from there with a B.S. in 1906. From 1907 to 1912, he was the city editor of The Jewish Daily Forward, a leading Yiddish socialist newspaper. From 1912 to 1917, he worked as its business manager. In 1917, he was elected as a Socialist to the New York City Board of Aldermen Fourth District, defeating Democrat Henry S. Schimmel. He ran for re-election in 1919, but he lost to Louis Zeltner, who ran with support from both Republicans and Democrats.

In 1920, Held was appointed European director of the Hebrew Immigrant Aid Society. In that capacity, he assisted hundreds of thousands of Jews immigrating to the United States. When he returned to America in 1924, he became president of the Forward Association, the Forward's governing body. From 1925 to 1928, he served as vice-president of the Amalgamated Bank. He became president of the bank in 1928, and during the Wall Street Crash of 1929 it was considered one of the safest banks in the city. He was chairman of the board of directors of the radio station WEVD and chairman of the Amalgamated Co-operative Housing Association. After he relinquished the presidency of the Amalgamated Bank in 1945, he became welfare director of the International Ladies Garment Workers Union. He was a central figure in founding the Jewish Labor Committee in 1933, serving as its president emeritus when he died. He was president of the Golden Ring Council of Senior Citizens and was active in extending Social Security payments and establishing Medicare. He was president of the Forward Association until 1962, when he became general manager of the Forward. He retired from that position in 1967.

He was a member of the presidium of the Conference on Jewish Material Claims Against Germany in 1952. With Louis Hollander, he was a founder of ORT, chairman of the American Labor ORT, member of the central board of the World ORT Union, and vice president of the American ORT Federation. He was a founder and member of the JDC and a member of the Israel Bond Organization.

Held was a member of the Workmen's Circle. In 1913, he married Lillian Michaels. She died in 1954, and they had no children.

Held died in the Workmen's Circle Home and Hospital for the Aged in the Bronx on May 14, 1969, two days before his 84th birthday. He was buried in Mount Hebron Cemetery.

Trade union offices
Preceded by Baruch Charney Vladeck	President of the Jewish Labor Committee; 1938–1969	Succeeded by Charles S. Zimmerman
