= Daniel Charney =

Yiddish poet and journalist (1888–1959)

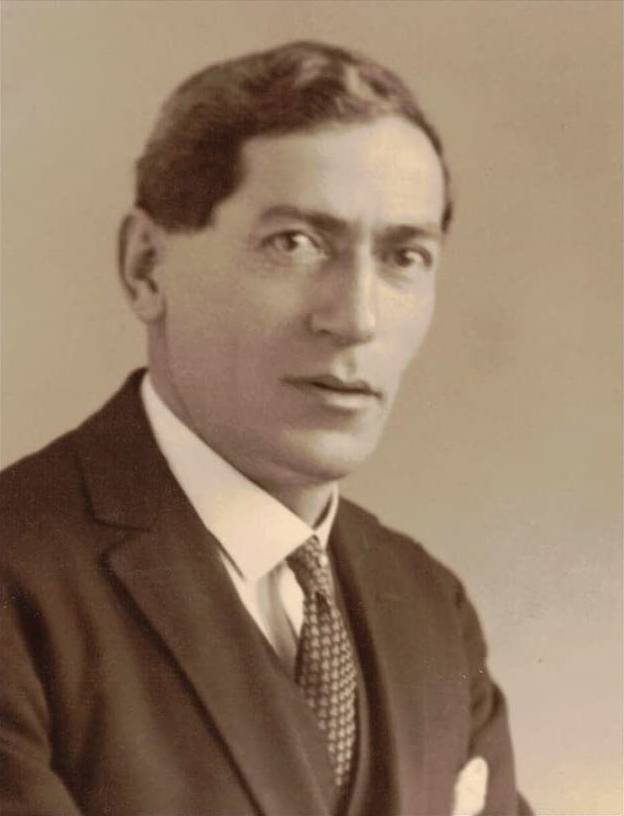
Daniel Charney

Daniel Charney (1888–1959) (דניאל טשאַרני), was a Yiddish poet, memoirist, and journalist.

Born in Dukora (now part of Belarus), Charney was active in Moscow Yiddish circles in the early 1920s. He attempted immigration to New York in 1925, but was sent back due to illness. He lived in Moscow, Vilna, Warsaw, Berlin, Bern, Geneva, and Paris, and finally emigrated successfully to New York in 1941.

He suffered from severe illness his entire life, and, as his memoirs attest, spent much of his life in various sanitaria, clinics, and hospitals, including Mount Sinai Hospital and the Workmen's Circle tuberculosis sanatorium in Liberty, New York. He worked for the Yiddish daily newspaper Der Tog from 1925 until his death in 1959 (aged 70-71).

The youngest of six siblings, he was closest to brothers Shmuel Niger, an important Yiddish literary critic, and labor leader and journalist Baruch Charney Vladeck.

== Bibliography ==
- Mishpokhe khronik (Vilna, 1927)
- Barg aroyf (memuarn) (Warsaw, 1935)
- A yor tsendlik aza (memuarn) (New York, 1943)
- Oyfn shvel fun yener velt: tipn, bilder, epizodn (New York, 1947)
- Dukor (Toronto, 1951)
- Vilna (Buenos Aires, 1951)
- A litvak in Poyln (New York, 1955)
- Mayne doktoyrim and A togbukh fun okupirtn Pariz (Tel Aviv, 1963)

=== In English ===
- Dukor (trans. Michael Skakun), JewishGen Press (2022)
