= Jewish Labor Committee =

American Jewish labor organization

JLC
- Jewish Labor Committee
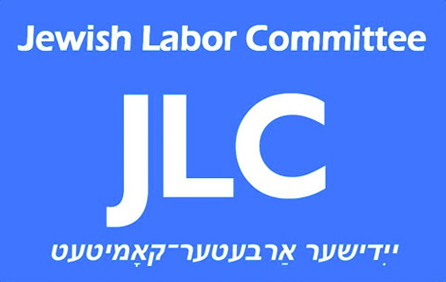

- May Day celebration, circa 1939
- Founded: 1934; 92 years ago
- Headquarters: 140 West 31st Street, 2nd Floor, New York, NY 10001
- Location(s): United States (current), Canada (1936–1970s)
- Affiliations: AFL–CIO (allied group); Change to Win (working relationship); Canadian Labour Congress (until the 1970s)
- Website: www.jewishlabor.org

The Jewish Labor Committee (JLC) is an American secular Jewish labor organization founded in 1934 to oppose the rise of Nazism in Germany. Among its central purposes is promoting labor union interests in the organized Jewish communities, especially in the United States, and Jewish interests within U.S. labor unions. The organization is headquartered in New York City, where it was founded, with local/regional offices in Boston, New York City, Philadelphia, Chicago and Los Angeles, and volunteer-led affiliated groups in other U.S. communities. Today, it works to maintain and strengthen the historically strong relationship between the American Jewish community and the trade union movement, and to promote what they see as the shared social justice agenda of both communities. The JLC was also active in Canada from 1936 until the 1970s where it was led by Kalmen Kaplansky.

== History ==
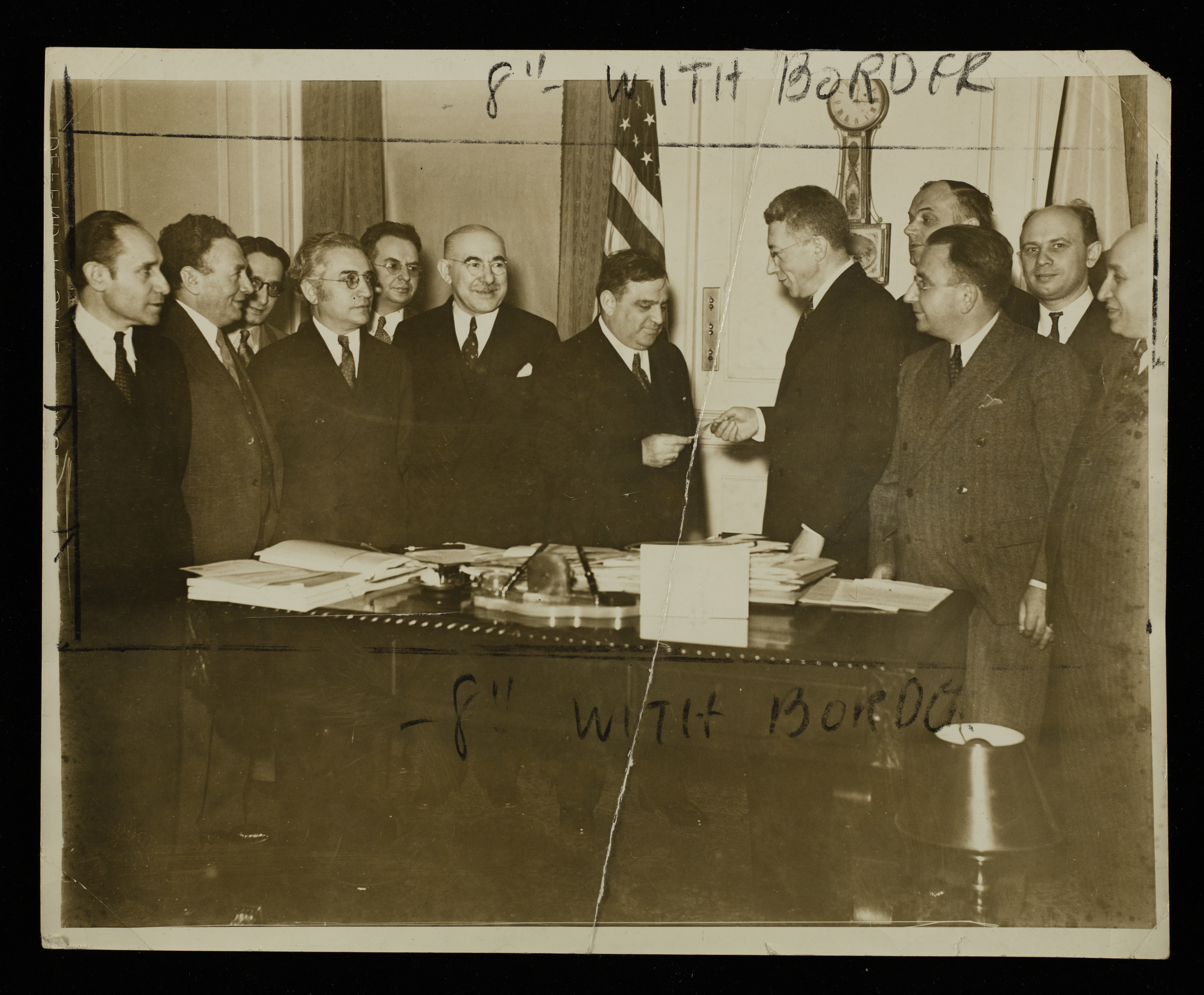
JLC leaders meet with New York City Mayor Fiorello LaGuardia c. 1938

The Jewish Labor Committee was formed on February 25, 1934 by Yiddish-speaking immigrant trade union leaders, including leaders of established groups such as The Workmen's Circle, the Jewish Labor Bund, and the United Hebrew Trades, in response to the rise of Nazism in Germany. One thousand delegates representing 400,000 members, most of them in the Amalgamated Clothing Workers of America and the International Ladies Garment Workers Union, assembled at a conference on New York's Lower East Side, electing its first president, Baruch Charney Vladeck, and charging it with the following tasks:

- support of Jewish labor institutions in European countries;
- assistance to the anti-Hitler underground movement;
- aid to the victims of Nazism;
- cooperation with American organized labor in fighting anti-democratic forces; and
- combating antisemitism and other effects of Fascism and Nazism upon American life.

At the urging of B.C. Vladeck and Jewish union leaders, the American Federation of Labor (AFL) came out in favor of a boycott of Nazi goods at its 1933 convention. At the 1934 AFL convention, Vladeck argued that the Nazi persecution of Jews was part of a general assault on labor rights and political liberty. The AFL responded by created the "Labor Chest" to aid victims of fascism; in the following years, the Chest funded a host of JLC-inspired educational and aid projects.

During the first five years of its existence, the Jewish Labor Committee concentrated mainly on engaging in encouraging and strengthening U.S. and Canadian opposition to the Nazis, in the labor and democratic left, as well as in the community-at-large; supporting anti-Nazi labor forces in Europe, and sending relief to Jewish labor institutions there, especially those maintained by the Jewish Labor Bund and the left wing of the Labor Zionist movement (the right-wing Labor Zionists organized their own relief and rehabilitation committee). At the same time it organized mass anti-Nazi demonstrations, and, in 1936, with the American Jewish Congress, through the Joint Boycott Council, it conducted a boycott on German goods and services.

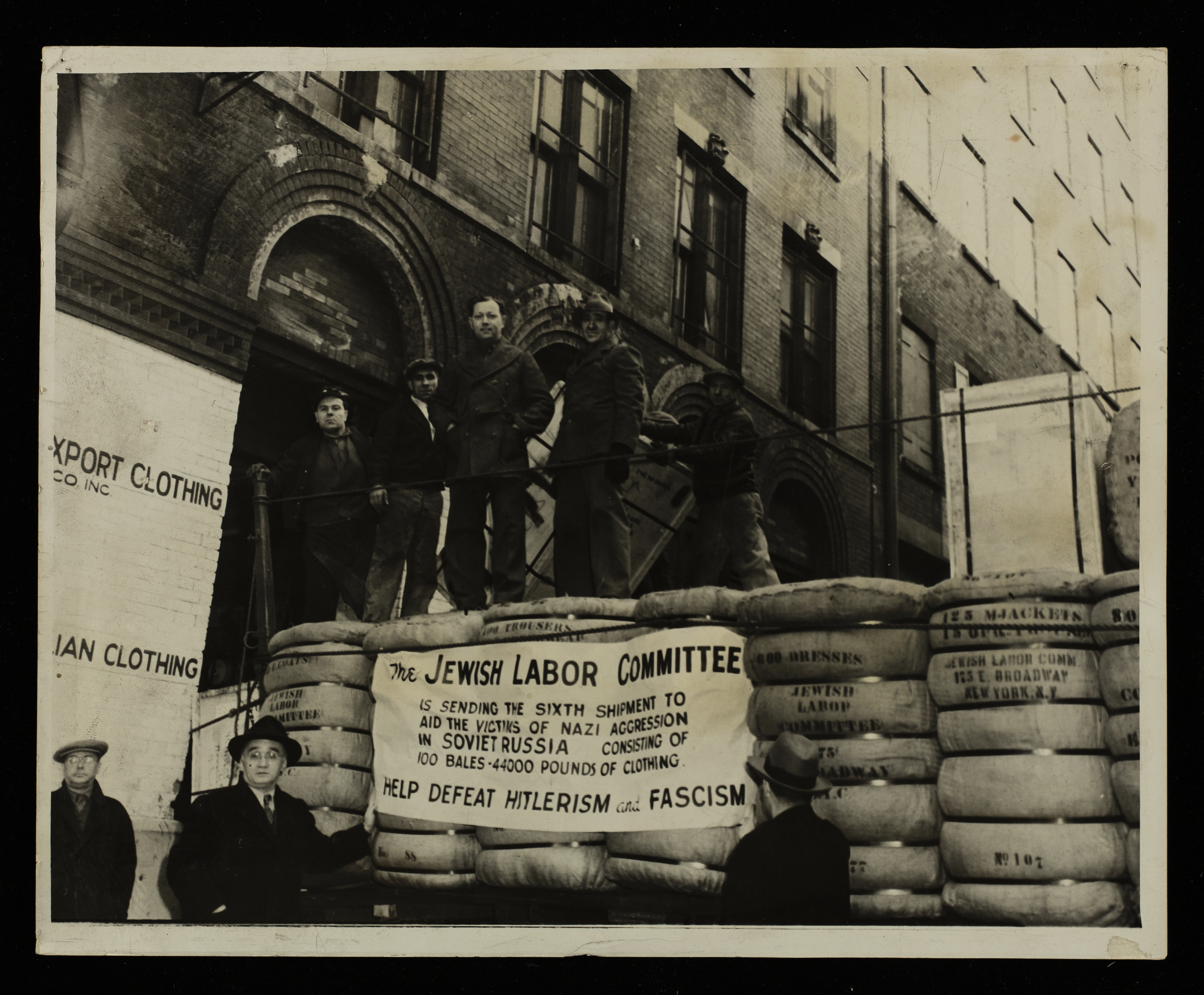
Members of the JLC with aid marked for the Soviet Union c. 1941

After the outbreak of World War II, the emphasis focused on efforts to save Jewish cultural and political figures, as well as Jewish and non-Jewish labor and socialist leaders facing certain death at the hands of the Nazis. With powerful help from the American Federation of Labor, the Committee succeeded in bringing over a thousand of such individuals to the United States, or to temporary shelter elsewhere.

The JLC's main focus was unified action, but also took independent action for their anti-Nazi campaign. When the American Olympics Committee declined to boycott the Berlin Olympics of 1936, the JLC held a World Labor Athletic Carnival (also known as the Counter-Olympics) at Randall's Island in New York City. Dozens of teams representing New York union locals competed, and featured amateur athletes from across the country. NY Governor Herbert Lehman presented the awards. The Carnival received extensive nationwide press coverage, and the JLC repeated the event in the summer of 1937.

After the war, the JLC organized a Child Adoption Program. The program was not meant to provide adoption in the usual sense, but rather to provide a mechanism by which Americans could contribute to the care of children living in Europe or Israel. At a cost of $300 per year, a union shop or local, fraternal society, Workmen's Circle branch, women's club, or any other group or individual could "adopt" a child. Thousands of children were supported through this program into the 1950s.

Beginning in the late 1930s, the Committee became increasingly concerned with Jewish defense work and community relations in the United States. It was one of the four founders of the short-lived General Jewish Council and helped organize the National Community Relations Advisory Council (renamed the Jewish Council for Public Affairs (JCPA) in the 1990s), of which it is still an active member.

Adolph Held was president for 30 years.

Stuart Appelbaum is the current president.

== Activities ==
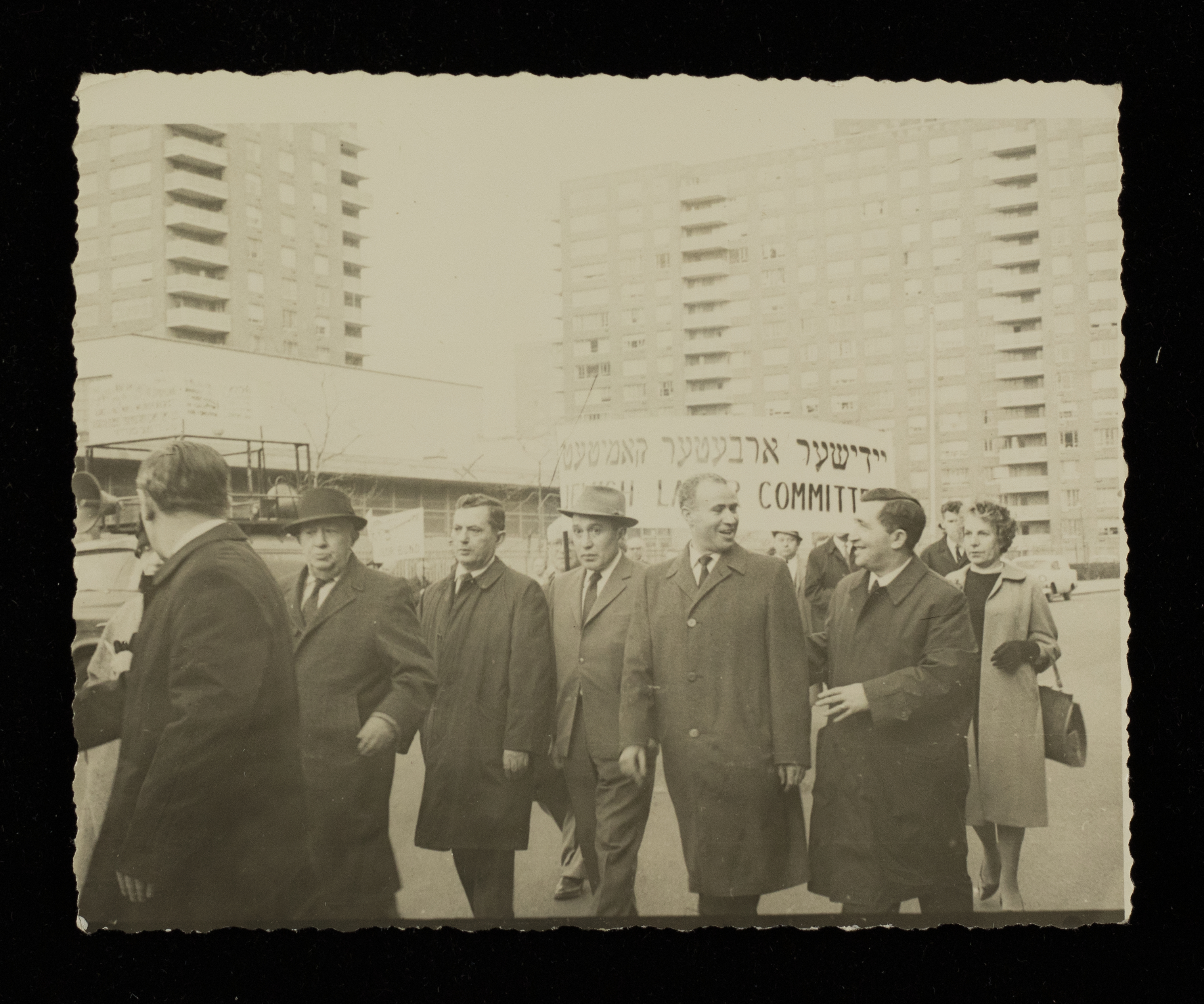
A JLC march c. 1938–1942

Unlike other community relations agencies, the JLC has its sphere of action clearly delineated: it strives to represent Jewish communal interests in the labor movement, and labor interests in the organized Jewish community. Working with the AFL–CIO since its formation in 1956, and the Change to Win federation since the CtW's formation in 2005, and their affiliated trade unions, the JLC works with and has the support of a wide range of unions and their associated organizations, locally, nationally and internationally.

With diverse organizations as affiliates representing a variety of ideological groups, the Committee has been guided in its work by pragmatic policies rather than by a specific philosophy. While Bundist influence was significant in the organization, particularly in the early period, JLC been critically supportive of the State of Israel since 1948. Both Ameinu (formerly known as the Labor Zionist Alliance and Partners for Progressive Israel (formerly known as Meretz USA) are affiliates of the JLC, as is The Workmen's Circle. The JLC can broadly speaking be considered part of what is sometimes called the Jewish left in America.

In 2000, the JLC began an annual tradition of holding local "Labor Seders" in communities throughout the U.S. These "Labor Seders" are often held in conjunction with local Central Labor Councils and local Jewish Community Relations Councils, and serve as a way for local Jewish and labor leaders to come together and share an engaging experience, and relate the traditional Passover exodus from Egypt story to more recent examples of the struggle for basic worker's rights. Emulating these "Labor Seders," a similar "Union Seder" was organized in Sydney, Australia in 2006.

In addition to the Jewish Council for Public Affairs, the JLC is a founding member of a number of other U.S. and international Jewish communal agencies, including the Conference of Presidents of Major American Jewish Organizations, the Memorial Foundation for Jewish Culture, the Conference on Jewish Material Claims Against Germany, and the National Conference on Soviet Jewry.

The New England Region of the JLC is a partner organization of the Boston-based JOIN for Justice (formerly known as the Jewish Organizing Initiative), which was formed in 1994 as a mechanism for young adults to enter the field of community organizing through an explicitly Jewish channel. Through it, the JLC's field office in Boston secured a number of regional directors and interns.

The JLC's funding comes from independent campaigns, contributions from trade unions, allocations from Jewish community federations, grants from foundations, individual members and organizational affiliates. (Originally a body of organizations and unions, the Committee has also had individual members since the mid-1960s.)

== Civil rights ==
The JLC founded an Anti-Discrimination Division immediately after World War II, which agitated and lobbied in favor of Fair Employment Practices legislation, equal opportunities in education and integrated housing.

In Canada, in the 1940s and 1950s, the Jewish Labour Committee played a leading role in opposing racial discrimination legislation and supporting human rights. Executive Director Kalmen Kaplansky believed that it was necessary to extend the JLC's mandate beyond fighting antisemitism to combat discrimination against all minorities and involve non-Jews, and the broader labor movement, in the JLC's civil rights work. Under his leadership, the JLC spearheaded the formation of Joint Labour Committees to Combat Racial Discrimination in Toronto, Windsor, Montreal, Vancouver and Winnipeg, which advocated the adoption of human rights codes by provincial governments and which launched challenges against segregation and discriminatory employment and business practices. The JLC also publicly recognized labor leaders and pro-labor politicians who advanced the cause of Civil Rights with testimonial dinners held in their honor. Recipients include AFL President William Green (1951), Illinois AFL–CIO President Reuben Soderstrom (1953), Minnesota Senator (and future Vice President Hubert Humphrey (1954), and AFL–CIO President George Meany (1967).

The JLC also formed approximately two dozen local committees in the United States to combat racial intolerance. These committees were the genesis of the American Federation of Labor's Civil Rights Department as well as the civil rights departments of several unions in the 1940s and 1950s. The JLC distributed literature and educational material combatting racism and played a role in state and national campaigns for civil rights legislation. The JLC played a role in the Leadership Conference for Civil Rights and participated in and helped organize civil rights marches and protests in the 1950s and 1960s co-ordinating many local campaigns. The JLC helped found the United Farm Workers, campaigned for the passage of the Fair Employment Practices Act in California and provided staffing and support for the 1963 March on Washington for Jobs and Freedom led by Martin Luther King Jr.

== Controversies ==
=== Allegations of defending discriminatory union practices ===
NAACP labor director Herbert Hill said that, during the 1940s through the 1960s, the JLC had defended anti-Black and anti-Hispanic discriminatory practices of unions in the garment industry and building industry. Hill claimed that the JLC changed "a black white conflict into a Black-Jewish conflict".

=== Anti-Communism ===
The JLC, as part of the National Community Relations Advisory Council, opposed the Rosenberg Committee, believing them to be a Communist group. The council issued a statement that the Rosenberg Committee's accusation that the Rosenberg trial was motivated by antisemitism was causing public panic within the Jewish community. Jewish Communists in the 1950s compared the JLC and other anti-communist Jewish groups to the Judenrat. Writing for Commentary, the anti-communist historian Lucy Dawidowicz said this characterization was part of a "smear campaign".

== Presidents ==
1934: Baruch Charney Vladeck
1938: Adolph Held
1969: Charles S. Zimmerman
1974: Jack Sheinkman
1979: Donald S. Slaiman
1983: Herb Magidson
1989: Lenore Miller
1999: Morton Bahr
2001: Stuart Appelbaum

== See also ==
- They Were Not Silent – a documentary about the Jewish Labor Committee's response to Hitler and World War II
