= Baruch Charney Vladeck =

Jewish American labor leader, journalist and politician (1886-1938)

- ברוך טשאַרני וולאַדעק
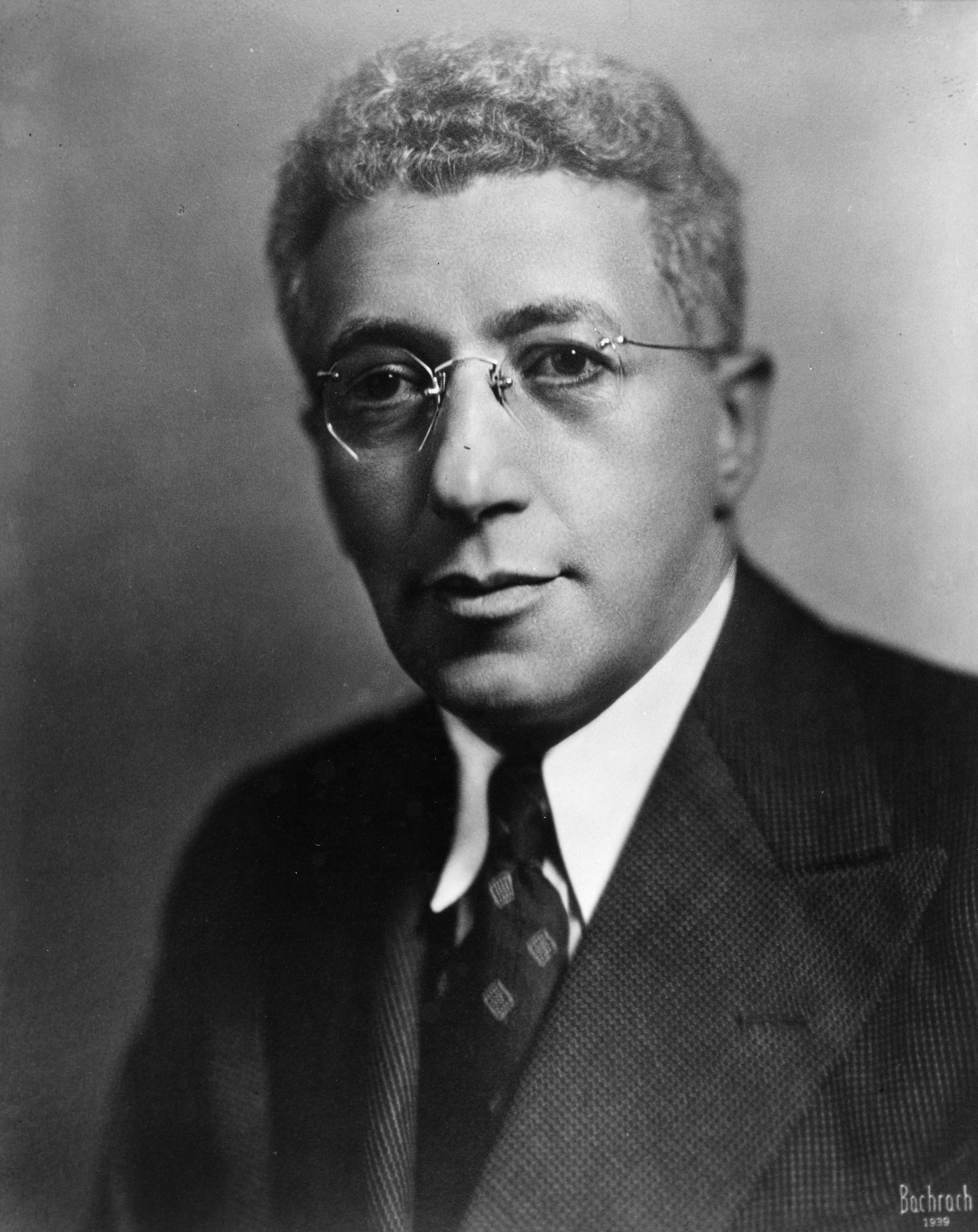
- Portrait by Bachrach Studios c. 1937

President of the Jewish Labor Committee
- In office February 25, 1934 – October 30, 1938
- Preceded by: Position established
- Succeeded by: Adolph Held

Majority Leader of the New York City Council
- In office January 11, 1938 – September 23, 1938
- President: Newbold Morris
- Preceded by: Timothy J. Sullivan (Note: as Majority Leader of the New York City Board of Aldermen)
- Succeeded by: John Cashmore

Minority Leader of the New York City Council
- In office September 23, 1938 – October 30, 1938
- President: Newbold Morris
- Preceded by: John Cashmore
- Succeeded by: Andrew R. Armstrong

Member of the New York City Council from Manhattan At-Large
- In office January 1, 1938 – October 30, 1938
- Preceded by: Constituency established
- Succeeded by: George Backer

Member of the New York City Board of Aldermen from the 56th district
- In office January 1, 1918 – December 31, 1921
- Preceded by: Harry Heyman
- Succeeded by: Morris Soloman

Personal details
- Born: Baruch Nachman Charney; January 13, 1886 Dukor, Minsk Governorate, Russian Empire
- Died: October 30, 1938 (aged 52) New York City, New York, U.S.
- Resting place: Mount Carmel Cemetery
- Party: Poale Zion (1903–1904); Bund (1904–1908); RSDLP (1907); Socialist (1908–1936); American Labor (1936–1938)
- Spouse: Clara Richman (m. 1911)
- Children: May; William; Stephen
- Relatives: Shmuel Niger (brother); Daniel Charney (brother); Judith Vladeck (daughter-in-law); David Vladeck (grandson); David Bromberg (grandson); Steve Vladeck (great-grandson)
- Education: University of Pennsylvania
- Occupation: Labor leader, newspaper manager, politician
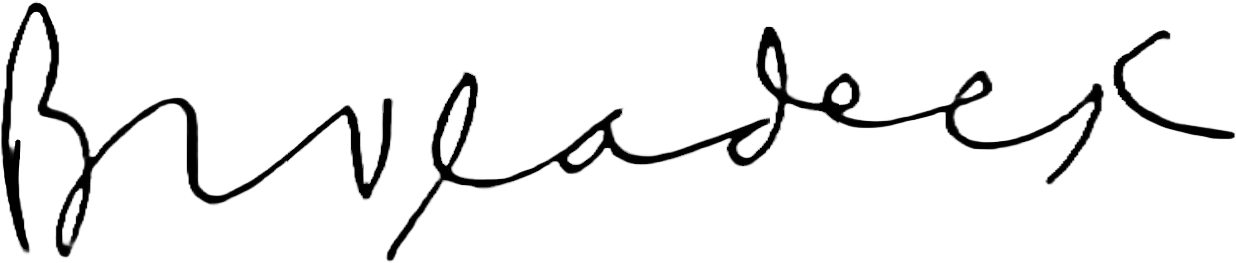
- Signature
- Nickname: "The Second Lassalle"
- Baruch Charney Vladeck's voice Vladeck endorses the work of the Medem Sanatorium in Poland for the American introduction to Mir Kumen On; Recorded 1938

Baruch Charney Vladeck (Yiddish: ברוך טשאַרני וולאַדעק; born Baruch Nachman Charney; (Note: Also transliterated Borekh Nakhmen Tsharni (Yiddish: ברוך נחמן טשאַרני)) January 13, 1886 – October 30, 1938) was a Belarusian-born Jewish American labor leader, journalist and politician who was general manager of The Jewish Daily Forward from 1918 until his death in 1938. He was a member of the New York City Board of Aldermen and later the New York City Council, serving as the first majority leader of that body from January to September 1938. He was also a co-founder of the American Labor Party, serving as its leader on the City Council during his tenure.

== Life in the Russian Empire ==
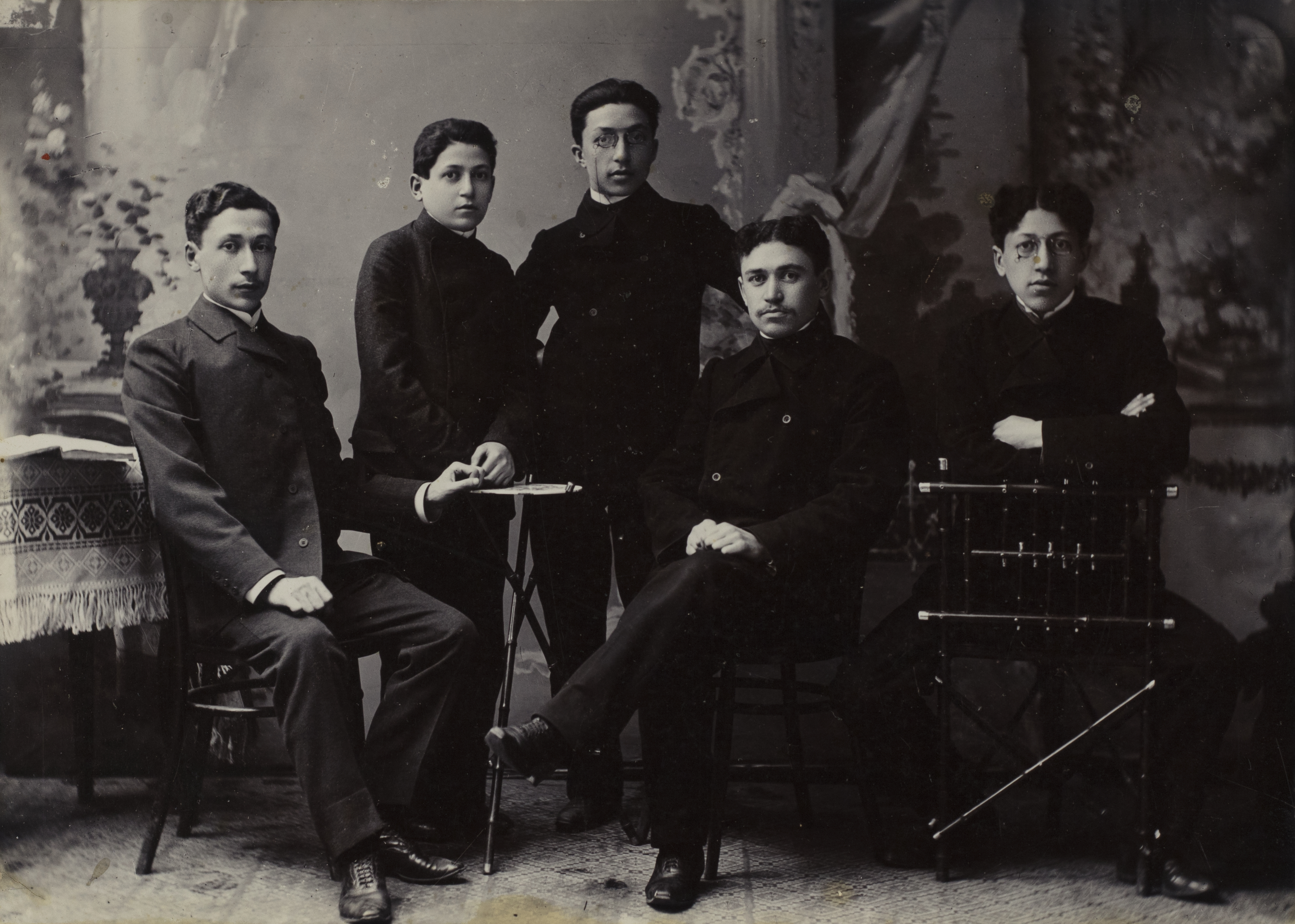
The Charney brothers in Minsk c. 1900. (L-R): Mendel, Daniel, Shmuel, Zolke and Baruch.

Baruch Charney was born January 13, 1886, in Dukor, a small village near Minsk, in what is now Belarus. His parents were Zev Volf and Brokhe Tsharni (née Hurwitz). His father, a fervent Lubavitcher Hasid, died in 1889, leaving his mother a widow with five sons (he was the fourth) and a daughter. Two of his brothers also achieved renown: literary critic Shmuel Niger and Yiddish poet Daniel Charney. Baruch was self-taught, preparing for his gymnasium exams on his own. He studied Jewish and secular sciences.

Baruch Charney was first drawn to the revolutionary movement for the overthrow of the Tsarist autocracy in the early 1900s. After the Kishinev pogrom in 1903, he began de politicise. He was arrested in January 1904 for conducting a radical study circle for young workers, although according to his children his offense was merely recommending Tolstoy to someone at the library. He spent eight months in jail, during which he met older, more radical socialists belonging to the General Jewish Labour Bund, and was converted to their cause. After the Bund posted his bail in September, he formally joined the group and became an organizer.

=== 1905 Revolution ===
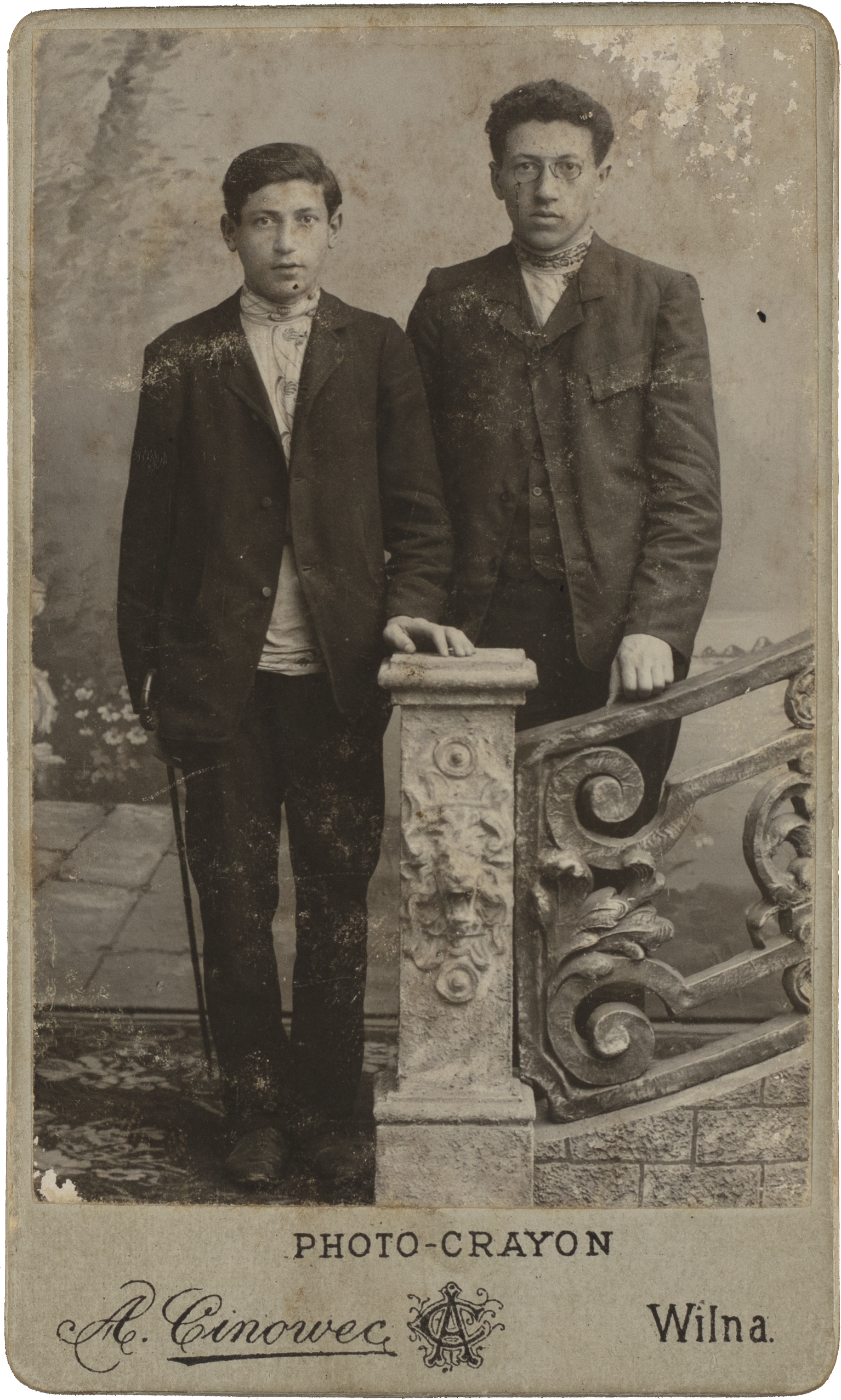
Baruch and Daniel Charney in Wilno, 1905

During the Russian Revolution of 1905, Charney was sent by the Bund to lead a workers' march into urban Minsk. While crossing an open plain, they were attacked by Cossacks, one of whom slashed Charney's face with a sword. Now hunted by the police in Minsk, the Bund sent Charney on a party mission to Vilna, where he earned a reputation as a skilled orator and came to be known as "the Second Lassalle". Charney was arrested a second time in 1905, but was released a few months later following the Tsar's October Manifesto and its subsequent amnesties.

Charney was sent next to Poland, narrowly avoiding capture in Lublin before suffering his third arrest in Łódź. It was during this time that he adopted the pseudonym "Vladeck" as a nom de guerre. Baruch Charney would use this as his surname for the rest of his life.

In 1907, Vladeck was named as a Bund delegate to the 5th Congress of the Russian Social Democratic Labour Party in London, representing the Vitebsk district under the pseudonym "Broches". During the Congress, he met Vladimir Lenin, who deeply impressed him. Vladeck would be the only Bundist to support Lenin on policy and in his bid for the Central Committee.

The reforms brought about by the 1905 Revolution did not last, and by 1907 the Bund faced pogroms and repression. Seeing further arrest as inevitable, Vladeck decided that emigration to the United States was his most realistic option. In 1908 he left Europe for North America, landing at Ellis Island on Thanksgiving Day, soon after which he began to immerse himself in the study of American history and culture.

== Life in America ==
Leadership of the Jewish Socialist Federation in 1917. Seated (L-R): Ben-Tsien Hofman, Max Goldfarb, Morris Winchevsky, A. Litvak, Hannah Salutsky, and Moishe Terman. Standing: Shauchno Epstein, Frank Rozenblat, Baruch Charney Vladeck, Moissaye Olgin, and Jacob Salutsky.

In America, Vladeck made use of his previous experience as a public speaker, traveling extensively for four years (sponsored by the Jewish Agitation Bureau) and giving public lectures on a variety of social, political, and economic topics. The socialist Jewish Daily Forward affectionately dubbed him "the Young Lassalle", echoing his earlier moniker. During this time, Vladeck's idealistic perception of America would be tempered by encounters with Jim Crow racism in the South and violent strikebreaking in Philadelphia.

Vladeck joined the staff of The Forward in 1912 as manager of its Philadelphia branch, while also studying at the Teachers' College of the University of Pennsylvania. He became a naturalized citizen in 1915 and made his first run for public office the same year, campaigning unsuccessfully for Judge of the Philadelphia Orphans' Court on the Socialist ticket.

In 1916, Forward editor Abraham Cahan invited Vladeck to New York to become city manager of the paper. By this point, he was an active member of the Socialist Party and its Yiddish-language affiliate, the Jewish Socialist Federation. During that year's elections, he became an important ally of Meyer London, a fellow Jewish emigrant from the Russian Empire, and aided him in his re-election campaign. Vladeck himself ran for State Senate, coming in third place with 20 percent of the vote. When the Russian Revolution broke out a few months later, he celebrated the downfall of the Tsardom with the rest of the Forward staff, but decided that America had become his home and chose not to return.

=== New York City Board of Aldermen ===
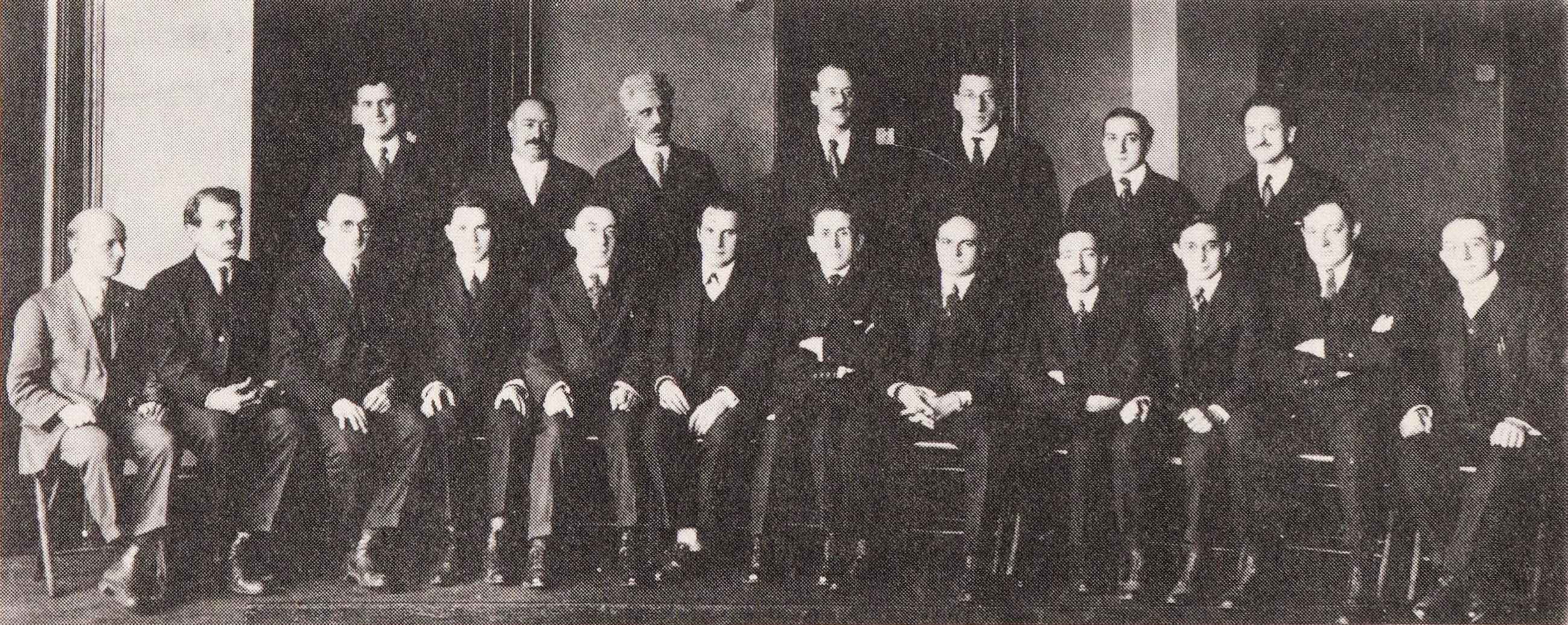
Socialists elected in New York City, 1917. Standing (L-R): Abraham Beckerman, Barnet Wolff, Alexander Braunstein, Algernon Lee, Baruch Charney Vladeck, Adolph Held, and Maurice Calman. Seated: August Claessens, William Feigenbaum, Elmer Rosenberg, Louis Waldman, Joseph Whitehorn, Jacob Panken, Abraham Shiplacoff, William Karlin, Samuel Orr, Charles B. Garfinkel, Benjamin Gitlow, and Joseph A. Weil.

Following America's entry into World War I in 1917, the Socialist Party's anti-war stance won it many new votes in ethnic strongholds such as Milwaukee and New York from conservative German-Americans who also opposed the war. That year, the Socialist Party of New York fielded a full ticket for the State Senate, State Assembly, and Board of Aldermen, with Vladeck chosen to run in the Board's 56th district representing the Williamsburg neighborhood of Brooklyn. Campaigning in both Yiddish and English, Vladeck drew heavy crowds and would ultimately win the election against Democratic-Republican fusion candidate Harry Heyman by a margin of 779 votes out of 4,825 cast.

The Socialists elected seven alderman to the 70-member board, and as a result most of their measures aimed at government reform, municipal ownership, and workers' rights were defeated by the Tammany majority. They were also subjected to vitriol and even threats of lynching for their opposition to the war and the Espionage Act. Vladeck, for his part, won some concessions from the board, such as free hospitalization for city workers and free lunches for poor schoolchidren. Partly under his influence, the seven Socialists broke from the party to endorse the purchase of Liberty Bonds in 1918.

Vladeck was re-elected in 1919 and in 1920 was chosen to lead the Socialists on the board. During his second term he fought for public housing and housing regulations, issues he would develop a lifelong passion for. He finally lost re-election in 1921 after the Socialist Party splintered, his district was gerrymandered, and the Republicans and Democrats fielded another fusion candidate.

=== Forward manager and Socialist functionary ===
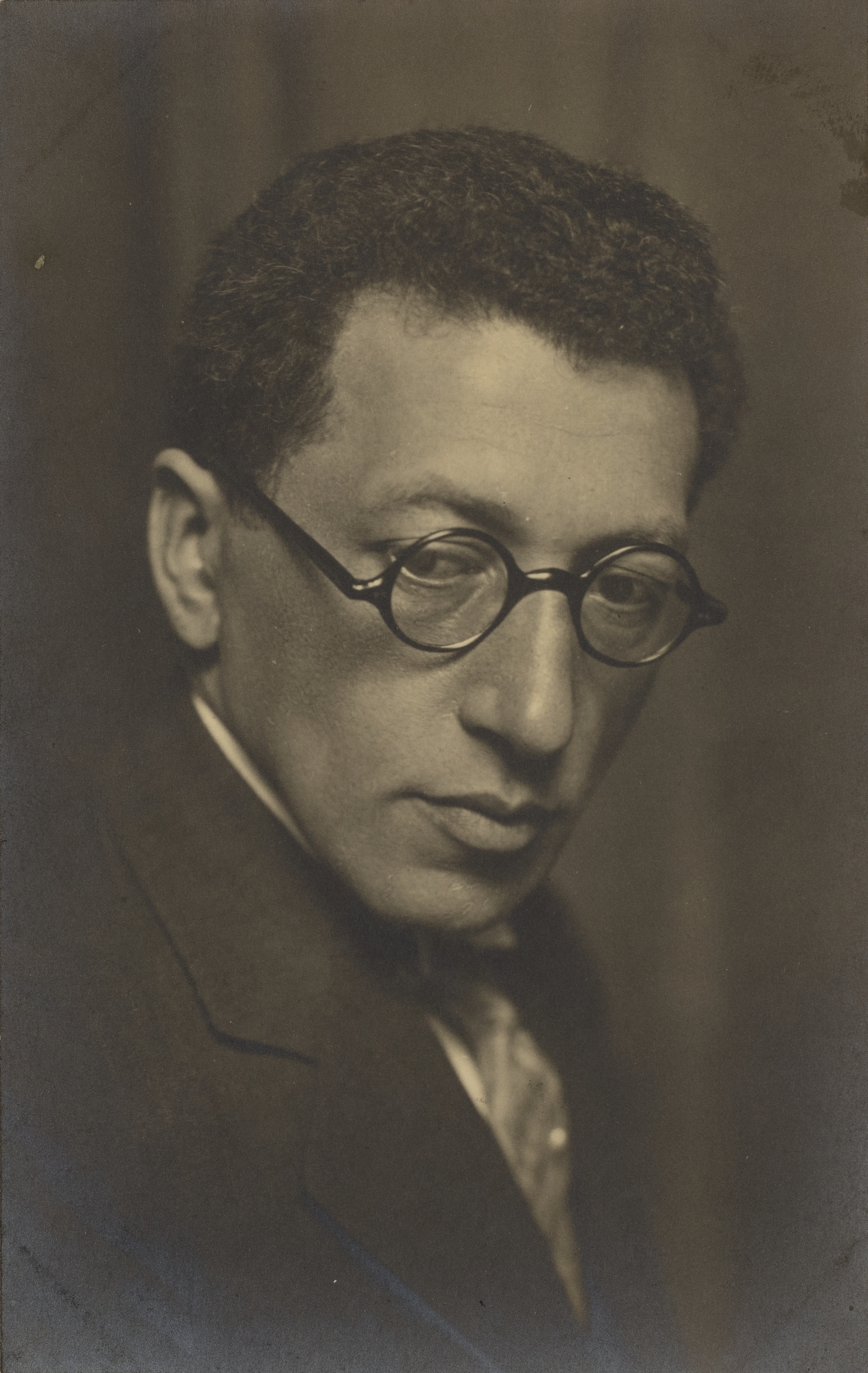
Vladeck as general manager of The Forward, 1924.

Vladeck became general manager of The Jewish Daily Forward in August 1918, charged with the organization's day-to-day operation. He would hold the position until his death twenty years later. During his tenure, he introduced a group insurance plan for all Forward employees and an English-language page to expand the paper's appeal. He also convinced the Forward Association to sponsor WEVD, a radio station set up by the Socialist Party in memoriam of its recently deceased leader Eugene V. Debs.

Despite his earlier patronage of Vladeck, Forward editor Abraham Cahan came to harbor a deep resentment towards his subordinate for reasons that were not entirely clear. Biographer Melech Epstein posits that Vladeck's poeticism clashed with Cahan's realism, and that his rapid rise in political popularity made Cahan jealous. As early as 1914 or 1915, Cahan wrote to Jacob Benjamin Salutsky, Vladeck's colleague at the Jewish Socialist Federation, claiming that Vladeck was unreliable. After Vladeck became general manager of The Forward, his increased contact with foreign correspondents and writers gave the impression to some that he, not Cahan, was the real boss of the paper, fueling Cahan's jealousy.

The situation between the two men was worsened by several ideological conflicts over the years. In 1925, Cahan traveled to Mandatory Palestine at the invitation of the Histadrut and returned a committed Zionist. Vladeck, meanwhile, had been an anti-Zionist since his days in the Bund. He met the 1917 Balfour Declaration with indifference; while he had no issue with giving Jews and Arabs equal rights in Palestine, he opposed any special status or privileges for Jews over Arabs. When Cahan began to lobby for a Jewish state, Vladeck rebuked him as follows:

Zionists and Communists have one thing in common—both are extremist fanatics to the point of madness. Like all those whose ideology is based on belief, they consider any opponent a mortal enemy. Nevertheless, let me say that not only do I not believe in the practicality of Zionism, even if it were possible to realize Zionism it would be a catastrophe. When I observe what is taking place in Lithuania, Latvia, Estonia, Romania, Poland, Bulgaria I thank God that we do not have a state of our own. A Jewish kingdom led by Jewish politicians (leaders of states are always politicians and not idealists) within a large Arab population defended by British rifles. . . . Just as I am unwilling to accept the position of the Yiddishists that the sole basis for the continued protection of Jewish identity is the Yiddish language, or the position of the Orthodox that this basis consists of the Jewish religion, so am I unwilling to accept that the only basis for the continued existence of Jewish identity is a Jewish country.

Another point of contention came with the Socialist Party's many internal conflicts. Vladeck had always been a member of the party's right wing, fighting against attempts by the Communists to hijack the party and the broader labor movement. However, at the party's 1932 convention, he joined the militants in their attempt to depose Morris Hillquit, who they saw as complacent, as national chairman of the party in favor of an "American face" (namely Milwaukee mayor Daniel Hoan, although previous presidential candidate Norman Thomas was also proposed). Hillquit would narrowly secure re-election, and Cahan, who had supported him, "virtually excommunicated" Vladeck for his role in the ordeal, although ultimately did not fire him.

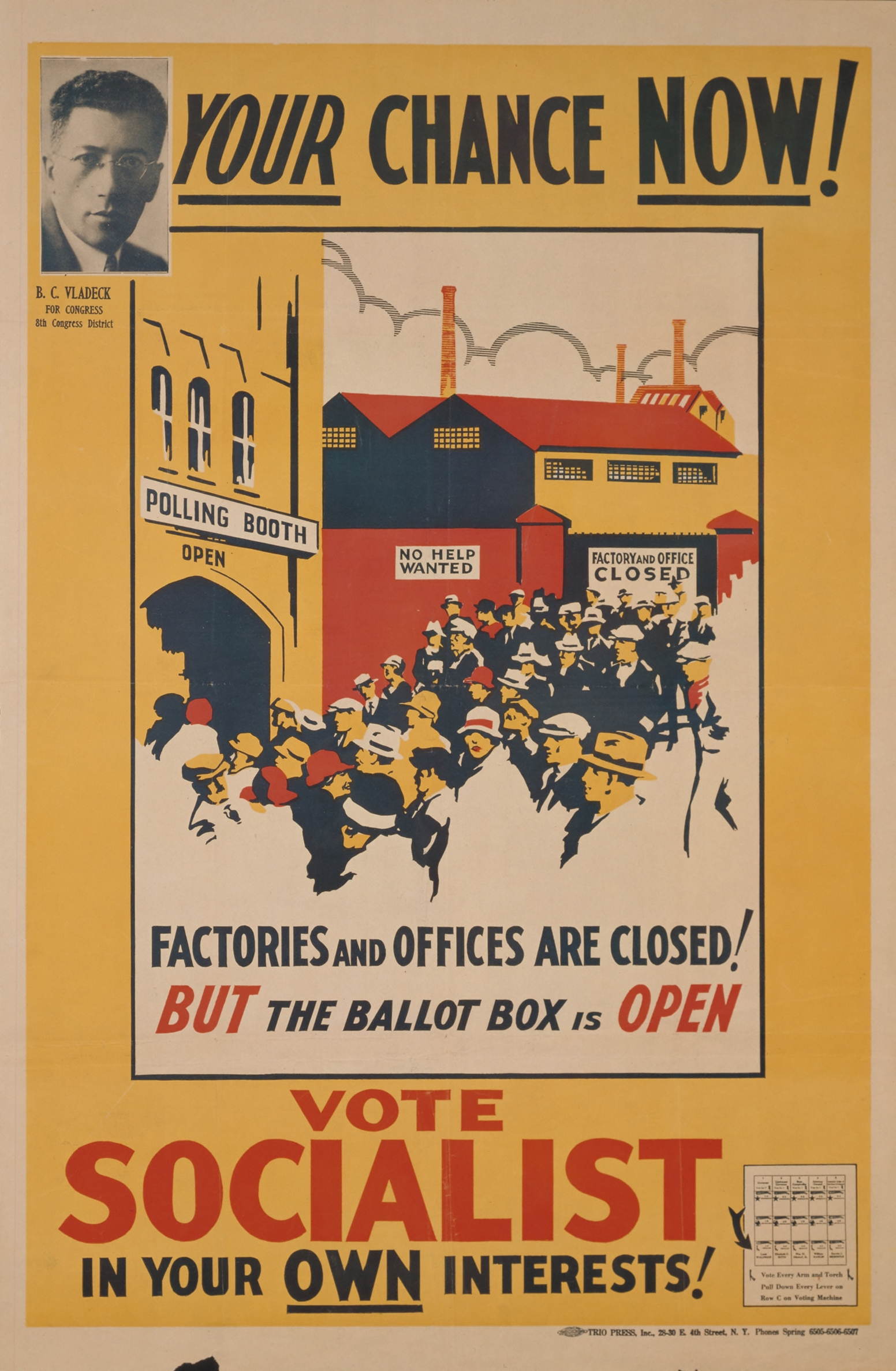
Socialist Party campaign poster featuring Vladeck as a candidate for Congress, 1930.

Vladeck returned to the electoral arena in 1930, one year into the Great Depression, with a run for Congress in New York's 8th district, covering the southern half of Brooklyn. He lost to incumbent Democrat Patrick J. Carley but polled an impressive 17 percent of the vote, giving hope to some in the party that an electoral comeback was on the horizon. Vladeck made two more Congressional runs in 1932 and 1934, as well as a run for Brooklyn Borough President in 1933, but did not match his previous success. By 1936, he had grown sick of what he perceived as Norman Thomas's divisive influence on the party, and tendered his resignation in search of a new political home.

=== Organizing the Jewish Labor Committee ===
Throughout his life Vladeck was dedicated to improving the lives of Jewish refugees around the world, and by the 1930s he had established himself as a leading humanitarian. He belonged to a number of like-minded groups, such as the Joint Distribution Committee (and one of its predecessors, the People's Relief Committee), the Hebrew Immigrant Aid Society, and the American ORT Federation (of which he served as president from 1932). He was also involved in several domestic Jewish organizations, including the Workmen's Circle, the Jewish Socialist Verband (which had split off from the Jewish Socialist Federation), the American Jewish Committee, and the Yiddish Scientific Institute. When Adolf Hitler came to power in Germany in 1933, Vladeck saw him as a threat both to Jews and labor, and resolved to use his standing to organize American resistance to the Nazi regime.

Vladeck laid the groundwork for the Jewish Labor Committee in 1933, bringing together Jewish trade unionists (especially the garment trades), socialists, and kindred groups and individuals opposed to the Nazis. Together, they successfully convinced the American Federation of Labor to support a national boycott of German goods at the federation's 1933 convention.

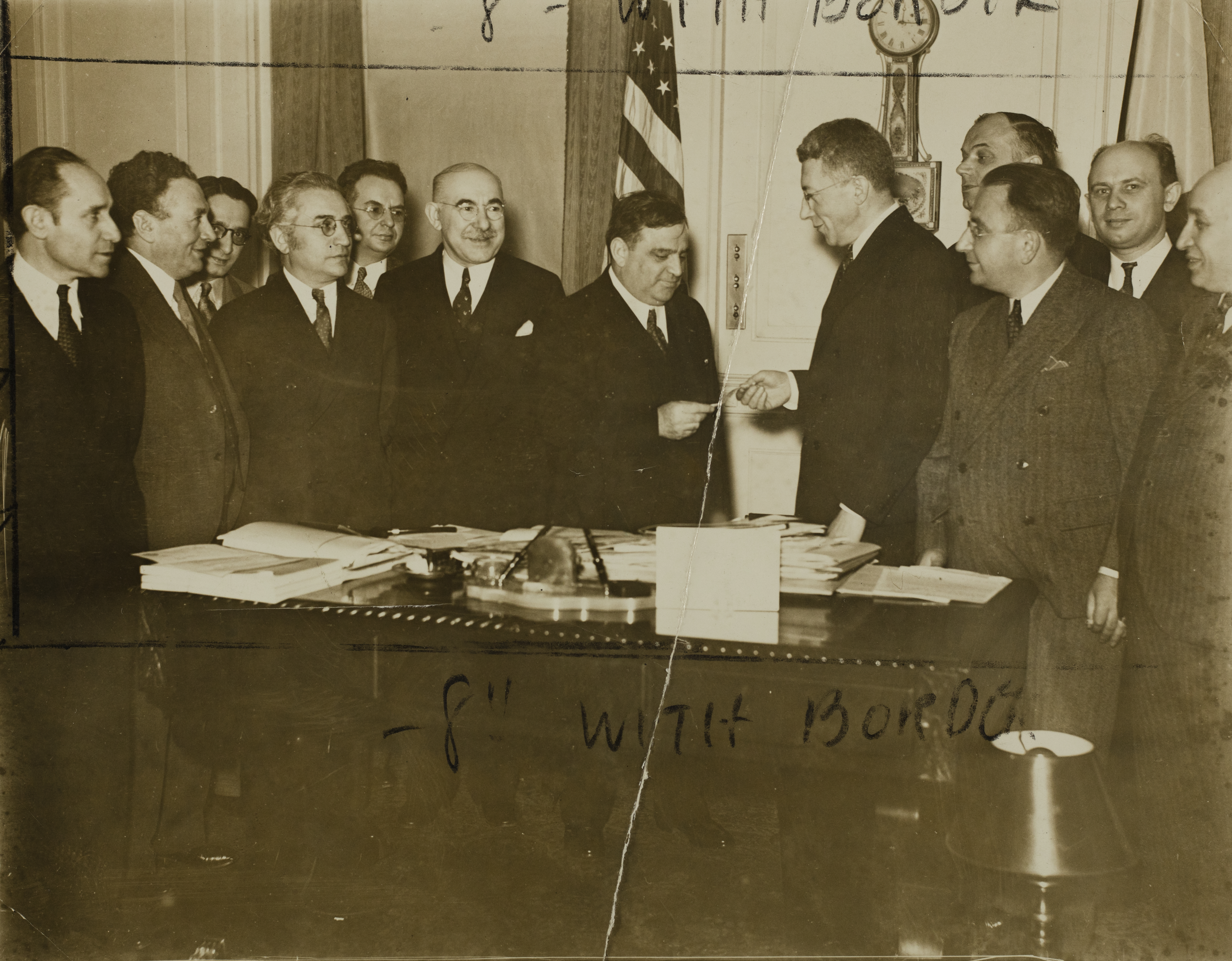
A JLC delegation, led by Vladeck, meets with New York City mayor Fiorello La Guardia c. 1938. (L-R): S. Rifkin, J. Weinberg, H. Kreuzeich, R. Guskin, I. Minkoff, M. Feinstone, Mayor La Guardia, B. C. Vladeck, Louis Hollander, Isidore Nagler, B. Gebiener, and N. Chanin

The JLC had its founding convention the following February, in New York's Lower East Side, attracting one thousand delegates representing 400,000 members; Vladeck was elected the organization's first president, serving from the convention until his death. The JLC's stated purpose was to "give aid to Jewish and non-Jewish labor institutions overseas; to assist the democratic labor movement in Europe; provide succor to victims of oppression and persecution; and to combat anti-Semitism and racial and religious intolerance abroad and in the United States."

Vladeck and the JLC returned to the AFL's 1934 convention and convinced the federation to establish the Chest for Liberation of Workers in Europe, which set aside $250,000 for assisting the labor movement in fascist countries. The JLC also raised $150,000 of their own to help labor leaders in Europe flee fascist prosecution.

=== New York City Housing Authority ===
On November 7, 1933, former Congressman Fiorello La Guardia was elected the 99th mayor of New York City, the first Republican (and first anti-Tammany) candidate to do so in 20 years. The following February, the New York City Housing Authority was established to carry out "the clearance, replanning, and reconstruction of the areas in which unsanitary or substandard housing conditions exist." Charged with appointing all five of its members, La Guardia chose Vladeck, now a housing expert and co-director of the Amalgamated Housing Cooperative, to be one of them. Their budget, secured by La Guardia from Public Works Administration head Harold Ickes, was $25 million, a fourth of the PWA's entire housing budget.

Vladeck's colleagues on the NYCHA were Tenement House Commissioner Langdon W. Post (who served as its chairman), housing advocate Louis H. Pink, social worker Mary K. Simkhovitch, and Catholic priest Edward R. Moore. It often fell to Vladeck, with his experience in such committees, to mediate disputes between the NYCHA's members. Vladeck was a champion of low-cost public housing, and by the time of his death the NYCHA had completed three such developments: the First Houses and Harlem River Houses in Manhattan, and the Williamsburg Houses in Brooklyn.

=== American Labor Party and return to elected office ===
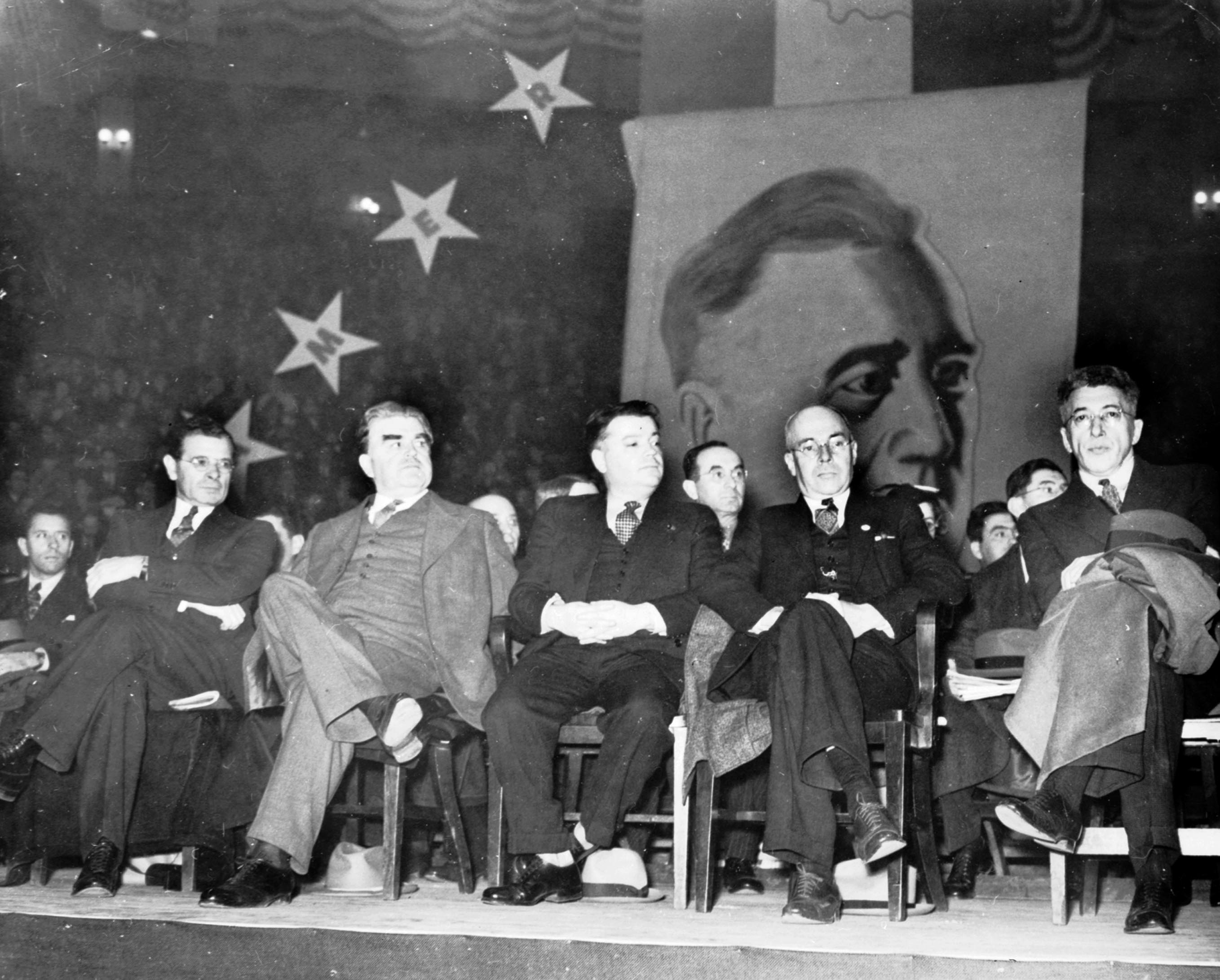
Vladeck alongside other labor leaders at an American Labor Party rally c. 1936. Seated (L-R): Sidney Hillman, John L. Lewis, David Dubinsky, unknown, and Baruch Charney Vladeck.

Even before he left the Socialist Party, Vladeck had for years been a proponent of electoral cooperation with progressives. In 1924 he (along with the rest of the party) endorsed Progressive Senator Robert M. La Follette's presidential candidacy, and a decade later he was one of the most vocal "eastern" supporters of Socialist-Progressive fusion in Wisconsin. It was no surprise then that he emerged as one of the leaders in the movement to form a pro-labor third party in the state of New York. Founded in 1936 with the purpose of securing president Franklin D. Roosevelt's re-election, the American Labor Party brought together New York's Socialist and garment trades leaders in a bid to attract pro-New Deal, anti-Tammany votes.

Although Vladeck had originally been wary of Roosevelt (he called the New Deal "half despairing capitalism, half pushcart socialism" in 1934), by 1936 he had come to admire the president and his reformist approach to politics. The same could be said for many New Yorkers; Roosevelt increased his vote share in the state by over 750,000 from 1932, nearly 275,000 of which came on the ALP ballot line. Yet even after Roosevelt's victory, Vladeck and many others saw the potential of the ALP as a permanent, independent third party, and ensured its continuation.

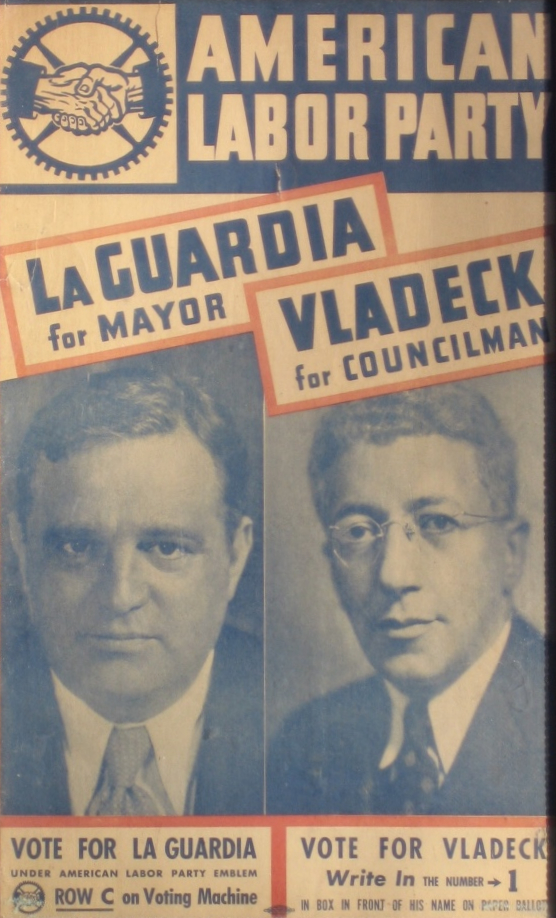
American Labor Party campaign poster featuring Vladeck and New York City mayor Fiorello La Guardia, 1937.

The party supported Fiorello La Guardia's bid for re-election in 1937 and became part of judge Samuel Seabury's Citizens Non-Partisan Committee, an anti-Tammany electoral coalition that included Republicans, American Laborites, City Fusionists, and Socialists. Elections to the newly-formed New York City Council were held the same year under a new charter approved by voters the previous year; the new Council comprised 26 members elected via proportional representation by borough, in contrast to the 65-member Board of Aldermen elected by district. Vladeck ran for City Council on the ALP ticket in Manhattan and won with the support of the entire coalition. Among those who endorsed him were mayor La Guardia, civic leader Samuel Untermyer, NYCHA chairman Langdon W. Post, city chamberlain Adolf A. Berle, reformer John Dewey, and city parks commissioner Robert Moses.

The elections resulted in La Guardia's re-election, with over 480,000 votes on the ALP line securing his victory. His coalition did well too; out of 26 council members elected, 13 were Tammany Democrats and 13 were anti-Tammany (five Laborites, three Republicans, three Fusionists, and two insurgent Democrats). Vladeck was recognized as the leader of the anti-Tammany council members, and when the City Council convened the following January he was elected its first majority leader. However, the tie between the factions meant that this did not come without a fight, and newly elected Council president Newbold Morris was ultimately forced to break the tie on Vladeck's behalf. Vladeck, Morris, and La Guardia would form a sort of "troika" that had breakfast together every morning before Council sessions to plan the legislative work of the day.

Vladeck held the office of majority leader for the next eight months, during which he developed a reputation as a calm but firm parliamentarian, only occasionally rising to challenge the bigotry of his fellow politicians. After several defections from the anti-Tammany bloc on key votes, Vladeck dissolved the coalition and resigned as majority leader on September 23, 1938, stating that the remaining members of the coalition refused to take responsibility for legislation it did not enact.

== Death and legacy ==
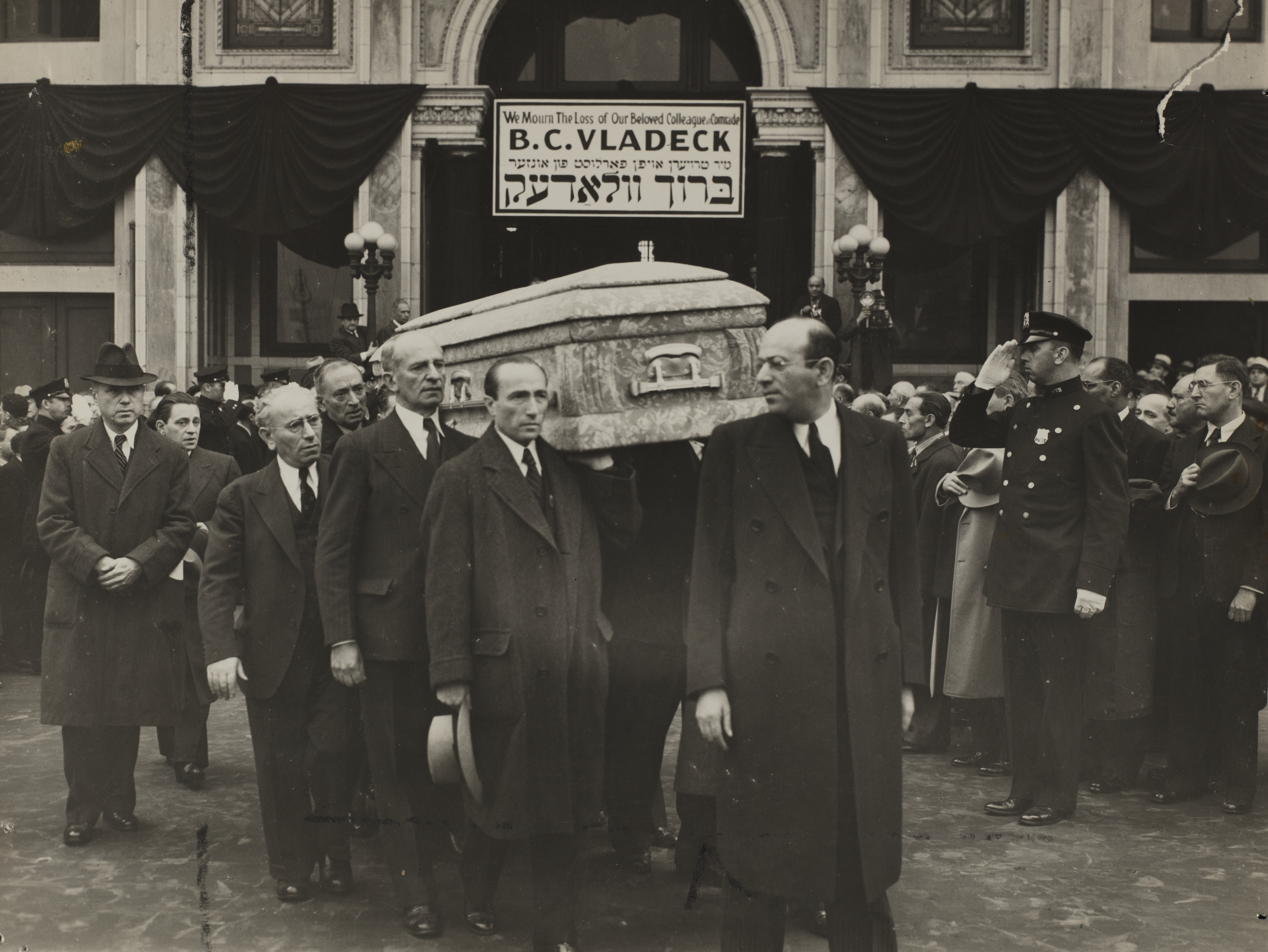
Vladeck's casket is carried out of The Jewish Daily Forward Building in Manhattan, November 2, 1938.

Vladeck died at his home in 2 Horatio Street on October 30, 1938, at the age of 52 from a coronary thrombosis. His funeral procession through the Lower East Side and ending outside the Forward building drew 500,000 mourners, New York City's second-largest funeral to date. Among the speakers at the service were Governor Herbert Lehman, Mayor Fiorello La Guardia, Senator Robert F. Wagner and Socialist leader Norman Thomas.

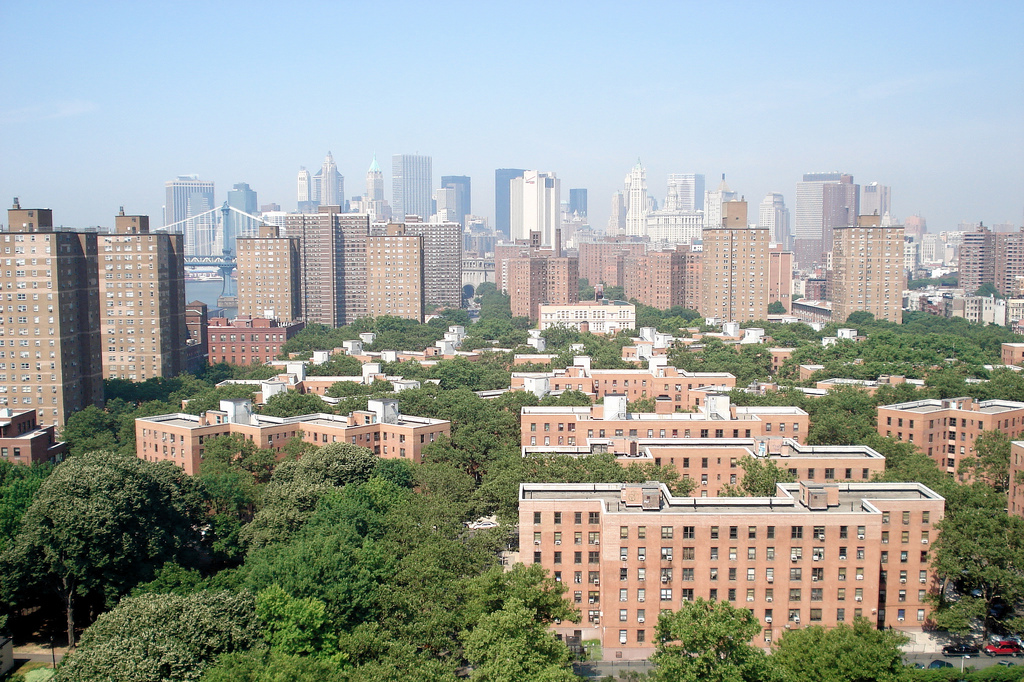
The Vladeck Houses in 2008.

Today the Vladeck Houses in Manhattan's Lower East Side, completed by the NYCHA in 1940, bear his name, as does nearby "Vladeck Park". The Amalgamated Housing Cooperative in the Bronx contains a lecture hall named Vladeck Hall. A liberty ship, B. Charney Vladeck, was named for Vladeck and launched in 1944. Vladeck's papers are housed at Tamiment Library at New York University.

One of Vladeck's sons was civil rights lawyer Stephen C. Vladeck (1920–1979) and his daughter-in-law was renowned labor lawyer Judith Vladeck. They were both active in the Liberal Party of New York, running unsuccessfully for Congress and State Assembly, respectively. Their son David served as the director of the Bureau of Consumer Protection during the Obama Administration. Another grandson of Vladeck's is singer-songwriter David Bromberg. His great-grandson is Steve Vladeck, a professor at the Georgetown University Law Center and a regular contributor to CNN.

== Works ==
=== Books ===
- פֿון דער טיעפֿעניש פֿון האַרץ: אַ בוך פֿון ליידען און קאַמפֿן (From Heart's Depth: A Book of Suffering and Struggle). Ed. with help from K. Tepper and Leon Savage. New York: Miller & Hillman, 1917.
- אין לעבען און שאַפען (In Life and Creation). Ed. Ephraim Jeshurin. New York: Forverts, 1936.

=== Articles ===
- "Against the Third International." New York: Labor Age, 1921.
- "The Largest Labor Paper in the World." New York: Labor Age, 1922.
- "Lincoln, Leader of Humanity." Cleveland: Locomotive Engineers Journal, 1923.
- "Premium Values Fade Out in Long Run." New York: The Fourth Estate, 1923.
- "Shall We Forsake European Jewry?" With other contributors. New York: The Jewish Tribune and Hebrew Standard, 1924.
- "The Rallying Point of Our Movement." New York: The New Leader, 1925.
- "Not Much to Be Proud Of." New York: The New Leader, 1925.
- "Leading Jewish Writers of Europe and America Debate the Palestine Question." With other contributors. New York: Forverts, 1926.
- "A Voice In The Wilderness Or A Bugle Call?" New York: The New Leader, 1927.
- "Largest Industries are Challenge to A. F. of L." New York: Labor Age, 1930.
- "Milwaukee and Socialism." New York: The World Tomorrow, 1931.
- "The Architect in the Body Social." New York: The Professional Architectural Monthly, 1934.
- "The Architect and His Job." Washington, D.C.: Architecture: The AIA Journal, 1935.
- "World Labor Backs Sanctions As 51 Nations Begin Action." New York: The New Leader, 1935.
- "Travel Notes of an Amateur Houser." New York: The Professional Architectural Monthly, 1936.

=== Reviews ===
- "A Gift to America." New York: The Nation, 1923.
- "The Rebel Jews." New York: The New Leader, 1926.
- "Five Friendly Studies of Russia." New York: The New Leader, 1928.
- "The Complete Cycle of a Life." New York: The Bookman, 1928.
- "Americans and Russia." New York: The Bookman, 1929.

=== Plays ===
- משה רבינו (Our Lord Moses). New York: Di Tsukunft, 1920.

== Sources ==
- Epstein, Melech (1965). Profiles of Eleven. Detroit: Wayne State University Press.
- Johnpoll, Bernard; Klehr, Harvey (1986). Biographical Dictionary of the American Left. Westport: Greenwood Press. ISBN 0313242003.

Trade union offices
| Preceded by Committee founded | President of the Jewish Labor Committee; 1934–1937 | Succeeded by Adolph Held |
