= Charles S. Zimmerman =

American socialist activist

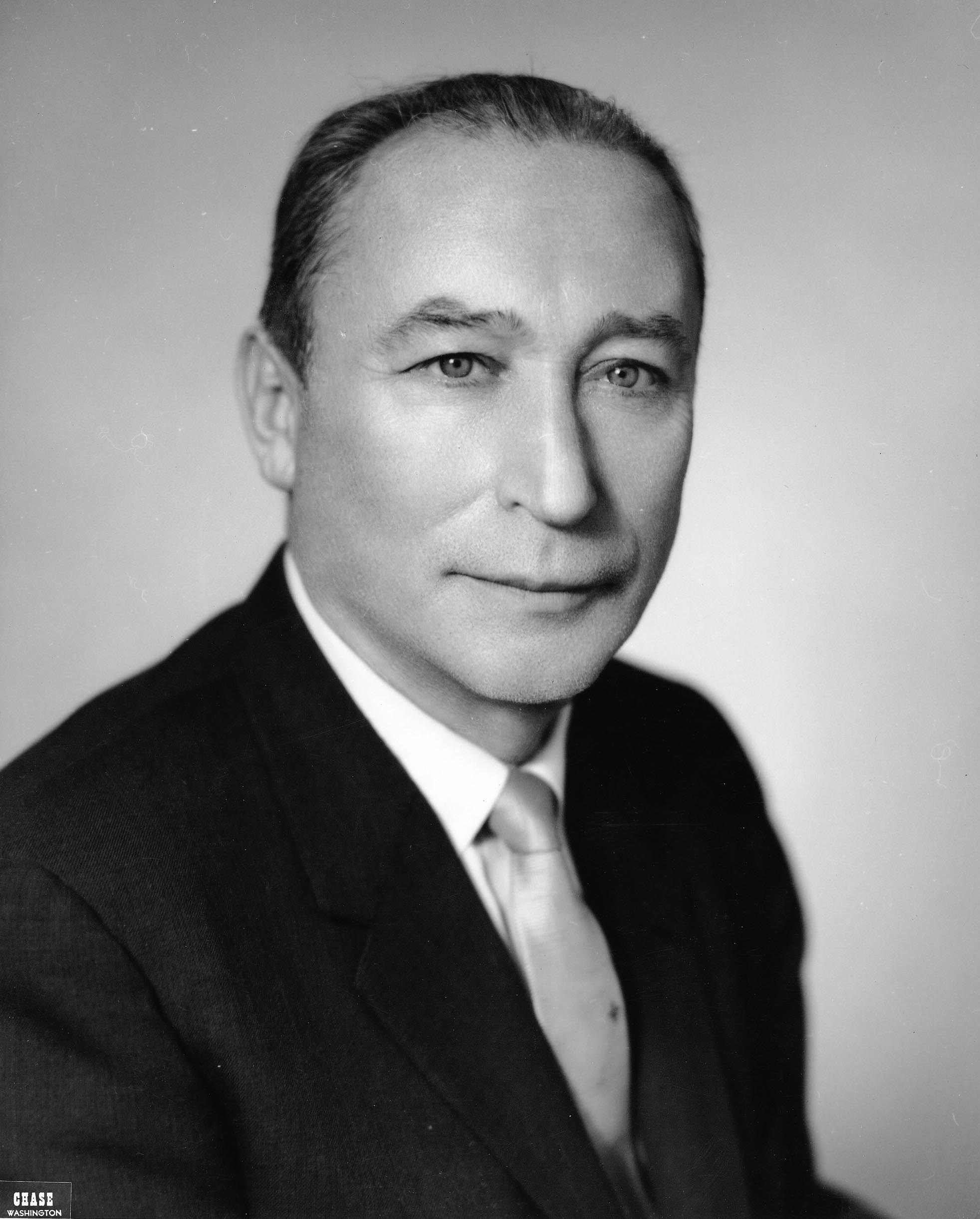
- Zimmerman c. 1950s

President of the Jewish Labor Committee
- In office May 14, 1969 – c. April 1974
- Preceded by: Adolph Held
- Succeeded by: Jack Sheinkman

Vice President of the International Ladies Garment Workers Union
- In office June 9, 1934 – 1972
- President: David Dubinsky; Louis Stulberg
- Preceded by: Multi-member position
- Succeeded by: Multi-member position

Personal details
- Born: November 27, 1897 Talne, Podolia Governorate, Russian Empire
- Died: June 3, 1983 (aged 86) New York City, New York, U.S.
- Party: Socialist (1917–1919); Communist (1919–1929); Communist (Lovestoneites) (1929–1936); American Labor (1936–1944); Liberal (1944–1972); Social Democrats, USA (after 1972)
- Other political affiliations: Workers (1921–1929)
- Spouse: Rose Prepstein
- Children: Paul
- Occupation: Labor leader
- Nickname: "Sasha"

Charles S. "Sasha" Zimmerman (November 27, 1897 – June 3, 1983) was a Ukrainian-American socialist activist and trade union leader, who was an associate of Jay Lovestone. Zimmerman had a career spanning five decades as an official of the International Ladies Garment Workers Union. During the early 1970s, Zimmerman and Bayard Rustin were national Co-Chairmen the Socialist Party of America and the Social Democrats USA.

== Biography ==
=== Early years ===
Charles S. Zimmerman was born of Jewish parents as Alexander Ubsushone in 1896. Alexander, known to family and friends as "Sasha," was born in the Ukrainian shtetl of Talne, then part of the Russian Empire. Sasha's father died when he was 7 and his widowed mother opened up a small grocery store and candy shop to support Sasha, his two siblings, and her mother. Sasha was raised in large measure by his grandmother, an Orthodox Jew.

Sasha attended Talmud Torah for three years and had two years of Russian schooling, gaining admission to the Russian gymnasium, which already had its quota of Jewish students, only after a battle made with the assistance of a local doctor.

At the age of 12, Sasha began transcribing communiques to help a young man he knew who was connected with the revolutionary movement in Odessa and Kiev.

Zimmerman later recalled:

Apparently he didn't want his handwriting to be on it... I asked him questions... [He replied that] when you will grow up, you'll understand. But whether I understood or not, it was bound to leave some impression. There was the revolutionary movement in town ... and the kids knew all about it, and there were meetings.

All these things had an effect... At the age of eleven and twelve you were no longer a child.

Sasha emigrated to the United States in 1913 at the age of 16, where he joined a sister in living with an uncle in New York City. It has been alleged that Sasha had his name changed to Charles Sasha Zimmerman by an official at Ellis Island upon arrival and he was thereafter known by this new moniker but this is impossible because Ellis Island officials never changed people's names.

Zimmerman first went to work as a retail clerk in a store near his apartment, but the hours of employment made it impossible for the boy to attend night school. Charles quit and took a job in the burgeoning New York garment industry making knee-pants, a position which allowed him to continue his studies in the evening. Pay for the immigrant workers was low and conditions poor in the New York sweatshops. Within a year, the young Zimmerman had helped to form a union local and had led a three-week strike of his fellows for better wages.

In 1914, Zimmerman found himself laid off his job. He was taken to work by his uncle, a factory foreman in Astoria, where he was taught carpentry, a job which netted him just $5.80 per week after car fare was paid. After less than a year, Zimmerman again found himself unemployed, and he returned to work in the garment industry, working in a factory in New Jersey.

=== Political career ===
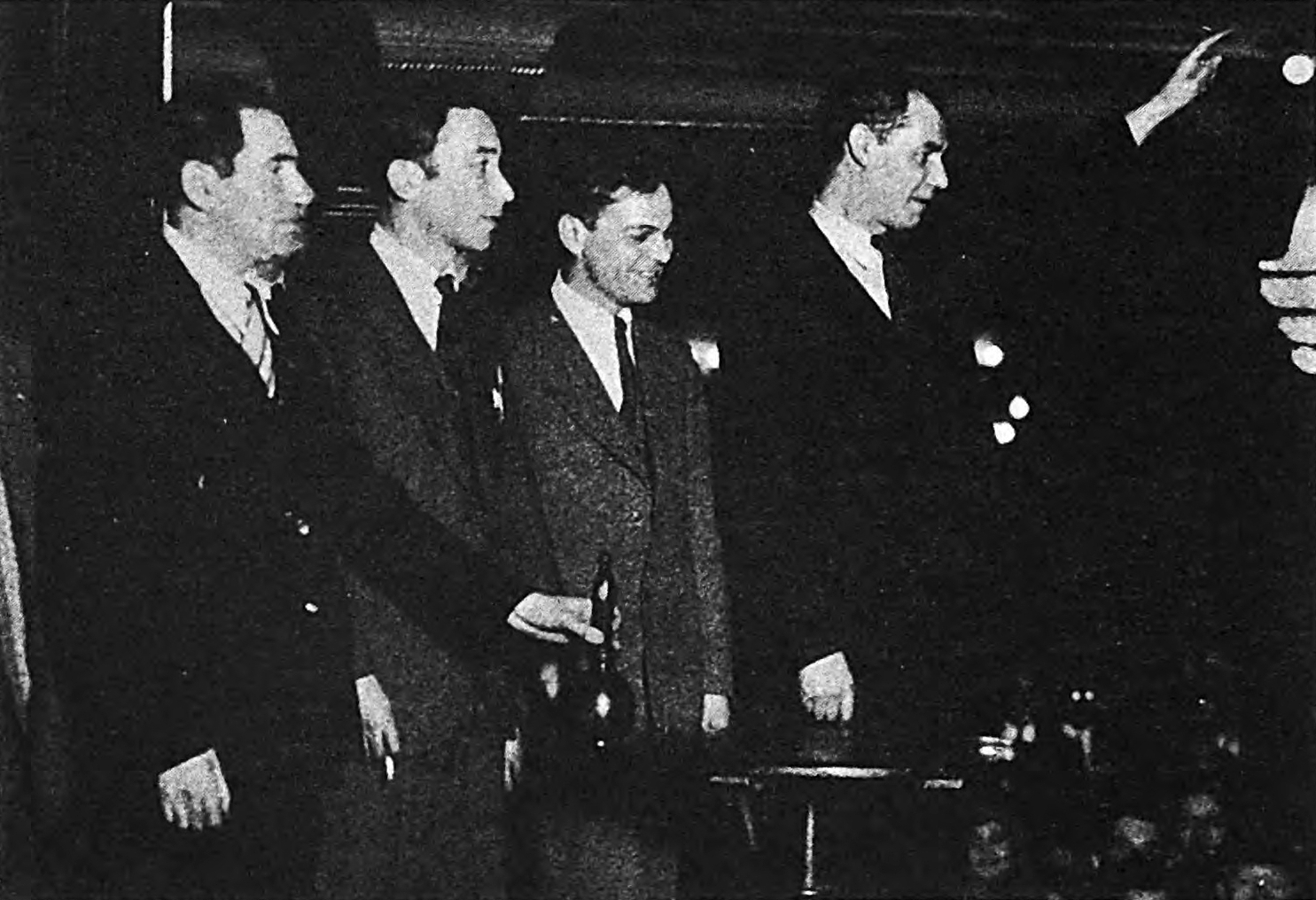
Leaders of the Needle Trades Workers Industrial Union address striking workers c. 1929. Left to right: P. Goodman, Sascha Zimmerman, Ben Gold, and Louis Hyman.

In 1916, Zimmerman joined the International Ladies' Garment Workers' Union (ILGWU), and was elected chairman of his shop within a few weeks. The next year, he joined the Socialist Party of America (SPA). He remained active in the radical labor movement for the rest of his life.

Zimmerman joined the Communist Party of America (CPA) at the time of its formation in 1919. In the CPA, Zimmerman was a close associate of Jay Lovestone, who emerged as Executive Secretary of the organization after the sudden death of C.E. Ruthenberg in 1927.

From 1923 until 1958, except for one interlude, Zimmerman was prominent in the powerful Local 22 of the ILGWU in New York. Zimmerman was stripped of his position due to his Communist political affiliation in 1925.

During the period in which he was excluded from the ILGWU, Zimmerman was influential in establishing the Needle Trades Workers Industrial Union, a dual union sponsored by the Communist Party's Trade Union Unity League (TUUL) and affiliated with the Red International of Labor Unions (RILU). Zimmerman's expulsion from the Communist Party in 1929 led to his expulsion from the NTWIU in 1930, paving his way for a return to ILGWU Local 22 shortly thereafter.

Zimmerman was three times a candidate for elective political office, running in Bronx County for New York State Assembly in 1925, 1926, and 1928 on the ticket of the Workers (Communist) Party.

Zimmerman was in Moscow on party business in association with RILU in May 1929 at the time of the decisive showdown between Lovestone and his associates with the Communist International. The Comintern's was at the time attempting to solve the unceasing and bitter factional war in the American Communist Party by equalizing factional strength in the party leadership and reassigning factional leaders Lovestone and Alexander Bittelman to Comintern work abroad, decisions which the Lovestone majority group deeply resented. Zimmerman soon found himself expelled from the organization along with Lovestone and most of the others in his circle for their defiance of the Comintern's instructions.

Zimmerman joined with Lovestone in establishing the Communist Party (Majority Group), an organization which underwent a series of name changes before eventually emerging as the Independent Labor League of America in the late 1930s. He was among the initial members of the governing National Council of the CPMG.

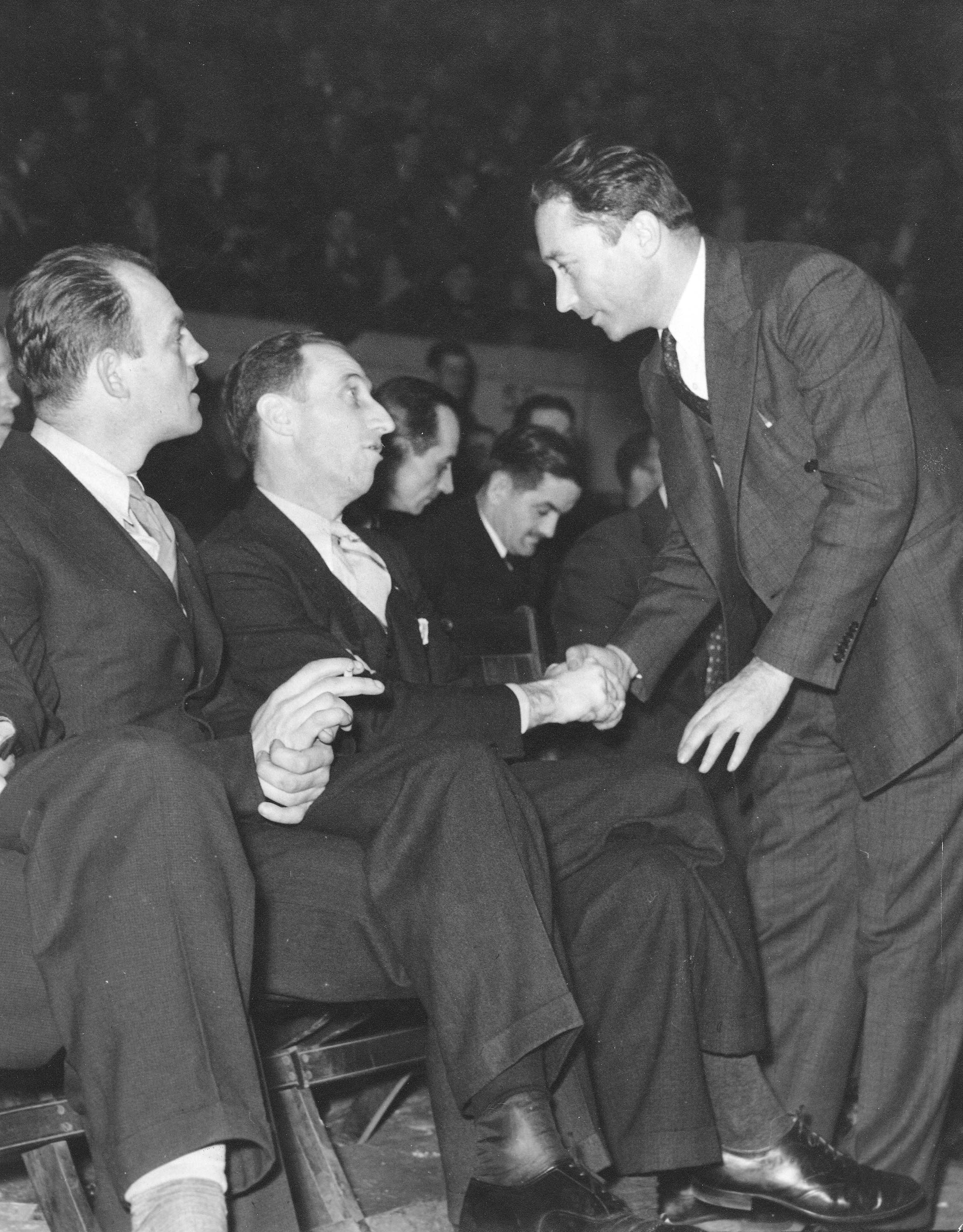
Zimmerman shaking hands with fellow "Red" labor leader Harry Bridges c. 1930s

In 1933, Zimmerman was asked by the retiring manager of Local 22 to run for his post. The election was held on April 6, 1933, with Zimmerman elected manager by a narrow margin, receiving 396 votes out of 825 cast in a three-way race. Zimmerman remained in this position heading Local 22 of the ILGWU for the next 40 years, retiring only in the early 1970s.

In 1934, Zimmerman was elected as a national vice-president of the ILGWU. His election to such a prestigious position did not necessarily follow that Zimmerman had left his radical political orientation behind, however. Zimmerman was a bitter critic of the National Recovery Act of President Franklin D. Roosevelt in the period, regarding it in particular and the New Deal in general as "a Fascist idea," and he was outspoken in holding the view, saying as much to a convention of the ILGWU.

In the middle 1930s, with the ultra-radical "Third Period" at an end in favor of the coalition-building of the "Popular Front," the official Communists were persuaded to drop their dual union activities and to rejoin the ILGWU. Communist Party loyalists contested the "Lovestoneite" Zimmerman's leadership of Local 22 for a number of years, without success.

Local 22 criticizing Dubinsky and Zimmerman

As a national leader of the ILGWU, Zimmerman proved a loyal supporter of union head David Dubinsky, supporting the affiliation of the union to the Congress of Industrial Organizations in 1935 and backing Dubinsky's decision to withdraw from the CIO in 1938 in order to return to the American Federation of Labor (AFL), a decision made in the face of particularly bitter opposition from official Communists in the union.

During the years of the Spanish Civil War, Zimmerman led a trade union campaign to aid the Spanish workers and civilian populations in Spain who suffered under shortages of food, clothing, and medicine. The initial impulse for this fund-raising work was an appeal that came to Dubinsky and the ILGWU from secretary general Walter Schevenels and president Walter M. Citrine of the International Federation of Trade Unions, which had established a Labor Solidarity Fund for the relief work. In response the ILGWU took the lead in founding the Trade Union Red Cross for Spain, with Zimmerman as chairman, Dubinsky as treasurer, and Alex Rose, of the Hat, Cap, and Millinery Workers Union, as secretary. Promoting the humanitarian effort as support to Spanish labor in the fight against fascism, the union leaders raised $125,000 by May 1937. The relief organization was later renamed Trade Union Relief for Spain, and remained in existence through early 1939.

By the end of the 1930s, Zimmerman had come over to lending the Roosevelt Administration and its New Deal policies his full sympathy and support. In January 1939 he sent a telegram to William Green, president of the American Federation of Labor, accusing "conservative forces in Congress" of "organizing to prevent enactment of new social legislation" and of acting "to worsen the unemployment situation by cutting down WPA appropriations." Zimmerman called for a national conference bringing together representatives of the AFL, the CIO, and the railway brotherhoods as a means of establishing "united labor action" to defend the Rooseveltian policies.

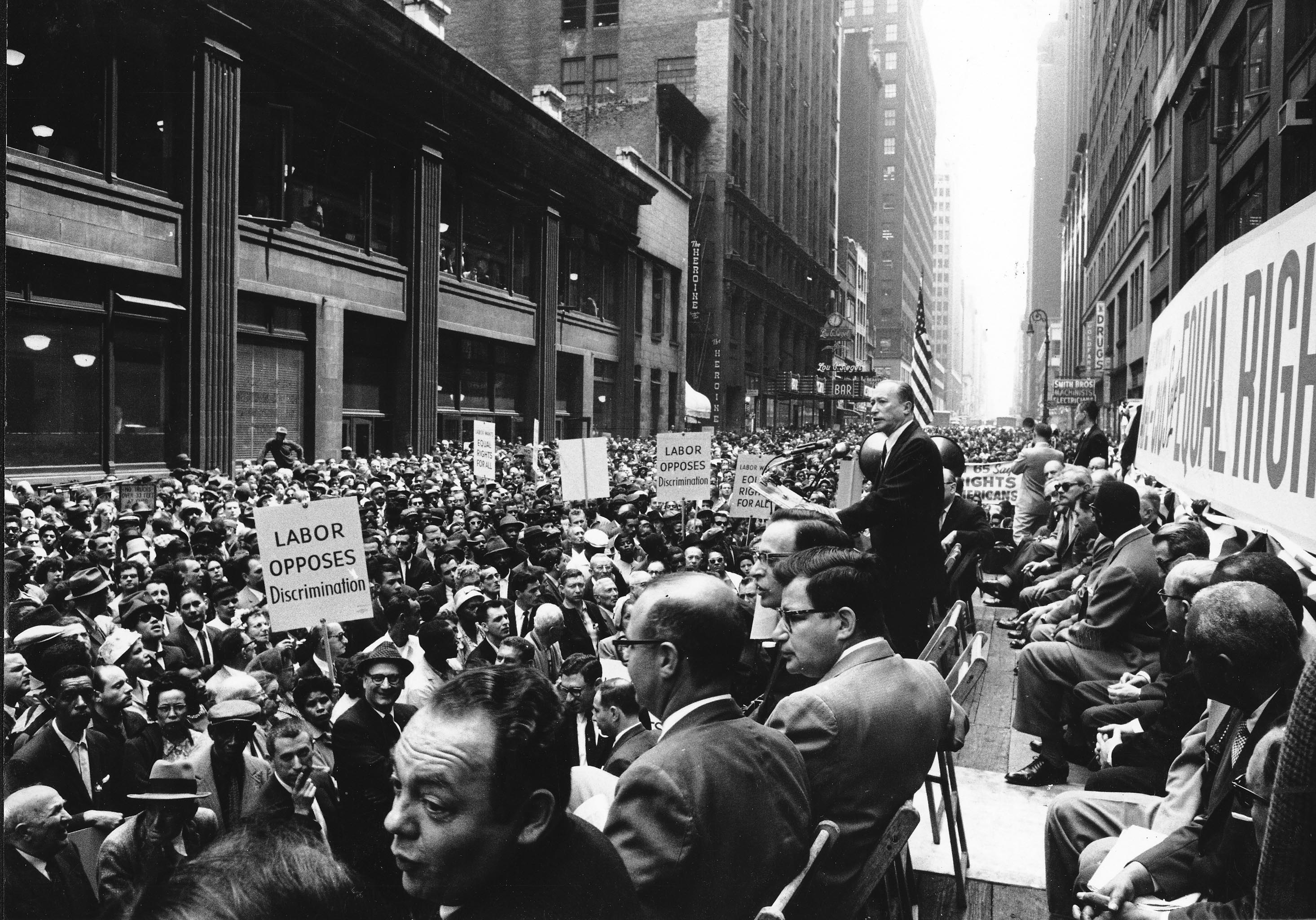
Zimmerman speaks at a civil rights rally in New York City, May 17, 1960

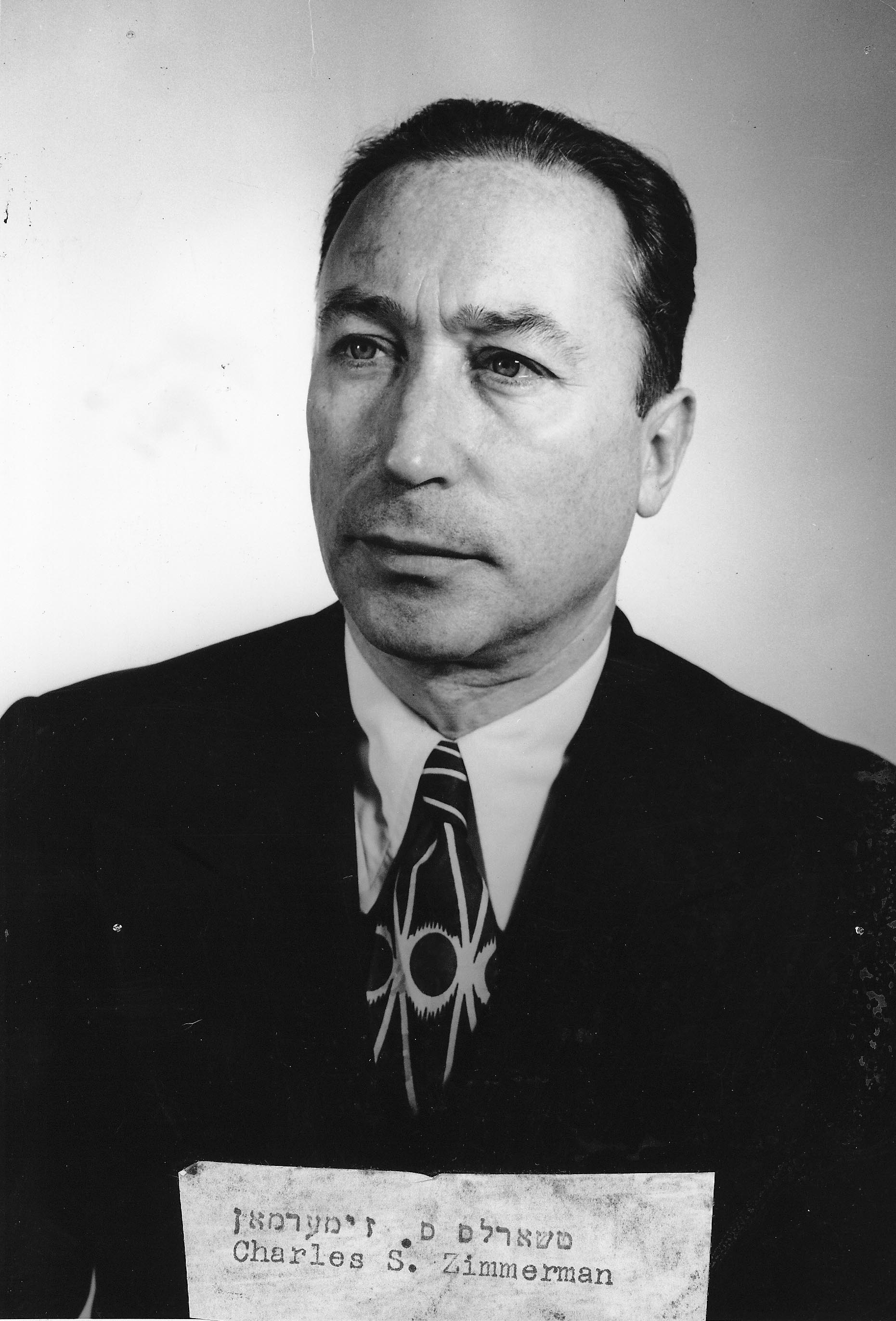
Zimmerman c. 1940s

Along with his political allies David Dubinsky and Jay Lovestone, Zimmerman emerged as a prominent anti-communist "Cold War liberal" in the years after the conclusion of World War II. Early in 1946, Zimmerman was dispatched to Europe on behalf of the Jewish Labor Committee to make a survey of the political situation on the ground there. Zimmerman made his report on his trip in April 1946, detailing his perspective on Scandinavia, France, Poland, and Germany. Zimmerman was particularly concerned that in the zone of divided Germany controlled by the Soviet Union, Communist unionists were receiving five times the amount of newsprint allotted to the Socialists, thus making them far better able to advance their views.

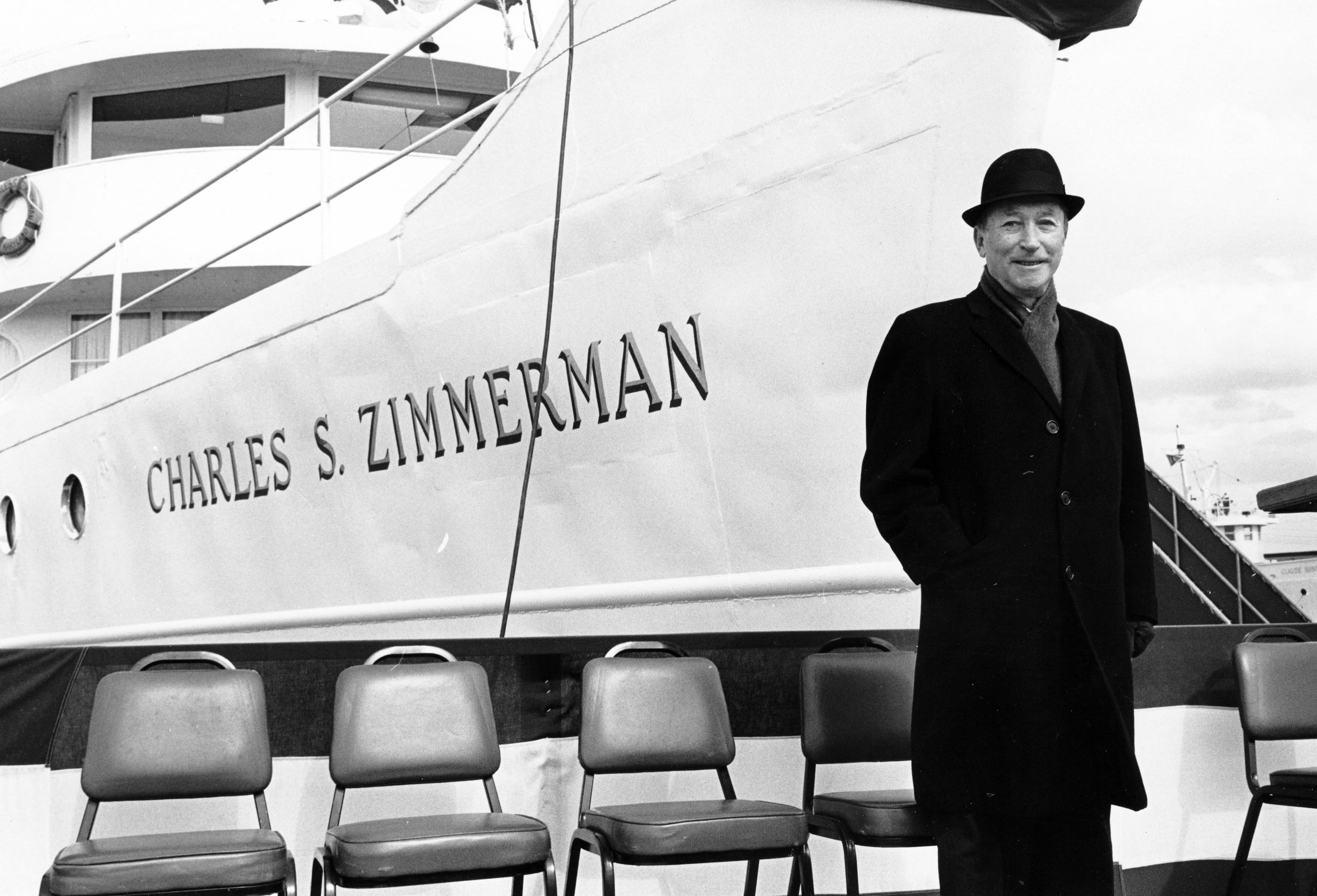
Zimmerman at the christening of the "Charles S. Zimmerman," March 11, 1969

In 1958, Zimmerman became the head of the Dress Waistmakers Union. He also served as chairman of the Civil Rights Committee of the AFL–CIO.

=== Death and legacy ===
Charles S. Zimmerman suffered a stroke in 1966, which blinded him but did not remove him from active political activity. In 1972, he and Bayard Rustin were elected co-chairman of the Socialist Party-Democratic Socialist Federation, and supported changing its name to Social Democrats, USA.

After his retirement from union work in 1972, Zimmerman continued to live in New York City. He died on June 3, 1983, at the age of 86. Zimmerman's son Paul was the famed football writer for the weekly magazine Sports Illustrated. Zimmerman's papers are housed at Cornell University in Ithaca, New York.

== Publications ==
- American labor faces the future; the problems of trade unionism in the light of the San Francisco general strike. New York, Dressmakers union local 22, I.L.G.W.U. 1934
- The labor movement and the NRA: the standpoint of progressive unionism. New York, Dressmakers union local 22, I.L.G.W.U. 1934
- Our Union at work; Summary report of the executive board of Dressmakers Union, Local 22, I.L.G.W.U., for the year April 1933 to April 1934 New York, Dressmakers union local 22, I.L.G.W.U. 1934
- Report on the medical administration of sick benefits to Dressmakers' Union Local 22 of the International Ladies' Garment Workers' Union for the year 1935. New York, Dressmakers union local 22, I.L.G.W.U. 1936
- Probable effect of the war on the New York women's garment industry and some recommendations: report by a special committee of the International Ladies' Garment Workers' Union. New York: Jewish Labor Committee 1942
- In freedom 's cause. Report Antidiscrimination department Jewish Labor Committee [of the] 1957 Biennial Convention, Atlantic City, N.J. New York: Jewish Labor Committee 1957

Trade union offices
Preceded by Adolph Held	President of the Jewish Labor Committee; 1969–1974	Succeeded by Jack Sheinkman
