= Shmuel Niger =

Yiddish literary critic (1883–1955)

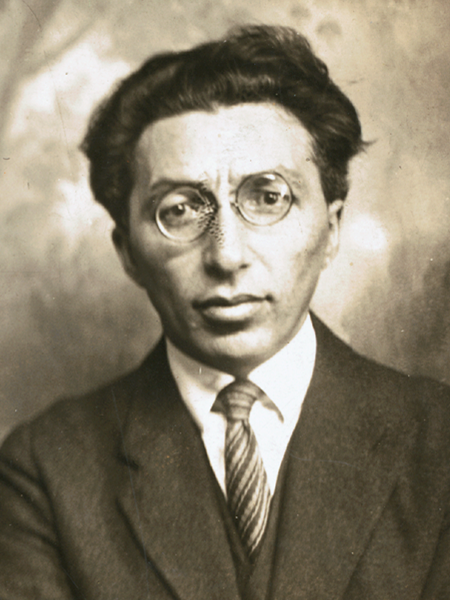
- Niger c. 1920s
- Born: Shmuel Charney; 15 June 1883; Dukora, Minsk Governorate, Russian Empire
- Died: December 24, 1955 (aged 72); New York City, New York, US
- Other names: Samuel Niger, Samuel Charney, Shmuel Ṭsharni
- Occupation: Yiddish literary critic
- Children: 2; Elizabeth Shub
- Relatives: Baruch Charney Vladeck (brother); Daniel Charney (brother); David Shub (son-in-law)

Shmuel Niger (also Samuel Niger; pen name of Shmuel Charney, 1883–1955, Yiddish: שמואל טשאַרני) was a Yiddish writer, literary critic and historian and was one of the leading figures of Yiddish cultural work and Yiddishism in pre-revolution Russia.

== Life ==
Shmuel Niger was born Shmuel Ṭsharni on 15 June 1883 in Dukora, a small village in Minsk Governorate, to Zev Volf and Brokhe Tsharni (née Hurwitz). His father, a fervent Lubavitcher Hasid, died in 1889, leaving Shmuel's mother a widow with five sons (he being the third) and a daughter. Niger's two younger brothers also achieved renown. Baruch Charney Vladeck (1886–1938) became a leading socialist agitator and theoretician, general manager of The Jewish Daily Forward and New York City alderman while Daniel Charney (1888–1959) was a celebrated Yiddish poet, writer and journalist.

Niger was a child prodigy, studying Talmud until the age of 17 at yeshivas in Berezin and Minsk. He was preparing for rabbinic ordination when he instead moved into the secular and political world, having become attracted to secular culture and Zionism. In 1904, he co-founded the Zionist Socialist Workers Party, and was a writer for the party paper Der nayer veg (The New Path). He was imprisoned and tortured for his political activity several times in Minsk, Kiev, Warsaw, Daugavpils (Dvinsk), Odessa, and Vilna, but he avoided execution after the intervention of family and friends.

== Literary career ==
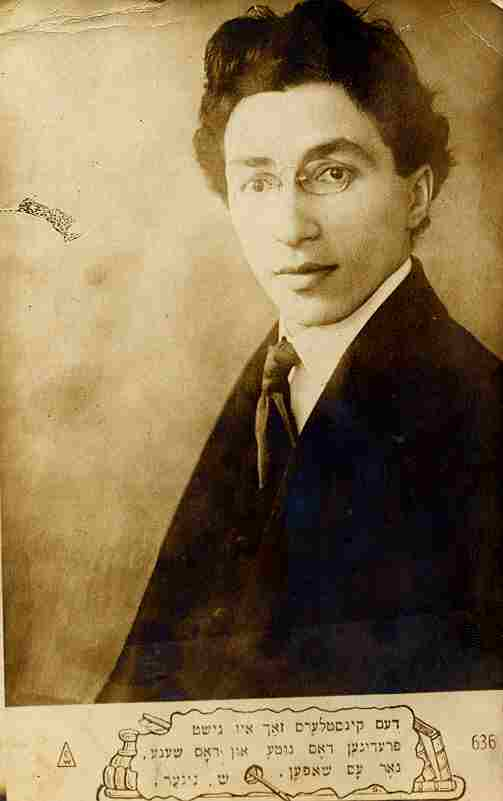
Niger c. 1910s

After initial literary forays in Russian and Hebrew, he wrote, published and worked as an editor for many different Yiddish periodicals in Vilna, St. Petersburg and Moscow. His 1907 essay on Sholem Asch's drama Meshiekhs tsaytn (The Age of the Messiah) was his first significant Yiddish critical article and also helped to introduce the still relatively unknown Asch to a much broader audience. In 1908, together with the Bundist dramatist A. Vayter and the Zionist essayist S. Gorelik, he founded the short-lived journal Literarishe Monatshriftn (Literary Monthly Journal) in Vilna, which is widely credited with having launched the Yiddish literary renaissance. The journal, while only publishing four issues, contained works of the bright young hopefuls of Yiddish literature, including Sholem Asch, Dovid Einhorn, Peretz Hirshbein, Hersh Dovid Nomberg, and Der Nister. Niger's own essays on Asch, Nomberg, I. L. Peretz, and Avrom Reyzen set the high literary tone of the journal and heralded a level of literary and critical sophistication unprecedented in Yiddish literature.

Assisted by Ber Borochov, he edited Der Pinkes (The Record Book, 1913), the first Yiddish scholarly volume devoted to the study of Yiddish literature, language, folklore, criticism, and bibliography. He also edited Zalman Reisen's Leksikon fun der Yidisher Literatur un Prese (Lexicon of Yiddish Literature and Press, 1914). These volumes helped to lay the foundation for the scholarly study of the Yiddish language and literature.

== In America ==
In autumn 1919, Niger immigrated to the United States, where at first he worked at The Jewish Daily Forward (where his brother Baruch was manager), and a few weeks later at the Yiddish liberal daily Tog (Day), for which he worked until his death in 1955. He became the leading critic of Yiddish literary life, writing weekly reviews of books and articles on literary trends for Tog. He also co-edited the literary monthly Di Tsukunft from 1941 to 1947. Although the bulk of Niger's literary criticism, mainly consisting of articles and essays from journals and newspapers, was never collected and published in book form, a bibliography compiled by Efim Jeshurin lists 4,083 items by Niger and 1,607 items about him.

Niger died in New York City on 24 December 1955, returning from a YIVO Executive Committee meeting. His funeral was attended by well over 1,000 people and news of his death led to the publication in the Jewish press of hundreds of articles about him worldwide. He was buried at Mount Carmel Cemetery in Queens, New York.
