= Socialist Party of New York =

Political parties in New York, United States

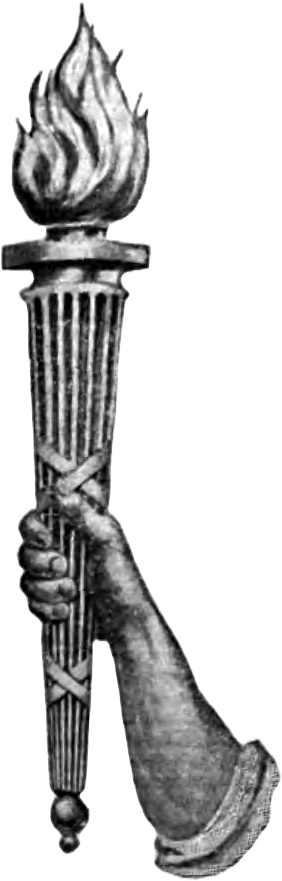
- The Arm and Torch, first designed by Joseph A. Weil, as it appeared in a 1908 publication
- Senate leader: None
- House leader: None
- Founded: c. 1899 (SDP affiliate) c. 1901 (SPA affiliate); 1973 (SPUSA affiliate)
- Headquarters: 339 Lafayette St., New York City, New York
- Ideology: Democratic socialism
- Political position: Left-wing
- National affiliation: Socialist Party USA
- Colors: Red

Website
- Wayback Machine

The Socialist Party of New York is the name of two distinct, but historically related state affiliates of the American socialist movement located in New York state. Emerging from a July 1899 split in the Socialist Labor Party of America, the organization existed first as the Social Democratic Party of New York, retaining that name even after the founding of the Socialist Party of America (SPA) in the summer of 1901. A presence was maintained in the state as the Socialist Party of New York for the next seven decades.

The SPNY is currently the state chapter of the Socialist Party USA (SPUSA), an organization which emerged from the ashes of the old SPA in 1973.

== Socialist Party of America and antecedents (1890s-1972) ==
=== Forerunners ===
The Socialist Labor Party of America (SLP) throughout its first fifteen years was primarily an organization of German immigrants. Organized in 1876, the party included sections from New York City and its environs from its date of origin.

By the decade of the 1890s the National Executive Committee of the SLP was based in New York, which was also the place of publication of the organization's official organs, including the English-language weekly, The People, and the German-language Vorwärts (Forward).

A bitter dispute over trade union policy led to a split of the SLP in July 1899, with a dissident faction (disparagingly known as the “Kangaroos”) headed by lawyers Henry L. Slobodin and Morris Hillquit. Fighting for control of the National Executive Committee and losing, a majority of the party's membership departed to launch a new organization — also confusingly known as the Socialist Labor Party and issuing an English-language weekly which made use of the same front page nameplate as that of its orthodox rivals.

=== 1900 convention ===
On Saturday, June 16, 1900, a joint convention was held in New York City bringing together delegates from the dissident SLP and the Chicago SDP. A nine-member State Committee was elected that included, among others, German editor Herman Schlueter, Leonard D. Abbott, and future National Secretary of the Springfield SDP William Butscher.

For a number of years after the formation of the Socialist Party of America in the summer of 1901, the New York state affiliate of that organization retained its prior name, the Social Democratic Party of New York, owing to provisions of New York election law that made a renaming of the party without loss of its ballot line problematic. The party also retained the former ballot logo of the Social Democratic Party with headquarters in Springfield, an upraised arm bearing a torch.

=== Growth ===
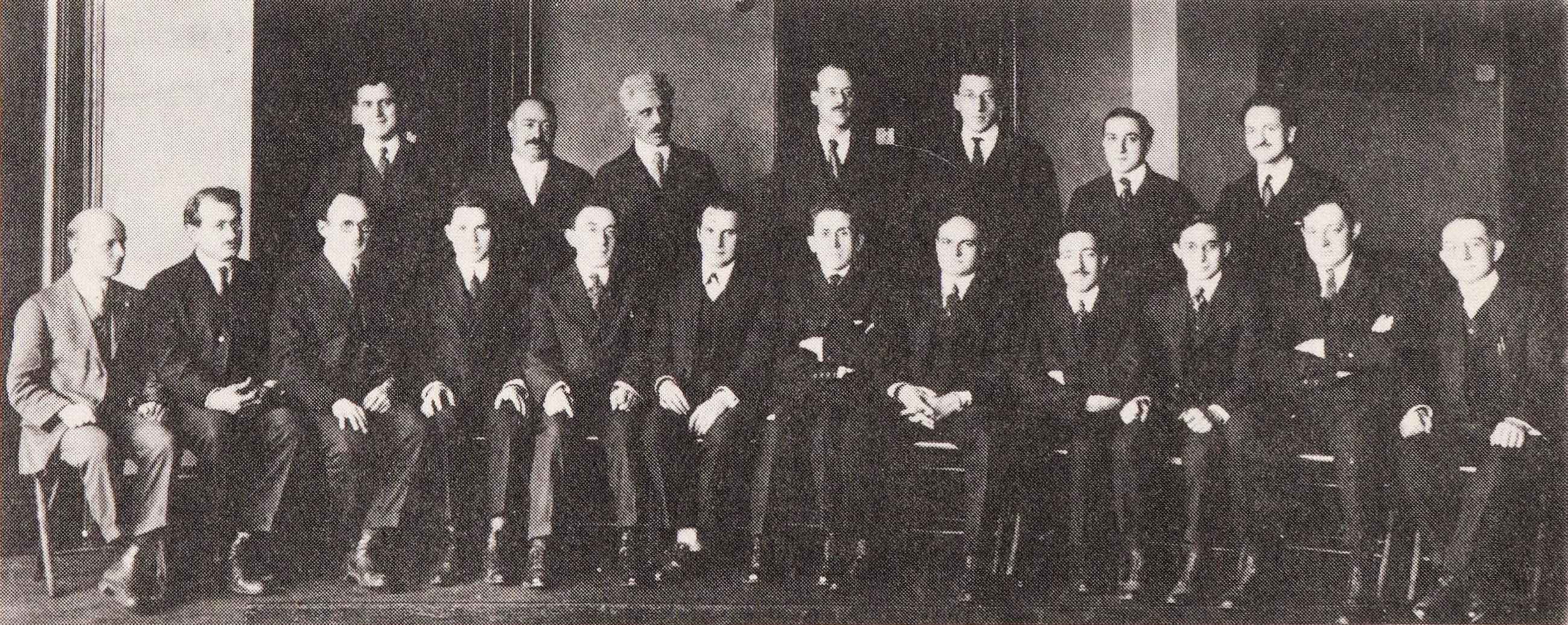
Socialists elected in New York City, 1917. Standing (L-R): Abraham Beckerman, Barnet Wolff, Alexander Braunstein, Algernon Lee, Baruch Charney Vladeck, Adolph Held, and Maurice Calman. Seated: August Claessens, William Feigenbaum, Elmer Rosenberg, Louis Waldman, Joseph Whitehorn, Jacob Panken, Abraham Shiplacoff, William Karlin, Samuel Orr, Charles B. Garfinkel, Benjamin Gitlow, and Joseph A. Weil.

During its height in the 1910s, the party fielded candidates for the office of Mayor, seats in the New York State Assembly and the House of Representatives. In 1917, several anti-war organizations along with SPNY gathered to discuss the War in Europe. When they nominated Morris Hillquit for Mayor, the party was afraid he along with other members faced imprisonment because of the party's anti-conscriptionist platform. During the national convention for the SPNY of 1917, the party decided to create a party bureau which would support socialist agitators who faced jail time or were sent behind bars. During the national convention in 1918, they discussed the crisis in Russia and the election strategy for the gubernatorial election which was held later in 1918.

In 1920, Samuel Orr, Louis Waldman, Charles Solomon, Samuel DeWitt, and August Claessens were called before the Speaker of the New York State Assembly. The five were charged with being unfit for membership in the Assembly through their membership in the Socialist Party of America and its state affiliate, and were suspended from their seats by a vote of 140 supporting to 6 against suspension. A protracted political trial followed as to the fitness of the five Socialists to assume their seats, which ran throughout the winter and spring. The trial began on January 20, 1920, and ended on March 11, ending with the Assembly voting overwhelmingly for expulsion on April 1, 1920.

== Socialist Party USA (1973-date) ==
The party is affiliated with the Socialist Party USA. It has a close relationship with the Green Party; as such, the Socialist Party almost never seeks ballot access, instead endorsing Green Party candidates (notably Howie Hawkins).

At the SPA's 1972 National Convention, which was held in Manhattan, the SPA changed its name to "Social Democrats, USA" by a vote of 73 to 34. During the convention, the majority won every vote, by a ratio of two to one. The Convention elected a national committee of 33 members, with 22 seats for the majority caucus, 8 seats for the coalition caucus of Michael Harrington, 2 for the Debs caucus, and one for the "independent" Samuel H. Friedman. Many former members of the Debs caucus joined David McReynolds in founding the Socialist Party of the United States of America in 1973.

After failing to renew their charter, the Socialist Party of New York City was revived in February 2017. As of April 2017, there are 3 locals of the Socialist Party in New York State; the Capital Region, Central New York and New York City.

== Presidential nominee results ==
In 1956, Darlington Hoopes ran as the final nominee of the Socialist Party of America but was not on the New York ballot. In 1976, following a split in the Socialist Party, Socialist Party USA began running independent candidates with the Socialist Party label. However, no SPUSA presidential nominee appeared on the ballot in New York until 2020, when Howie Hawkins was nominated by both SPUSA and the Green Party. He will appear on the ballot as a Green.

Year	Nominee	Total votes	Percent	Notes
1900	Eugene V. Debs	12,869	0.83%	Social Democratic Party of America nominee
1904	Eugene V. Debs	36,883	2.28%	
1908	Eugene V. Debs	38,451	2.35%	
1912	Eugene V. Debs	63,434	3.99%	
1916	Allan L. Benson	45,944	2.69%	
1920	Eugene V. Debs	203,201	7.01%	
1924	Robert M. La Follette	268,510	8.23%	Dual endorsed Progressive Party nominee
1928	Norman Thomas	107,332	2.44%	
1932	Norman Thomas	177,397	3.78%	
1936	Norman Thomas	86,897	1.55%	
1940	Norman Thomas	18,950	0.30%	
1944	Norman Thomas	10,553	0.17%	
1948	Norman Thomas	40,879	0.66%	
1952	Darlington Hoopes	2,664	0.04%	
2020	Howie Hawkins	32,832	0.38%	Dually nominated by the Socialist Party and the Green Party

== Members ==
=== Federal ===
- Meyer London, U.S. Representative (1915–19, 1921–23)
- George R. Lunn, U.S. Representative (1917–19) (elected as a Democrat), Lieutenant Governor of New York (1923–24) (elected as a Democrat), Mayor of Schenectady (1912–13, 1916–17, 1919–23)

=== State ===
- Matthew M. Levy, Justice of the New York Supreme Court (1951–71) (elected as a Democrat)
- Edmund Seidel, New York State Senator (1921–22)
- Herbert M. Merrill, New York State Assemblyman (1912)
- Abraham I. Shiplacoff, New York State Assemblyman (1916–18), New York City Alderman (1920–21)
- Joseph A. Whitehorn, New York State Assemblyman (1917–18)
- August Claessens, New York State Assemblyman (1918–20, 1922)
- William M. Feigenbaum, New York State Assemblyman (1918)
- Charles B. Garfinkel, New York State Assemblyman (1918)
- Benjamin Gitlow, New York State Assemblyman (1918)
- William Karlin, New York State Assemblyman (1918)
- Samuel Orr, New York State Assemblyman (1918, 1920, 1921)
- Elmer Rosenberg, New York State Assemblyman (1918)
- Louis Waldman, New York State Assemblyman (1918, 1920)
- Charles Solomon, New York State Assemblyman (1919–20, 1921)
- Sam DeWitt, New York State Assemblyman (1920)
- Henry Jager, New York State Assemblyman (1921)
- Nathaniel M. Minkoff, New York State Assemblyman (1938) (elected as an American Laborite)

=== Local ===
- John H. Gibbons, Mayor of Lackawanna (1920–22)
- Jacob Panken, Judge of the New York City Municipal Court (1918–27)
- Abraham Beckerman, New York City Alderman (1918–21)
- Alexander Braunstein, New York City Alderman (1918–21)
- Maurice Calman, New York City Alderman (1918–19)
- Edward F. Cassidy, New York City Alderman (1921)
- Adolph Held, New York City Alderman (1918–19)
- Algernon Lee, New York City Alderman (1918–19, 1921)
- Barnet Wolff, New York City Alderman (1918–19)
- Baruch Charney Vladeck, New York City Alderman (1918–21), New York City Councilman (1938) (elected as an American Laborite)
- Salvatore Ninfo, New York City Councilman (1938–43) (elected as an American Laborite)
- Harry W. Laidler, New York City Councilman (1940–41) (elected as an American Laborite)
- Louis P. Goldberg, New York City Councilman (1942–43, 1946–49) (elected as an Independent)
- Gertrude W. Klein, New York City Councilwoman (1942–45) (elected as an American Laborite)

== See also ==
- 1918–1920 New York City rent strikes
- New York City Democratic Socialists of America
