= 1917 New York City mayoral election =

- November 6, 1917
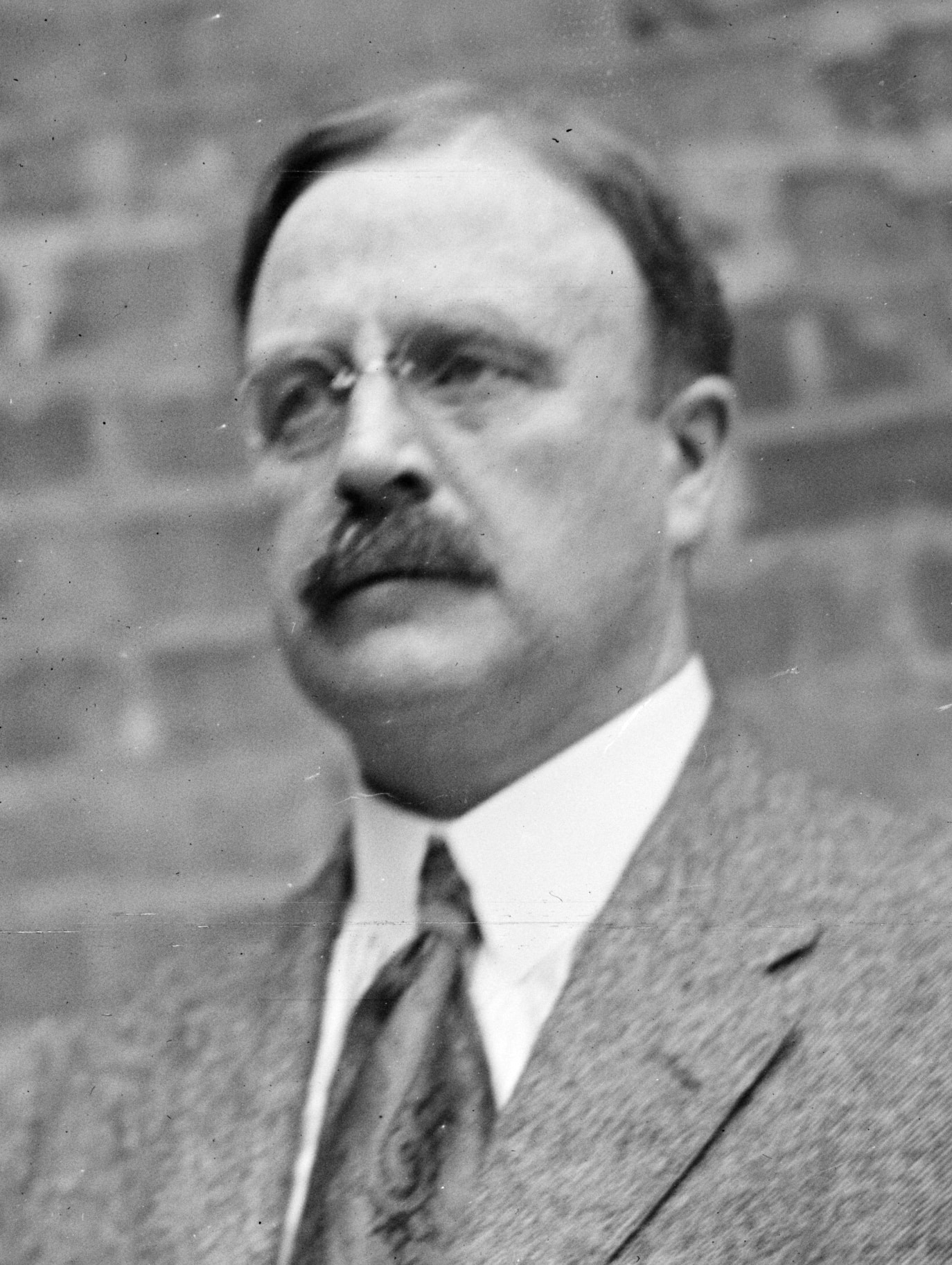

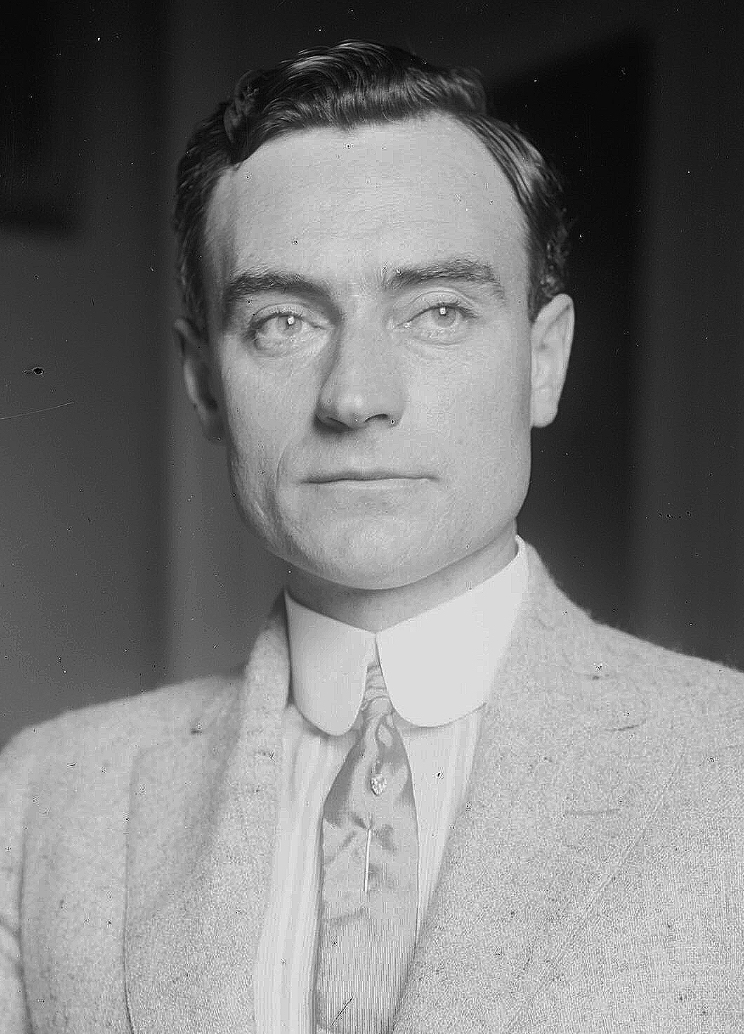

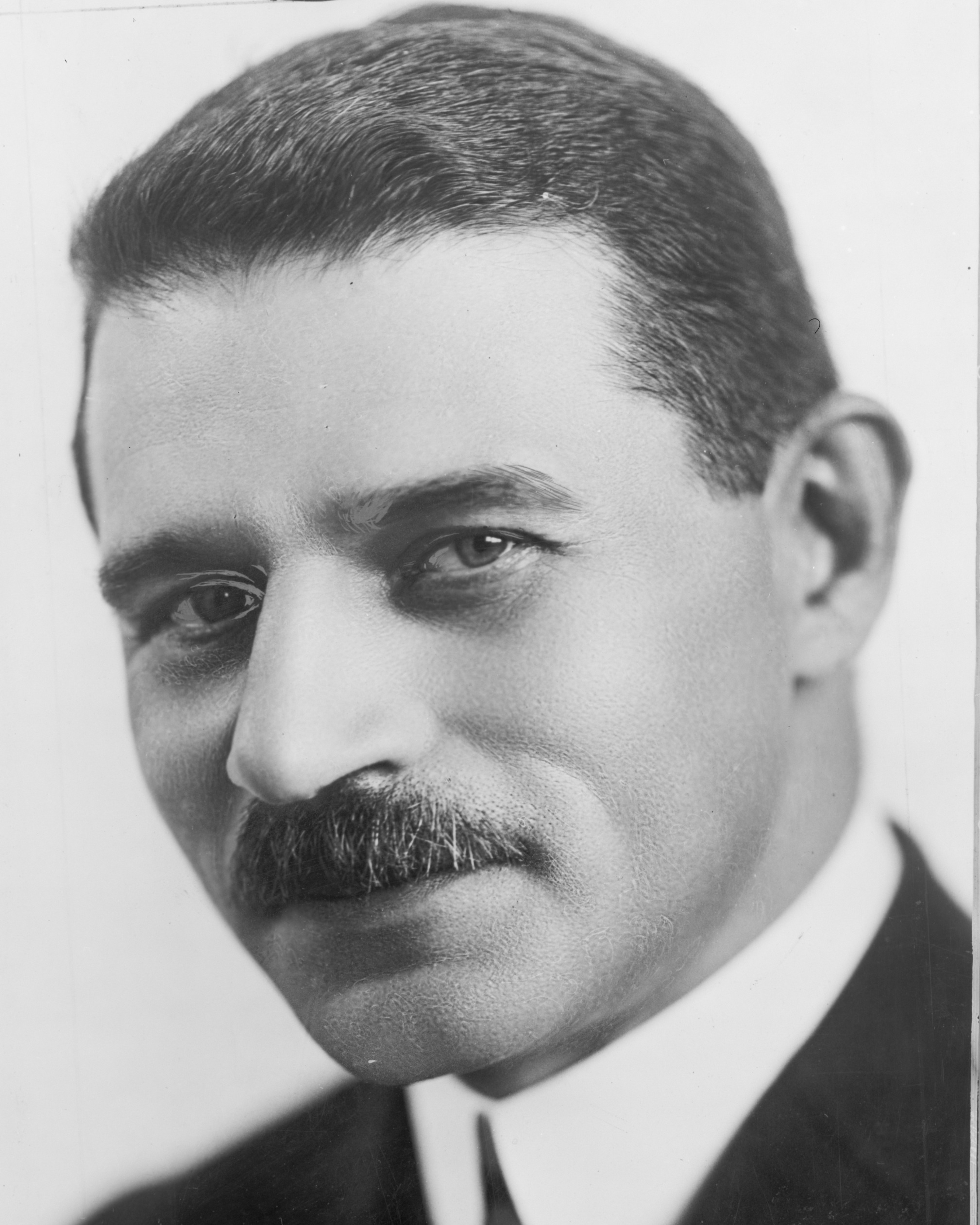

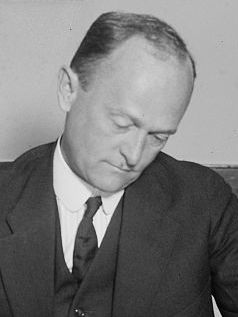
Candidate	John F. Hylan	John P. Mitchel
Party	Democratic	Fusion
Popular vote	314,010	155,497
Percentage	46.78%	23.16%
Candidate	Morris Hillquit	William M. Bennett
Party	Socialist	Republican
Popular vote	145,332	56,438
Percentage	21.65%	8.4%
- Results by Borough; Hylan: 40–50% 50–60%
Mayor before election
John P. Mitchel
Fusion Party
Elected mayor
John F. Hylan
Democratic

The 1917 New York City mayoral election was held on November 6, 1917. Incumbent mayor John Purroy Mitchel, elected as a Republican but running on the Fusion Party ticket, was defeated for re-election by Judge John Francis Hylan, a Democrat supported by Tammany Hall and William Randolph Hearst.

The election was notable not only for the first partisan primary elections for city offices, but for the contentious debate over American entry into World War I, vigorously supported by Mitchel and opposed by the Socialist candidate, Morris Hillquit. Mitchel and Hillquit each won about a fifth of the total vote, while Hylan won office with less than half the vote.

== Background ==
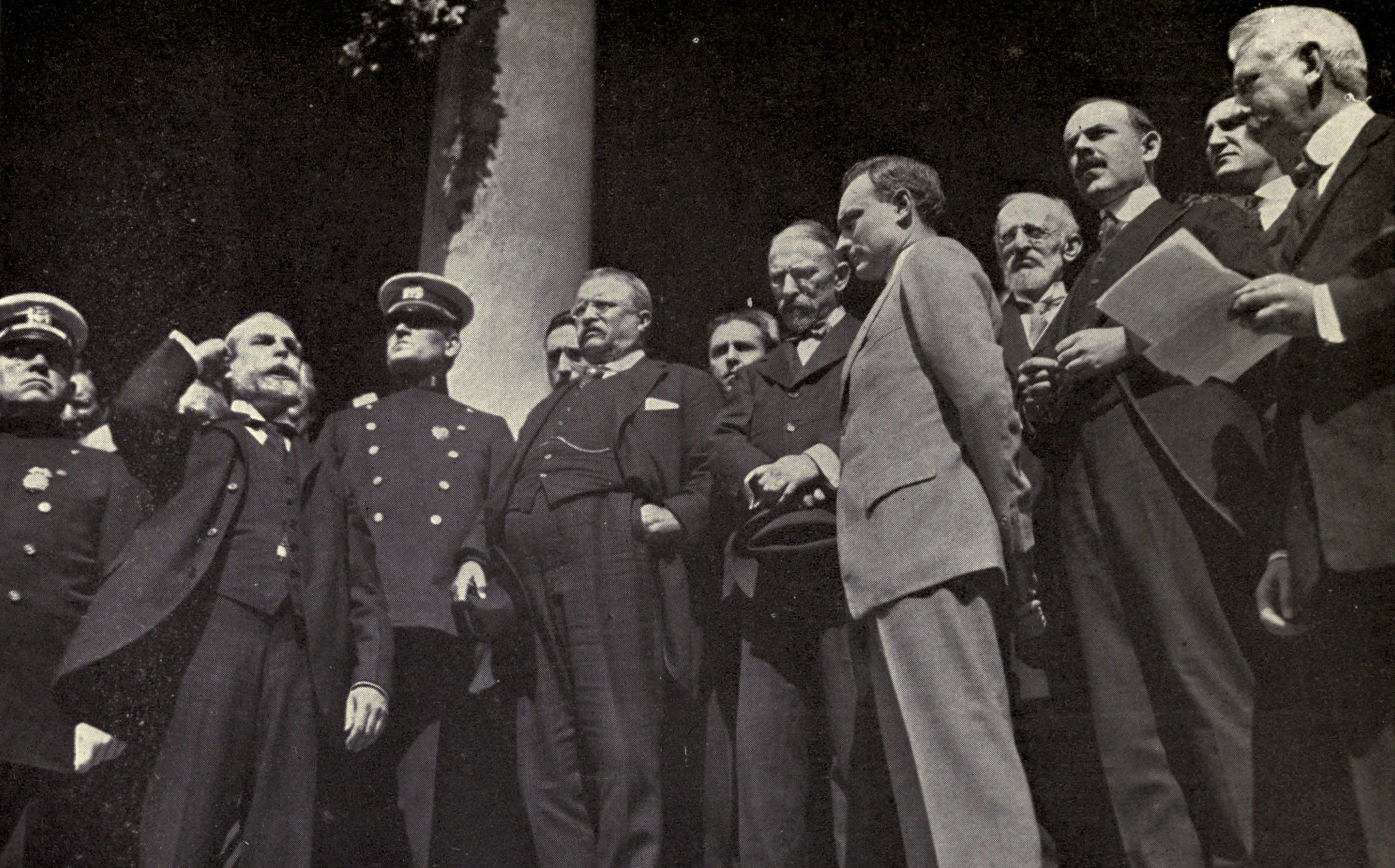
Charles Evans Hughes, Theodore Roosevelt, Henry Morgenthau, Oscar Straus, and other distinguished citizens pledge their support to Mayor John Purroy Mitchel on the steps of New York City Hall, October 1, 1917

John Purroy Mitchel, a Republican, was nominated for mayor in 1913 on an electoral fusion ticket. Mitchel had gained a reputation as a reformer and opponent of Tammany Hall for his investigations into corruption in city government. After incumbent mayor William Jay Gaynor died on September 10, 1913, from complications stemming from his attempted assassination in 1910, Mitchel won the general election in a landslide over Democratic nominee Edward E. McCall and Socialist nominee Charles Edward Russell and became the second youngest mayor in New York City history.

As mayor, Mitchel's popularity sharply waned. His continued cuts to public spending, strong support for private transit, and proposed education reforms under the Gary Plan were unpopular with voters, and although a staunch Irish Catholic, his investigations into Catholic charities for corruption and fraud alienated the city's large Catholic population.

Beginning in 1916, political debate centered on American involvement in World War I, which Mitchel vigorously supported. His focus on national and international issues, as well as his frequent socialization with the city's elite, further eroded his popularity, as voters saw him as out of touch with local concerns. On April 6, the United States officially declared war and began to mobilize its military for deployment.

In contrast to Mitchel's support for the war, the Socialist Party came out strongly against American involvement. Morris Hillquit, a leading socialist from Manhattan, co-authored the national party's St. Louis Manifesto, which proclaimed,

The Socialist Party of the United States in the present grave crisis solemnly reaffirms its allegiance to the principle of internationalism and working-class solidarity the world over, and proclaims its unalterable opposition to the war just declared by the Government of the United States.

Hillquit's refusal to support the war by such acts as buying Liberty Bonds won the Socialists new support in many immigrant communities.

== Republican primary ==
=== Candidates ===
- William M. Bennett, former State Senator from Lower Manhattan and candidate for Governor in 1916
- John Purroy Mitchel, incumbent mayor since 1914

=== Results ===
The Republican nomination was tightly contested and resulted in an official recount, with Bennett narrowly defeating Mitchel for the party's nomination. Mitchel appeared to win the initial count, but a series of counting mistakes and revelations of electoral fraud, resulting in criminal indictments, gave a narrow victory to Bennett. Bennett declined to withdraw from the race, and attempts to find a compromise anti-Tammany candidate failed, leading Mitchel to wage an independent campaign for re-election.

== Democratic primary ==
=== Candidates ===
- John Francis Hylan

==== Declined ====
- Al Smith, sheriff of New York County and former Speaker of the New York Assembly

=== Campaign ===
Al Smith initially sought to run for mayor, but Tammany Hall leader Charles F. Murphy preferred Hylan as a candidate with the support of William Randolph Hearst and Brooklyn party leader John McCooey. Instead, Smith was selected as the party's nominee for president of the board of aldermen in 1916, which he won.

== General election ==
=== Candidates ===
- William M. Bennett, former State Senator from Lower Manhattan and candidate for Governor in 1916 (Republican)
- Morris Hillquit, candidate for U.S. Representative in 1906 and 1908 (Socialist)
- John Francis Hylan, Brooklyn judge (Democratic)
- John Purroy Mitchel, incumbent mayor since 1914 (Fusion)

=== Campaign ===
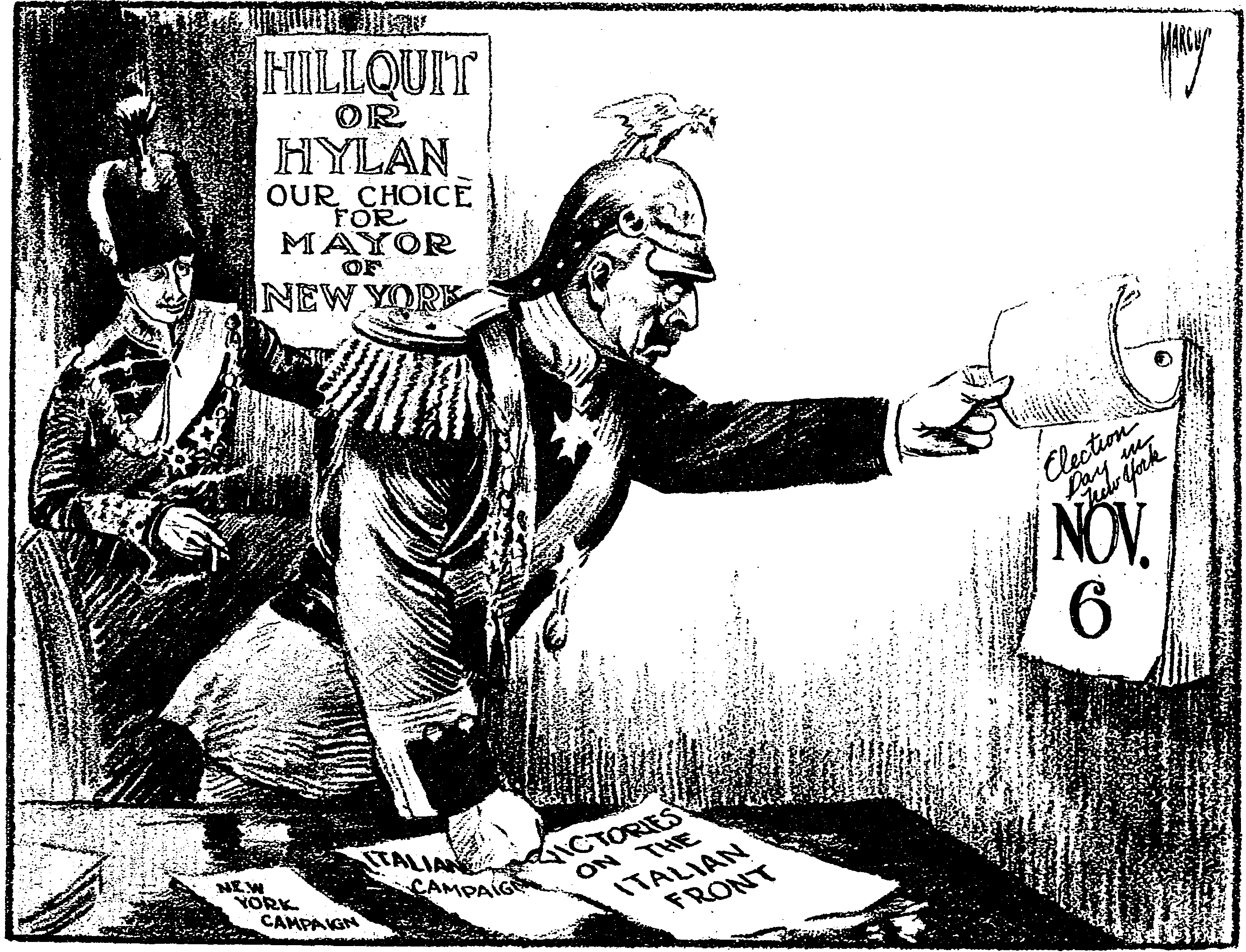
"The New Western Front", a New York Times cartoon implying Kaiser Wilhelm II favored Hillquit and Hylan. The caption read, "Crown Prince: 'Any more victories, Papa?' - Kaiser: 'I can't tell until Tuesday.'"

The Fall 1917 election, which The New York Times called a "puzzle without parallel", would have been exciting even had it occurred in peacetime.

Hylan's position on the war was unclear; he focused instead on criticisms of the administration's support for private transit corporations.

In the final weeks, the Fusion campaign focused its attacks on Hillquit. Mayor Mitchel hinted at Hillquit's foreign birth by saying that "any man who will not buy a Liberty bond when he can afford them is not fit to be a citizen of the United States", and former President Theodore Roosevelt declared that Hillquit "stands as an aid to the Prussianized autocracy of the Hohenzollerns."

=== Results ===
As of 2026, this is the highest percentage of the vote the Socialist Party has received in a mayoral election; the party also elected ten State Assemblymen, seven city Aldermen, and a municipal court judge.

1917 New York City mayoral election
Party	Candidate	Votes	%	±%
Democratic	John Francis Hylan	314,010	45.39%	▲8.1
Fusion	John P. Mitchel (incumbent)	155,497	22.48%	▼34.6
Socialist	Morris Hillquit	145,332	21.01%	▲15.9
Republican	William M. Bennett	56,438	8.2%	N/A
Socialist Labor	Edmund Seidel			
Total votes		691,809	100.00%	

=== Results by borough ===
Hylan won every borough, though he carried a majority only in Queens and Staten Island. Mayor Mitchel ran second in every borough but the Bronx, where Hillquit pushed Mitchel into third place; he came within two hundred votes of doing the same in Queens. Bennett came in fourth in each borough except Staten Island, where he finished third ahead of Hillquit.

candidate	party	Manhattan	The Bronx	Brooklyn	Queens	Richmond (Staten Is.)	Total	%
John Francis Hylan	Democratic	113,728	41,546	114,487	35,399	8,850	314,010	46.8%
John Francis Hylan	Democratic	46.4%	42.9%	46.5%	51.7%	58.3%	314,010	46.8%
John Purroy Mitchel	Fusion	66,748	19,247	52,921	13,641	2,940	155,497	23.2%
John Purroy Mitchel	Fusion	27.3%	19.9%	21.5%	19.9%	19.4%	155,497	23.2%
Morris Hillquit	Socialist	51,176	30,374	48,880	13,477	1,425	145,332	21.7%
Morris Hillquit	Socialist	20.9%	31.4%	19.9%	19.7%	9.4%	145,332	21.7%
William M. Bennett	Republican	13,230	5,576	29,748	5,916	1,968	56,438	8.4%
William M. Bennett	Republican	5.4%	5.8%	12.1%	8.6%	13.0%	56,438	8.4%
Subtotal		244,882	96,743	246,036	68,433	15,183	671,277	
Edmund Seidel	Socialist Labor						20,586	
others							20,586	
T O T A L							691,809	

[Others and Total from The Encyclopedia of New York City (Yale, 1995), which does not exactly match the other numbers, taken from The World Almanac for 1929 & 1943.]

== Aftermath ==
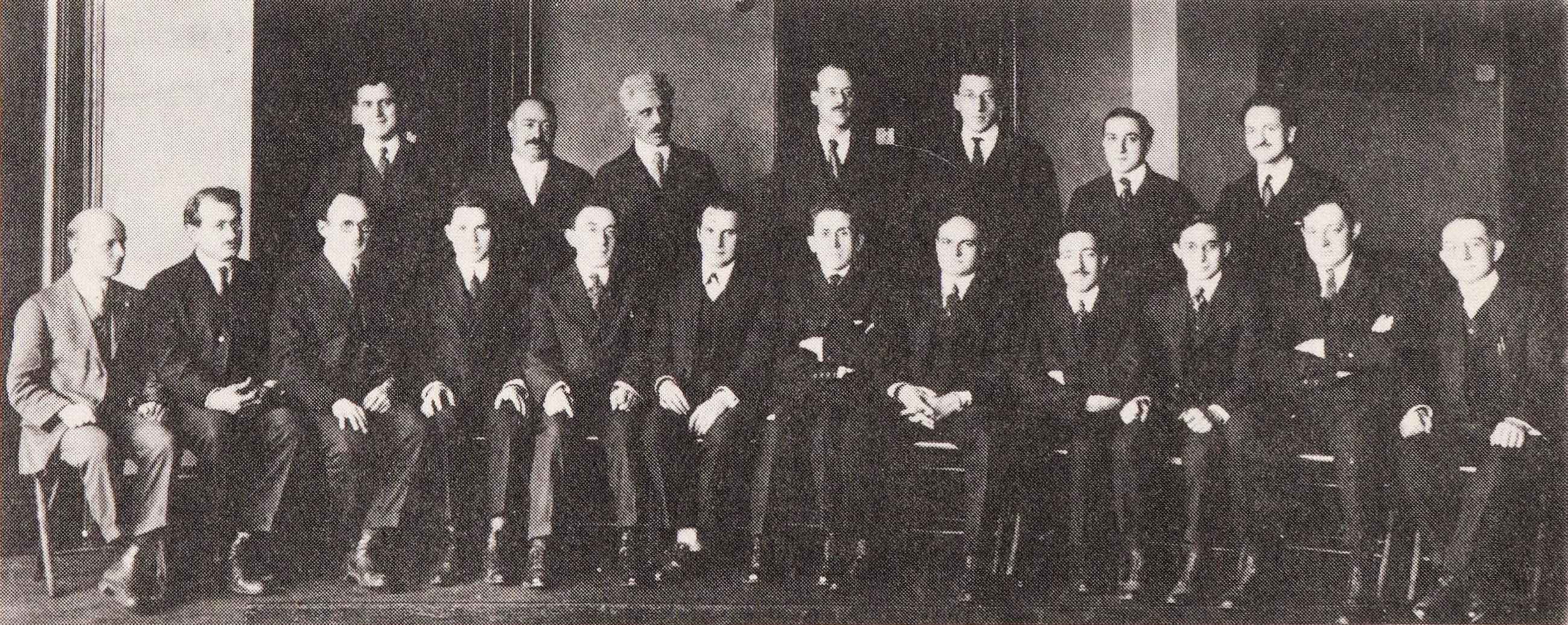
Socialists elected in New York City, 1917. Standing (L-R): Abraham Beckerman, Barnet Wolff, Alexander Braunstein, Algernon Lee, Baruch Charney Vladeck, Adolph Held, and Maurice Calman. Seated: August Claessens, William Feigenbaum, Elmer Rosenberg, Louis Waldman, Joseph Whitehorn, Jacob Panken, Abraham Shiplacoff, William Karlin, Samuel Orr, Charles B. Garfinkel, Benjamin Gitlow, and Joseph A. Weil.

John F. Hylan was decisively re-elected in 1921, but he lost the 1925 Democratic primary to Jimmy Walker after a split among Democratic borough leaders, reflecting the deep enmity between Hylan's patron, William Randolph Hearst, and Al Smith.

Following his defeat, Mitchel volunteered for service with the U.S. Army Signal Corps. He fell out of his aircraft to his death while training on July 6, 1918, exactly eight months after the election.

The Socialist Party, which drew heavy scrutiny from the federal government following the Russian Revolution and First Red Scare suffered crippling losses in the following years. In 1919, many of its members resigned to found the American Communist movement. Morris Hillquit, who remained with the party he had helped to found, ran again for mayor again in 1932, received an eighth of the vote, and died the following year.

== See also ==
- New York City mayoral elections
- Characteristics of New York City mayoral elections
- History of New York City
- Socialist Party of America
- Tammany Hall
- J. Raymond Jones

== Sources ==
- The New York Times archives for September–November, 1917
- Eda Amberg (1921), Civic lessons from Mayor Mitchel's defeat, New York City: Institute for Public Service, OL 7065738M
- The World Almanac and Book of Facts for 1929 and 1943
- James Weinstein, The Decline of Socialism in America, 1912-1925 (New York 1967: Monthly Review Press & 1969: Vintage)
- David A. Shannon, The Socialist Party of America: a history (New York 1950: Macmillan and Chicago 1967: Quadrangle)
- The Encyclopedia of New York City, edited by Kenneth T. Jackson (New Haven, Connecticut, 1995: Yale University Press & New York Historical Society) ISBN 0-300-05536-6
