= Joseph A. Weil =

American socialist politician (1871–1952)

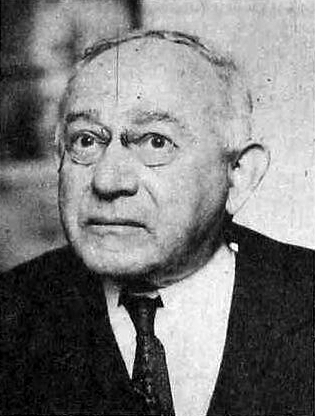
- Weil c. 1942
- Born: Joseph Aaron Weil; August 20, 1871; Kingdom of Hungary, Austro-Hungarian Empire
- Died: May 15, 1952 (aged 80); New York City, U.S.
- Occupation: Politician
- Political party: Socialist Labor (1895–1899); Social Democratic (1899–1901); Socialist (1901–1936); American Labor (1936–1944); Liberal (1944–1952)
- Spouse(s): Henrietta (died); Sidonia
- Children: Gertrude; Louis; Peggy

Joseph Aaron Weil (August 20, 1871 – May 15, 1952) was a Hungarian-born Jewish-American newspaperman and politician. He designed the "arm and torch" emblem of the Social Democratic Party of America, which would later be used by the Socialist Party of New York.

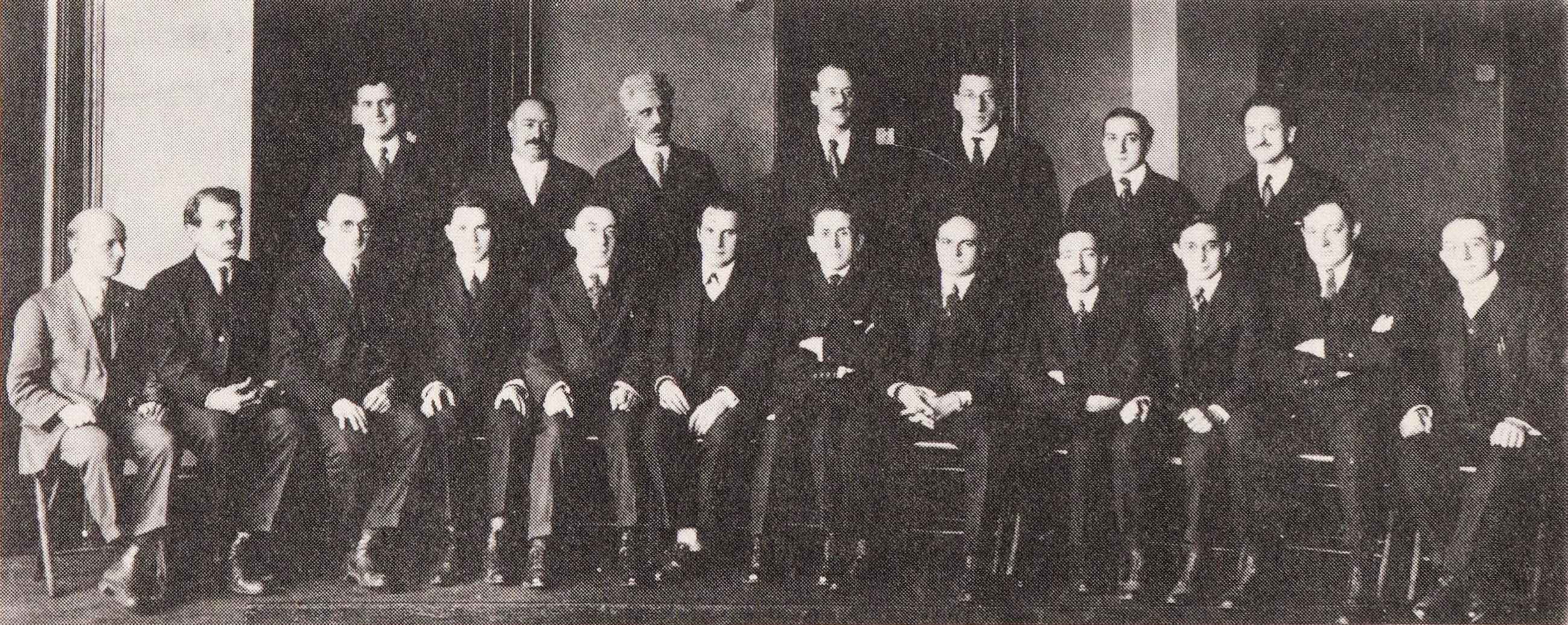
Weil (seated, far right) erroneously included amongst Socialists elected in New York City, 1917. Standing (L-R): Abraham Beckerman, Barnet Wolff, Alexander Braunstein, Algernon Lee, Baruch Charney Vladeck, Adolph Held, and Maurice Calman. Seated: August Claessens, William Feigenbaum, Elmer Rosenberg, Louis Waldman, Joseph Whitehorn, Jacob Panken, Abraham Shiplacoff, William Karlin, Samuel Orr, Charles B. Garfinkel, Benjamin Gitlow, and Joseph Weil.

Weil was a frequent candidate for public office, running no less than two dozen times over the course of his career. The closest he came to victory was in 1917, when he ran for State Assembly in the 19th Kings County district; initial returns showed a tie with Democrat Benjamin Klingman, but the final results including the overseas ballots of soldiers gave Klingman a winning margin of less than 100 votes out of over 7,000 cast.

Outside of electoral politics, Weil was a co-founder of the New York Call, and later worked in the advertising department of The Jewish Daily Forward. He died at his home in Brooklyn, New York on May 15, 1952.

His daughter was Gertrude W. Klein, a Socialist politician in her own right, who was elected to the New York City Council in 1941 on the American Labor Party ticket.
