= William M. Feigenbaum =

American politician (1886–1949)

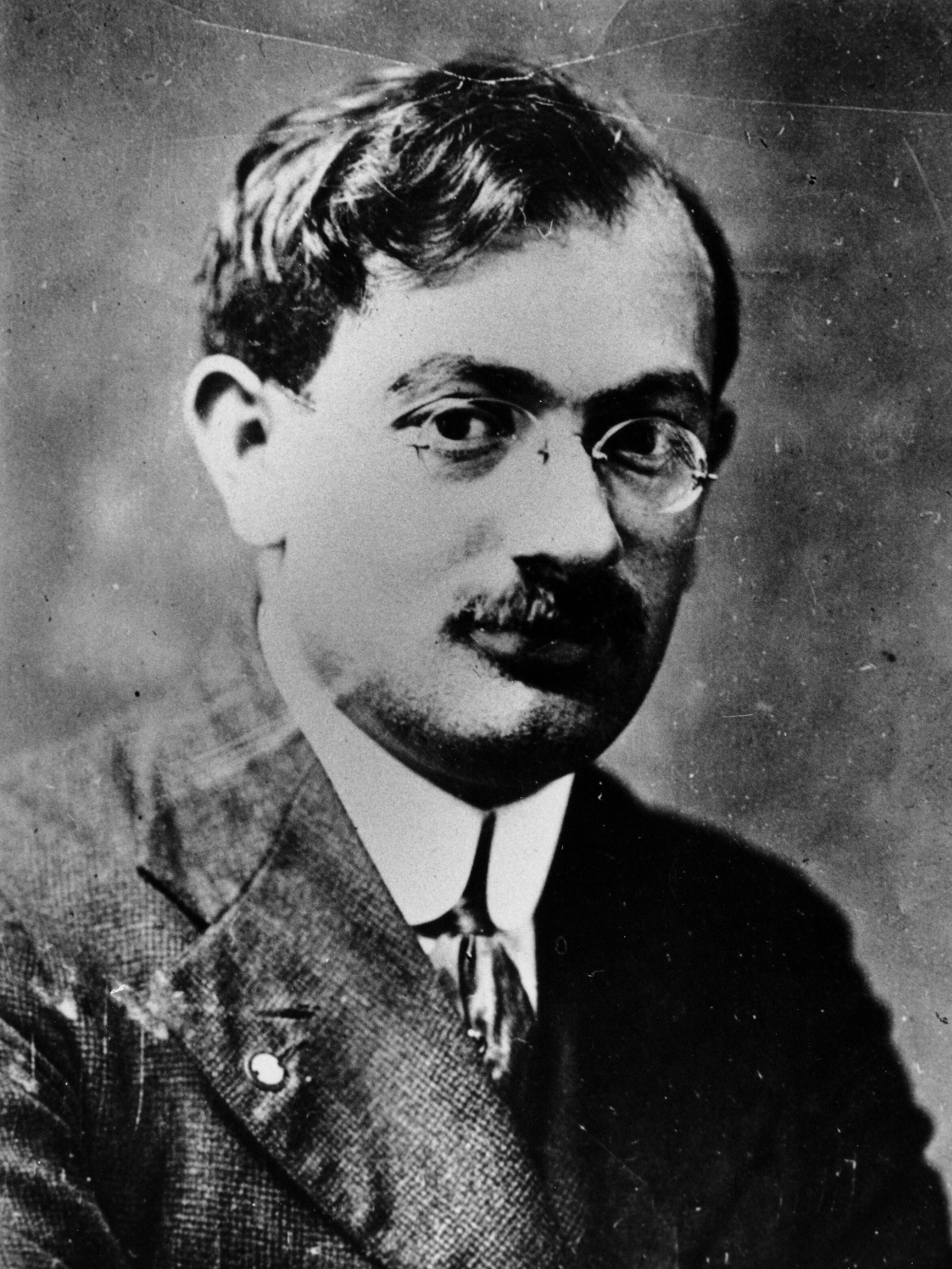
- Feigenbaum c. 1917

Member of the New York State Assembly from the 6th Kings district
- In office January 1, 1918 – December 31, 1918
- Preceded by: Nathan D. Shapiro
- Succeeded by: Martin Solomon

Personal details
- Born: December 25, 1886 Antwerp, Belgium
- Died: April 23, 1949 (aged 62) New York City, U.S.
- Party: Socialist (before 1936); American Labor (after 1936)
- Other political affiliations: Social Democratic Federation (after 1936)
- Parent: Benjamin Feigenbaum (father)
- Education: Columbia University (A.M.)
- Occupation: Statistician, journalist, politician

William Morris Feigenbaum (December 25, 1886 – April 23, 1949) was a Belgian-born Jewish-American statistician, journalist and politician from New York. He served as a Socialist member of the New York State Assembly in 1918.

== Early life and education ==
William Feigenbaum was born on Christmas Day 1886, in Antwerp, Belgium, the son of Benjamin Feigenbaum and Matilda (Kaminsky) Feigenbaum, both originally from Warsaw.

The family emigrated to the United States and settled in Brooklyn, where William attended the public schools and Boys High School. He graduated with a B.A. from Columbia College in 1907, and then earned an M.A. from Columbia University in 1908. He also took courses at Dartmouth College, Wisconsin University, and the National University School of Law.

== Career ==
From 1909 to 1912, Feigenbaum worked in the Bureau of Statistics and Accounts of the Interstate Commerce Commission in Washington, D.C. In 1912, he returned to New York and worked for the New York Public Service Commission (1st D.).

Like his father, Feigenbaum was a member of the Socialist Party of America. In November 1916, he ran for Congress in the 10th District, but was defeated by the incumbent Republican Reuben L. Haskell.

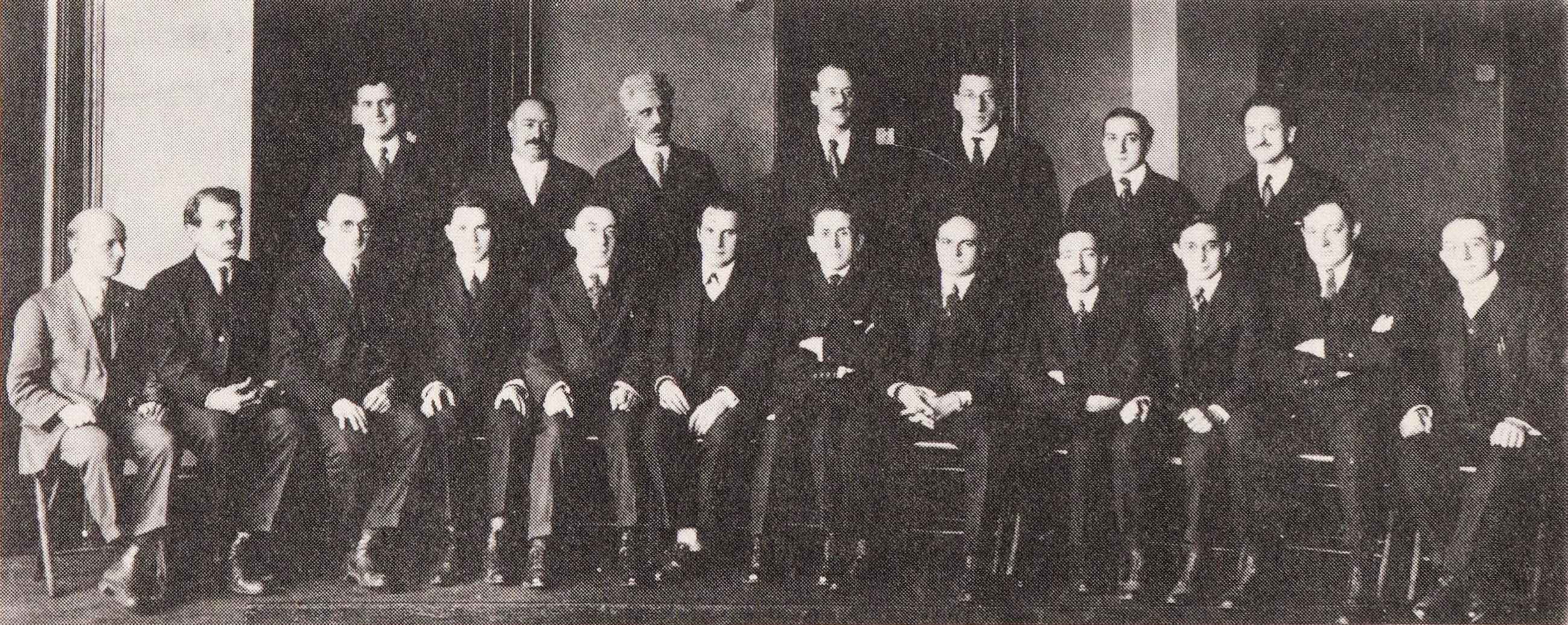
Socialists elected in New York City, 1917. Standing (L-R): Abraham Beckerman, Barnet Wolff, Alexander Braunstein, Algernon Lee, Baruch Charney Vladeck, Adolph Held, and Maurice Calman. Seated: August Claessens, William Feigenbaum, Elmer Rosenberg, Louis Waldman, Joseph Whitehorn, Jacob Panken, Abraham Shiplacoff, William Karlin, Samuel Orr, Charles B. Garfinkel, Benjamin Gitlow, and Joseph A. Weil.

In November 1917, Feigenbaum was elected to the New York State Assembly (Kings County, 6th District), defeating the incumbent Republican Nathan D. Shapiro. Feigenbaum polled 3,694 votes, Shapiro polled 3,184 votes, and Democrat Martin Solomon polled 2,217. Feigenbaum was one of ten Socialist members of the 141st New York State Legislature in 1918.

After losing reelection in 1918, Feigenbaum became the associate editor of The New Leader, and wrote for several newspapers and political magazines. He was again an unsuccessful candidate for the State Assembly in 1919, 1922 and 1923, as well as for the U.S. Congress in 1924, 1926, and 1928, and for State Senate in 1930, 1932 and 1934.

After the Old Guard faction of the Socialist Party broke away in 1936, Feigenbaum joined them in forming the Social Democratic Federation. He was later involved with the American Labor Party.

Feigenbaum died on April 23, 1949, at the Montgomery Nursing Home in Brooklyn.

New York State Assembly
| Preceded by Nathan D. Shapiro | New York State Assembly; Kings County, 6th District; 1918 | Succeeded by Martin Solomon |
