= Gertrude W. Klein =

American politician (1893–1986)

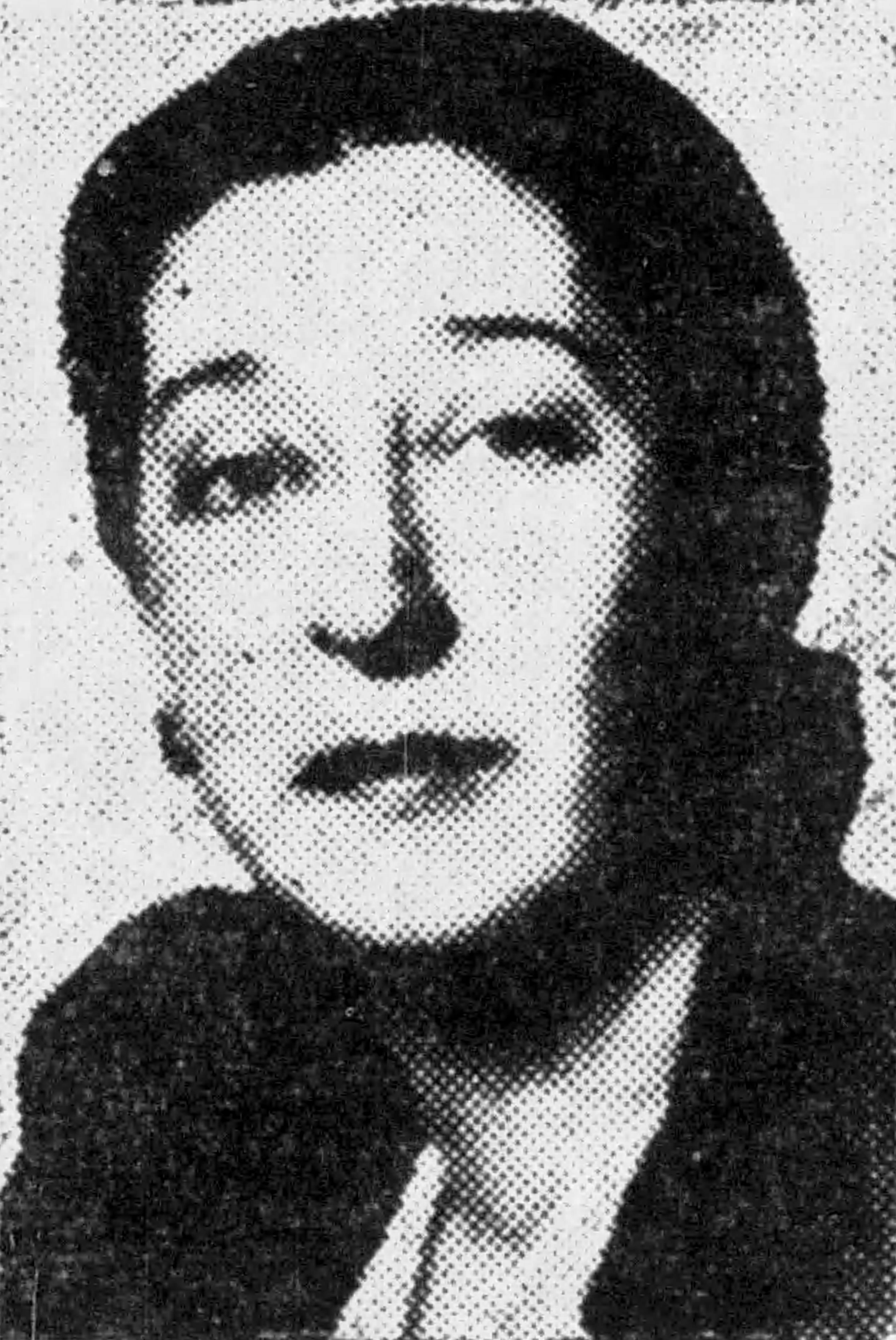
- Klein c. 1943

Member of the New York City Council from The Bronx At-Large
- In office January 1, 1942 – December 31, 1945
- Preceded by: Multi-member district
- Succeeded by: Multi-member district

Personal details
- Born: Gertrude Weil; August 25, 1893 New York City, New York, U.S.
- Died: July 24, 1986 (aged 92) New York City, New York, U.S.
- Party: Socialist; American Labor; Liberal
- Spouse: Joseph E. Klein
- Children: Donald; Ruth
- Parent: Joseph A. Weil (father)
- Education: Columbia University
- Occupation: Politician

Gertrude Weil Klein (August 25, 1893 – July 24, 1986) was an American Labor Party and Socialist Party politician who served on the New York City Council from 1942 to 1945. She was one of the first women elected to that body.

== Biography ==
Gertrude Weil was born in the Bronx on August 25, 1893. Her father, Joseph A. Weil, was a socialist who designed the arm-and-torch logo of the Social Democratic Party of America. Gertrude worked as a secretary to Abraham Shiplacoff of the Amalgamated Clothing Workers of America and eventually became the educational director for the ACWA. She married fellow Socialist Joseph A. Klein. She was Jewish.

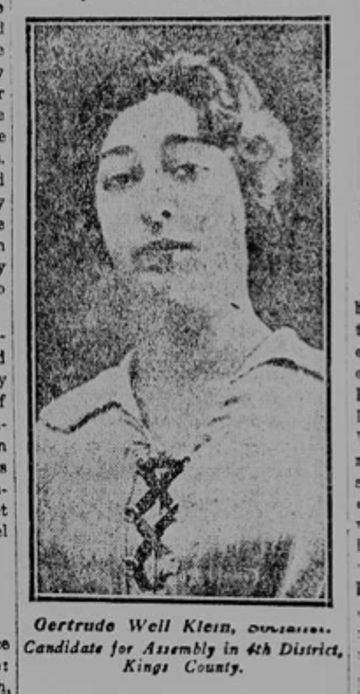
Newspaper clipping from Klein's State Assembly candidacy, 1919

Klein first ran for office as the Brooklyn Fourth Assembly District candidate for New York State Assembly in 1918, on the Socialist Party ticket. She contributed a daily column to The New Leader, where in 1935 she argued that women were better Socialists since they were more practical and loyal to the Socialist Party than their male comrades. That same year, she claimed that she had heard Clifford Odets say that "workers stink". Odets denied the remark in a telegram and he received an apology from the New Leader's editor.

Along with Genevieve Earle and Rita Casey, Klein was one of three women elected to the New York City Council in November 1941. Klein was reelected to the Council in 1943, as the American Labor Party's candidate. In the election, she received the endorsement of Fiorello La Guardia, who described her as "one of the most useful members of the Council". In 1945, Klein ran unsuccessfully as an independent, having lost the support of the ALP. She lost the election to Michael J. Quill, who was the American Labor Party's candidate. Klein stated that she could not continue in the ALP "after they were taken over by the left wing".
