= Benjamin Feigenbaum =

Polish born Yiddish socialist, newspaper editor, translator, and satirist

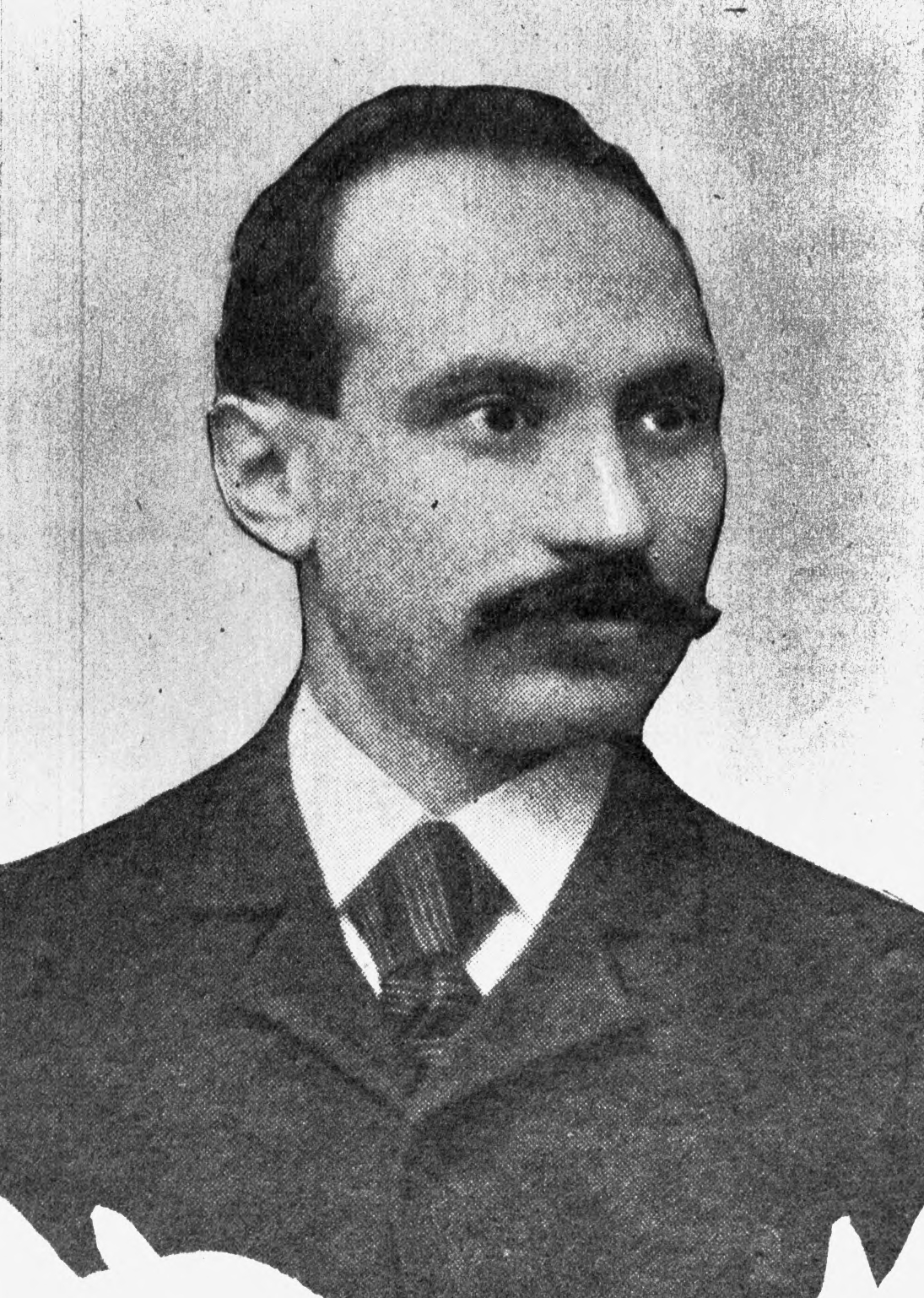
- Feigenbaum in 1892
- Born: August 12, 1860; Warsaw, Poland
- Died: November 10, 1932; New York City
- Resting place: Mount Carmel Cemetery, New York
- Occupations: Newspaper editor; satirist; translator
- Spouse: Mathilda Feigenbaum
- Children: 4 (including William, Henry, Belle Kanin and R. Ganetkin)
- Writing career
- Language: Yiddish, English, Polish
- Subjects: Socialism, secularism

Benjamin Feigenbaum (August 12, 1860 – November 10, 1932) was a Polish-born Jewish socialist, newspaper editor, translator, and satirist. Feigenbaum was an associate editor of the Yiddish language The Forward, its predecessor Di Arbeter Tsaytung, and the literary monthly Di Tsukunft, co-founder of the Workmen's Circle, and a pioneer of the Socialist Party of America.

== Early life ==
Benjamin Feigenbaum was born to a prominent Chassidic family in Warsaw, Poland. He went to Yeshivah, but became a free-thinker. According to colleague Israel Joshua Singer, Feigenbaum's "conversion" to secularism happened when his teacher, the Gerer rebbe discovered that Feigenbaum was not wearing tsitsit, a ritual garb. The rebbe beat him as a punishment.

After moving to Belgium, he attended his first socialist protest in Antwerp in 1884. He contributed to the local Flemish socialist newspaper De Werker.

On December 25, 1886, his wife Matilda (née: Kaminsky) gave birth to their son William Morris Feigenbaum, who also later became a prominent socialist. Benjamin had two daughters and two sons, named Kanin, R. Ganetkin, William, and Henry.

== Career ==
=== London ===
As a young socialist in 1887, Feigenbaum considered starting a socialist Yiddish newspaper. To his delight, he discovered the newly created London-based Arbeter Fraynd. He contacted them immediately. Feigenbaum moved with his wife to London towards the end of 1888, to join their editorial board.

During the Jewish Holiday of Yom Kippur in 1888, Feigenbaum hosted the first public Yom Kippur Ball. In 1889 at another Yom Kippur Ball, Feigenbaum famously declared "If there is a God and if he is Almighty as the clergy claims he is, I give him just two minutes' time to kill me on the spot, so that he may prove his existence!". After two minutes he declared "See! There is no God!". He then announced a location for the workers to eat instead of fasting, as traditionally done during Yom Kippur.

=== New York ===
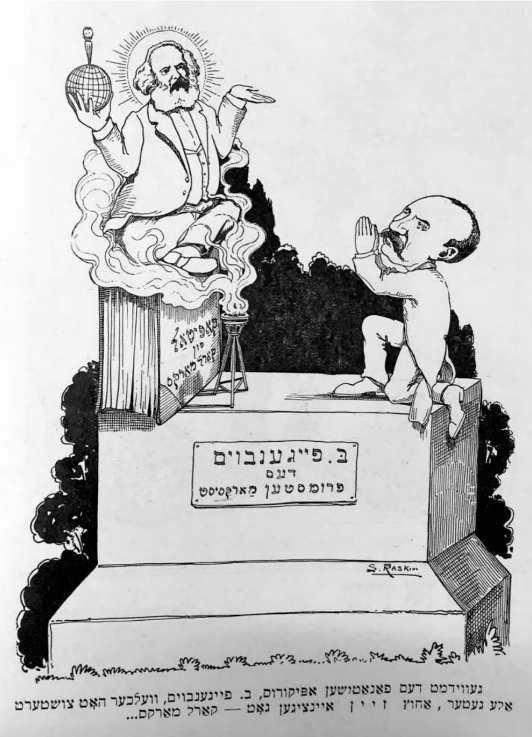
"B. Feigenbaum, the most observant Marxist". Below caption says "Dedicated to extremist, blasphemous B. Feigenbaum, who rejects all gods except his own, Karl Marx.", 1912.

Feigenbaum immigrated to New York in 1891 to work on New York's first Yiddish-language socialist weekly,Di Arbeter Tsaytung (The Workman's Paper) along with the daily Dos Abend Blatt (The Evening Paper) as an associate-editor. He contributed to Forward and Morgen Zhurnal.

He co-founded the Workmen's Circle, serving as its first general secretary. In New York, Feigenbaum developed a relationship with Bolesław Miklaszewski, a representative of the London affiliate of the Polish Socialist Party (PPS), named the Union of Polish Socialists Abroad (ZZSP). After vetting Feigenbaum's circles to ensure they did not have "a gravitational pull" to Russia, ZZSP announced the creation of a "Jewish Socialist Post from America to Poland" in 1896 to publish and disseminate Yiddish socialist literature.

In 1909, Feigenbaum chaired a meeting of predominantly Jewish women shirtwaist workers on whether to strike, held inside the Great Hall of Cooper Union. After hours and multiple speakers cautioned against striking, a Yiddish-speaking shirtwaist worker named Clara Lemlich made her way to the podium and declared "I move that we go on a general strike!" to which the crowd roared enthusiastically. Feigenbaum asked the crowd to take an biblically inspired oath "If I turn traitor to the cause I now pledge, may my hand wither from the arm I now raise", which subsequently led to the largest women's strike in US history.

Feigenbaum was frequently a candidate for public office on the Socialist ticket, running for State Assembly seven times between 1906 and 1918, in addition to State Senate once in 1912. In his last election, he ran alongside his son William, who was also a candidate for the Assembly in a neighboring district.

== Police retaliation ==
Feigenbaum was arrested during a brawl with the police on October 29, 1892, shortly after giving a speech in Philadelphia. He was charged with inciting to riot, assaulting an officer and breaching the peace after allegedly hitting an officer with his cane. He was held on $600 bail.

In Providence, he was charged with inciting to riot, charges which were later dismissed by a judge during trial in a higher court. In January, 1905, Providence police received a tip that an "anarchist provocateur" was scheduled to speak. Police surrounded the designated venue, disabled the gas and cited the lack of permit to shut the event down. The sponsors of the lecture, the Providence branch of the Workmen's Circle obtained the relevant permits and scheduled another venue for Feigenbaum to speak at. Hyman Goldsmith was a Yiddish-speaking undercover police officer assigned to Feigenbaum. Had Feigenbaum mentioned anything related to "Emma Goldmanism" or "bomb throwing", Goldsmith would have had the halls cleared immediately by the other undercover police in the crowd. Instead, Feigenbaum orated for two hours and 15 minutes about the compatibility of religion and socialism, in sharp contrast with his past anti-theist recitals. The police were ridiculed the following day by The Daily Journal, The Evening Bulletin, and The Providence Telegram.

== Criticism of Zionism and religion ==
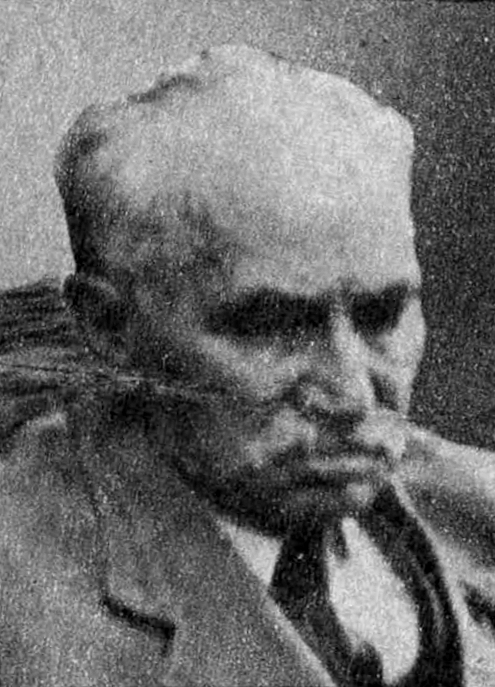
Feigenbaum later in life

Feigenbaum was highly critical of Zionism and the usage of biblical scriptures in promoting "socialist spiritualization". In the Yiddish article, 'Materialism in Judaism or Religion and Life' (1896), Feigenbaum criticized using the Bible as "propaganda", noting that if Jeremiah did not know Marx, then it was disingenuous to claim that Marxism is part of a prophetic tradition. In 'Vi Kumt a yid tsu sotsyialismus' (How does a Jew come to socialism?), Feigenbaum wrote "Yes, brothers, socialism is redemption for us, the Jews. Socialism will rescue all the unfortunate people, Jews as well, and give them equal rights... Socialism's victory would spell the only effective defeat of the forces of antisemitism". He further maintained that he met socialist Gentiles who "ridded themselves of antisemitism upon discovering socialism. The enemy is the capitalist, whether Gentile or Jewish; and the Jewish poor are his friend."

Feigenbaum rejected Zionism as utopian and urged Jews to reject the notion of Goles as exile from Palestine. Instead, exile should be understood as the state of persecution, from which socialism can redeem them.

== Death ==
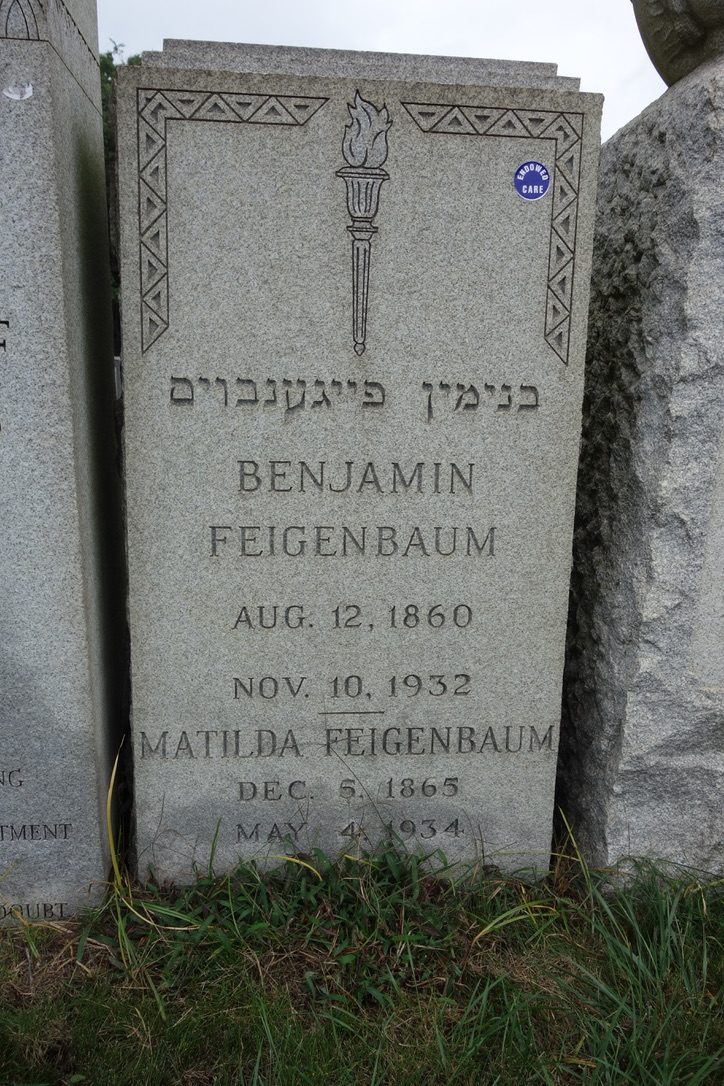
Benjamin Feigenbaum's gravestone in Mount Carmel Cemetery

Feigenbaum died on the morning of November 10, 1932, at the Home for Incurables in New York. He had been ill for the previous ten years, the last three of which he was paralyzed. Funeral services were held in Forward Hall, on November 13, 1932. Feigenbaum is currently buried in the Workmen's Circle section of Mount Carmel Cemetery, in Queens, New York.

== Written works ==
=== Authored ===
- כשר און טרפה [Kosher and Treyf]. New York: The Daily Forward. 1919.
- דיא רעליגיאן און דיא ארבייטער [Religion and the Worker]. New York. 1914.
- כשר און טרפה [Kosher and Treyf]. New York: The Free Thought. 1909.
- מעשי בראשית [Genesis]. New York: Hebrew Publishing Co. 1907.
- פון וואנען שטאמען די היינטיגע אידען?, אדער, אידישע מלוכות אין רוסלאנד און אראביען [Where are Jews from? Or, Jews in Russia and Arabia?]. London: Radical Publishing Company. 1907.
- דער רמב"ם [The Rambam]. New York: International Library Publishing Co. 1903.
- שטיינער וואס פאלען פון הימעל : א פאפולערע ערקלעהרונג וועגען מעטעאריטען, שטערנשנופפען און קאמעטען [Stones that descend from Heaven: A popular exploration of meteorites, strollers and comets]. Warsaw: Progress Publishing House. 1901.
- דארוויניזמוס [Darwinism]. Warsaw: Progress Publishing House. 1901.
- אידישקייט און סאציאליזמוס : אין צוויי טיילען [Judaism and Socialism: Two parts]. Warsaw: Progress Publishing House. 1901.

=== Translated ===
- Engels, Friedrich (1918). דיא פאמיליע : אמאל און היינט [The Origin of the Family]. Translated by Feigenbaum. New York: The Daily Forward.

== See also ==
- Yiddish literature
- Yiddishist movement
- History of the socialist movement in the United States
- Jewish views and involvement in US politics
