= United Leather Workers' International Union =

The United Leather Workers' International Union (ULWIU) was a labor union representing workers involved in tanning and making leather goods in the United States and Canada.

The union was founded in Indianapolis in April 1917. It brought together the International United Brotherhood of Leather Workers on Horse Goods, the Travelers' Goods and Leather Workers' International Union, and various local unions which had formerly been part of the Amalgamated Leather Workers of America. On July 24, it was chartered by the American Federation of Labor.

In 1923, the International Pocketbook Workers' Union affiliated to the ULWIU, but in 1937 it split away again, as the International Ladies' Handbag, Pocketbook and Novelty Workers' Union. By 1925, the union had 2,000 members, growing to 3,500 in 1950. By this time, the union's president, Bernard Quinn, wished to retire, and the union's members felt that, as it represented only a small part of the tanning industry, and the union was short of resources, it should merge into a larger union. On September 24, 1951, it merged into the Amalgamated Meat Cutters and Butcher Workmen of North America, retaining a semi-autonomous status, while the larger union took on four or five of the union's organizers.
