= Edmund Seidel =

American politician

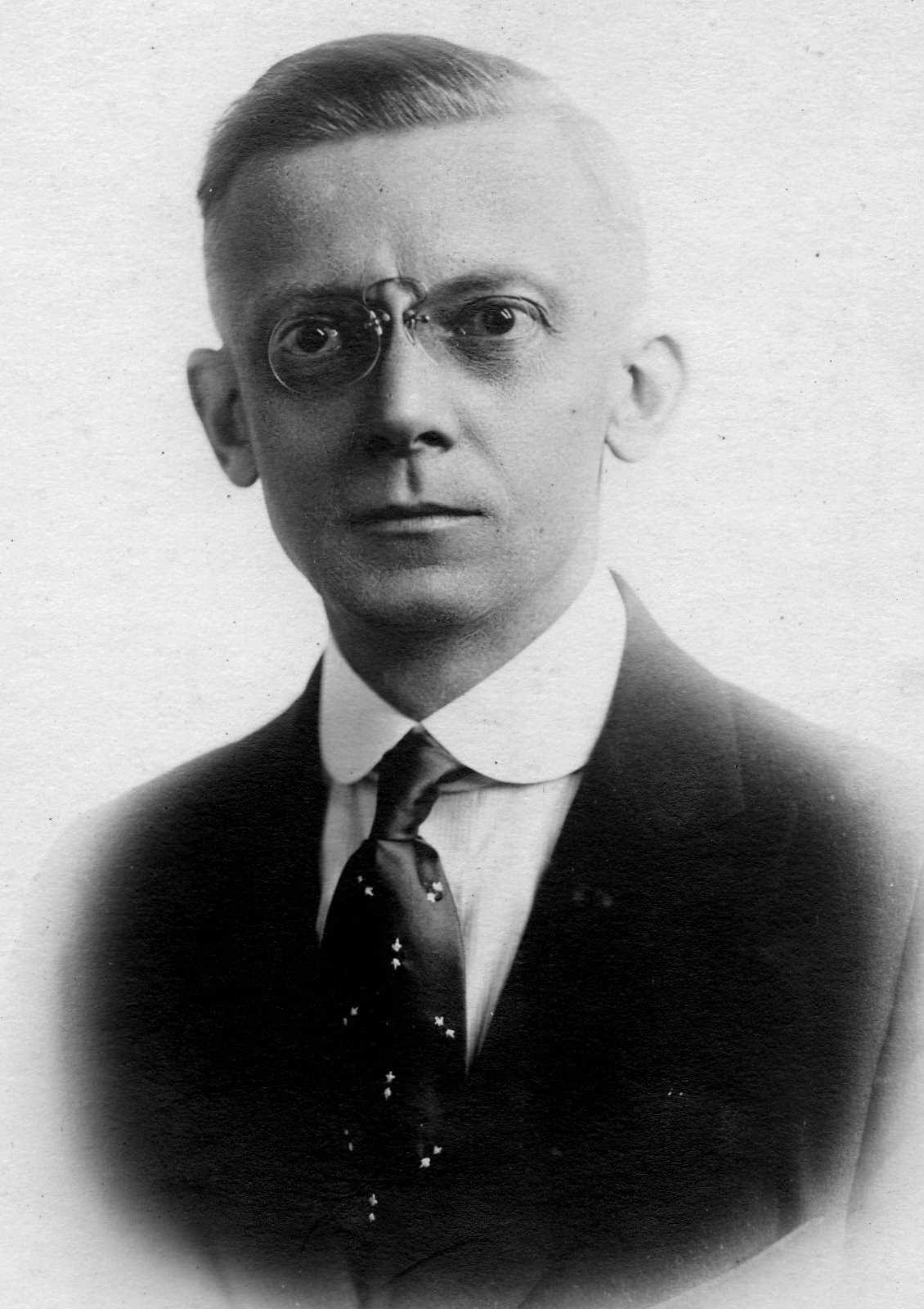
- Seidel c. 1922

Member of the New York Senate from the 22nd district
- In office January 1, 1921 – December 31, 1922
- Preceded by: Peter A. Abeles
- Succeeded by: Benjamin Antin

Personal details
- Born: July 10, 1878 German Empire
- Died: July 31, 1934 (aged 56) New York City, U.S.
- Party: Socialist Labor (before 1920); Socialist (after 1920)
- Occupation: Newspaper editor, politician
- Known for: First Socialist elected to the New York State Senate

Edmund Seidel (July 10, 1878 – July 31, 1934) was a German-American newspaper editor and politician from New York who served as the first Socialist member of the New York State Senate from 1921 to 1922.

== Life ==
Seidel was born in the German Empire and emigrated with his family to the United States in 1882. He attended the common schools in Philadelphia.

He ran on the Socialist Labor ticket for the New York Court of Appeals in the 1908, 1912 and 1914 state elections; and for Mayor of New York City in the 1917 New York City mayoral election. After the death of Daniel DeLeon in 1914, Seidel became the chief editor of the official Socialist Labor newspaper The People, but was ousted in 1918 for advocating a merger with the Socialist Party.

Seidel eventually joined the Socialist Party and was elected a member of the New York State Senate on the Socialist ticket in 1920, representing the 22nd district in the 144th and 145th New York State Legislatures. In 1921, he ran unsuccessfully for Borough President of the Bronx, and in 1927 he ran unsuccessfully for the Board of Aldermen.

== Sources ==
- New York Red Book (1922; pg. 80)
- PETITIONS ALL FILED; 4 PARTIES IN FIELD in NYT on August 21, 1921
- Others by Darcy G. Richardson (Vol. IV, pg. 110f)

New York State Senate
Preceded by Peter A. Abeles	New York State Senate; 22nd District; 1921–1922	Succeeded by Benjamin Antin
