= Abraham I. Shiplacoff =

American politician (1877–1934)

Abraham Shiplacoff
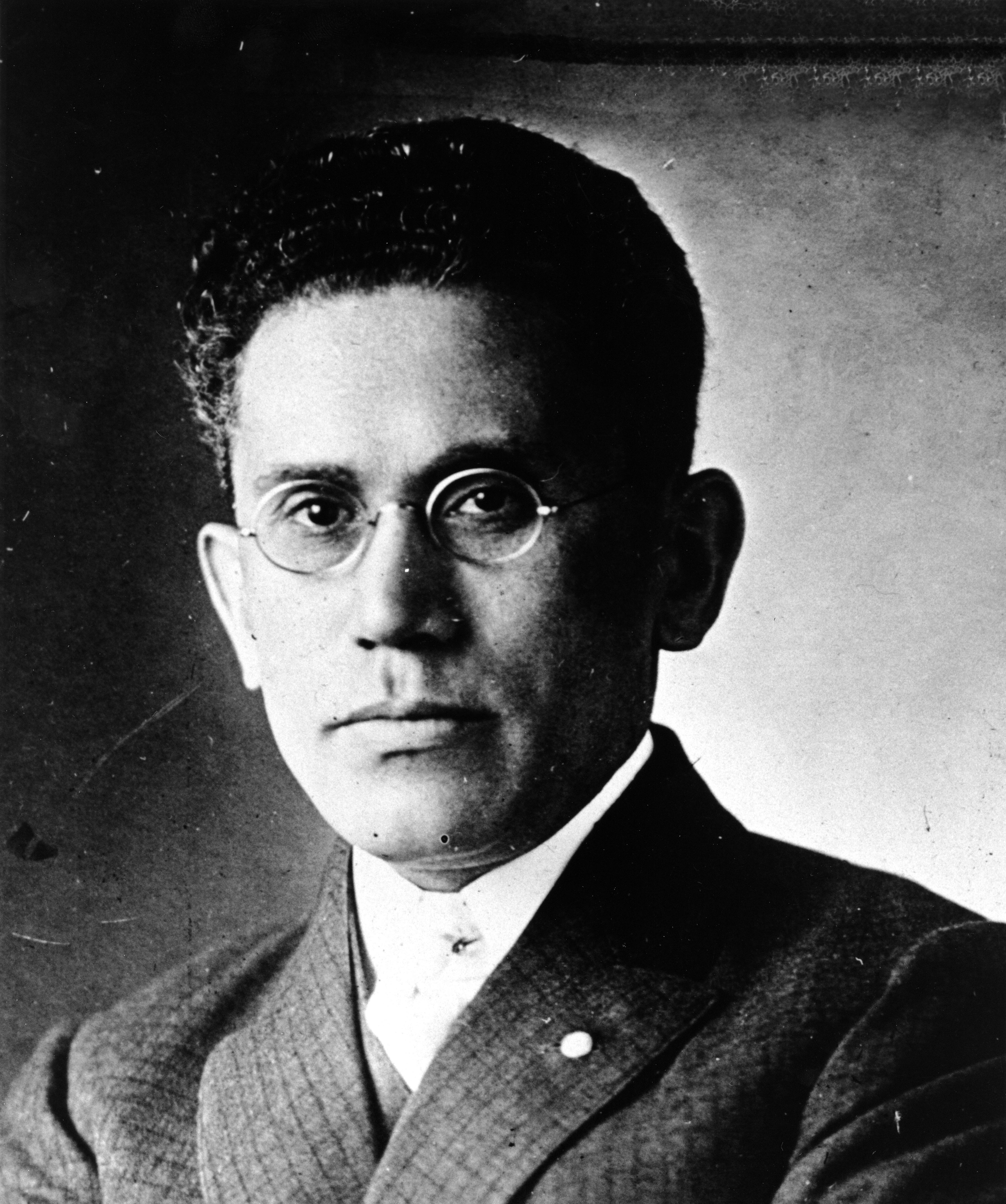
- Shiplacoff c. 1917

President of the International Pocketbook Workers' Union
- In office c. November 1927 – c. March 1930

Secretary-Treasurer of the United Hebrew Trades
- In office c. May 1915 – c. January 1916
- Preceded by: Bernard Weinstein
- Succeeded by: Max Pine

Member of the New York State Assembly from the 23rd Kings district
- In office January 1, 1916 – December 31, 1918
- Preceded by: William F. Mathewson
- Succeeded by: Charles Solomon

Member of the New York City Board of Aldermen from the 59th district
- In office January 1, 1920 – December 31, 1921
- Preceded by: Barnet Wolff
- Succeeded by: James J. Morris

Personal details
- Born: December 13, 1877 Chernigov, Kiev Governorate, Russian Empire
- Died: February 7, 1934 (aged 56) New York City, New York, U.S.
- Party: Socialist
- Spouse: Henrietta Zwickel
- Children: 3
- Occupation: Garment worker; Schoolteacher; Clerk; Journalist; Labor leader; Politician
- Known for: Prosecution under the Espionage Act of 1917
- Nickname(s): "Abe" "The Jewish Debs"

Abraham Isaac "Abe" Shiplacoff (December 13, 1877 – February 7, 1934) was a Ukrainian-born Jewish-American trade union organizer, educator, journalist and politician. Considered the "Jewish Debs," Shiplacoff is best remembered as a Socialist New York assemblyman and as a prominent target of prosecution for sedition under the Espionage Act in 1918.

== Biography ==
=== Early years ===
Abraham I. Shiplacoff was born on December 13, 1877, in Chernigov, Ukraine, then part of the Russian Empire. He emigrated to the United States in 1891, settling in New York City.

=== Political career ===
In 1893, the 16-year-old Shiplacoff joined his first political organization, a socialist group known as "The Voice of Labor".

Early in 1915, Shiplacoff was named Secretary of the United Hebrew Trades, a municipal trade union federation based in New York City.

He was also active in Jewish causes during the second decade of the 20th century. For instance, in September 1915, the National Workmen's Committee on Jewish Rights held a meeting at Cooper Union to advocate for Jewish emancipation in Russia. Shiplacoff chaired the meeting, which resolved to ask U.S. President Woodrow Wilson to demand that Russia grant equal rights to its Jewish citizens at the end of World War I.

Shiplacoff was active in the Socialist Sunday School movement. For a time he was the labor editor of The Jewish Daily Forward.

=== 1916 legislative session ===
In 1915, Shiplacoff became—after Herbert M. Merrill—the second candidate of the Socialist Party elected to the New York State Assembly, He was a member of the 139th, 140th and 141st New York State Legislatures from the 23rd District of Kings County, representing Brownsville, Brooklyn.

Shiplacoff found his first experience in as the sole Socialist member of the Assembly to be trying, as he recalled in 1916:

Quite early in the session I realized that the chance for having any of my bills voted out of committee and presented on the floor of the Assembly were very scarce. This was not the result of any antagonistic feeling toward the 'lone red,' but almost entirely due to the fact that I was not open for bargaining; for the success or failure of getting one's bill out of a committee depends mainly on one's willingness to exchange courtesies... Having no concessions to make [in trading votes], I had no hopes of getting any in return.

Shiplacoff therefore contented himself with what he described as "putting up a fight against the bills which were opposed to the interests of labor, or were otherwise of a vicious nature". Chief among these were a series of bills intended to exempt dairy workers from existing laws mandating one rest day in seven, which appeared approximately a dozen times before ultimately being passed in a watered-down form. Shiplacoff was also the single assemblyman opposed to the 1916 Slater-Welsh bill, which established compulsory military training in New York State for unemployed boys between the ages of 16 and 19.

Among the legislation proposed by Shiplacoff during this inaugural session were bills which would have required any employer placing an ad offering jobs during a strike to make that fact clear in the advertisement, tightening regulations for exits on any factory building over one story in height, banning the use of armed guards during strikes, provision of compensation for workers suffering permanent disabilities on the job, and prohibition of the employment of children under 16 years of age in a factory. All of these bills died in committee. During his first two terms in the Assembly, Shiplacoff managed to introduce only one successful bill, which banned the use of the third degree in interrogation.

=== 1917 legislative session ===
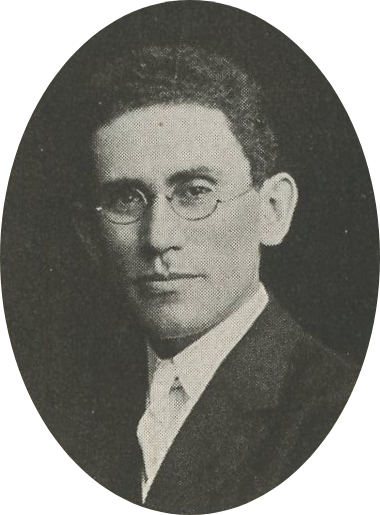
Shiplacoff's official State Assembly portrait, 1917

Shiplacoff won re-election to the assembly in 1916 (when he was joined by fellow socialist Joseph A. Whitehorn) and 1917 (9 other socialists were also elected at this time).

During the 1917 session, Shiplacoff introduced New York's first birth control bill, which would have allowed "the dissemination of printed articles describing means of birth control". He introduced the bill on January 24, while Margaret Sanger's sister Ethel Byrne was on a hunger strike in The Tombs to protest her arrest for distributing information about birth control from their clinic in Brooklyn.

Shiplacoff did have occasional successes in the Assembly, although they were often more symbolic than substantive. For instance, on March 26, 1917, Joseph M. Callahan introduced a resolution urging the United States Congress to pass a measure, known as the Chamberlain bill, requiring the United States to prepare for entry into World War I. Shiplacoff objected on the procedural grounds that Assembly rules forbade resolutions to be introduced after March 1 except by the unanimous consent of the members, which caused the resolution to be returned to its proposer. The rules were amended, allowing the reintroduction of the resolution two days later. Supporters attacked Shiplacoff for his opposition, with Assemblyman Martin G. McCue saying that:

It's you and your kind which have changed my views on the subject of compulsory military service. We tried conscription to make you and your kind do your bit. If I believed as you do I would turn in my citizen papers and resign from the Assembly."

Shiplacoff replied:

You have no right to challenge my patriotism because I happen to disagree with you.

At this point, Lieutenant Colonel and Assemblyman Wells added:

Your kind of patriotism is the kind that a yellow dog has.

The resolution was then adopted, with only Shiplacoff and Whitehorn voting against it.

On May 3, 1917, Shiplacoff introduced a resolution to request Woodrow Wilson to reconsider his appointment of Elihu Root as head of the United States Commission to Russia. He was "hooted down by the members of the Assembly" and a motion was then introduced and "uproariously carried" that no mention of the resolution be made in the official journal.

=== 1918 legislative session ===
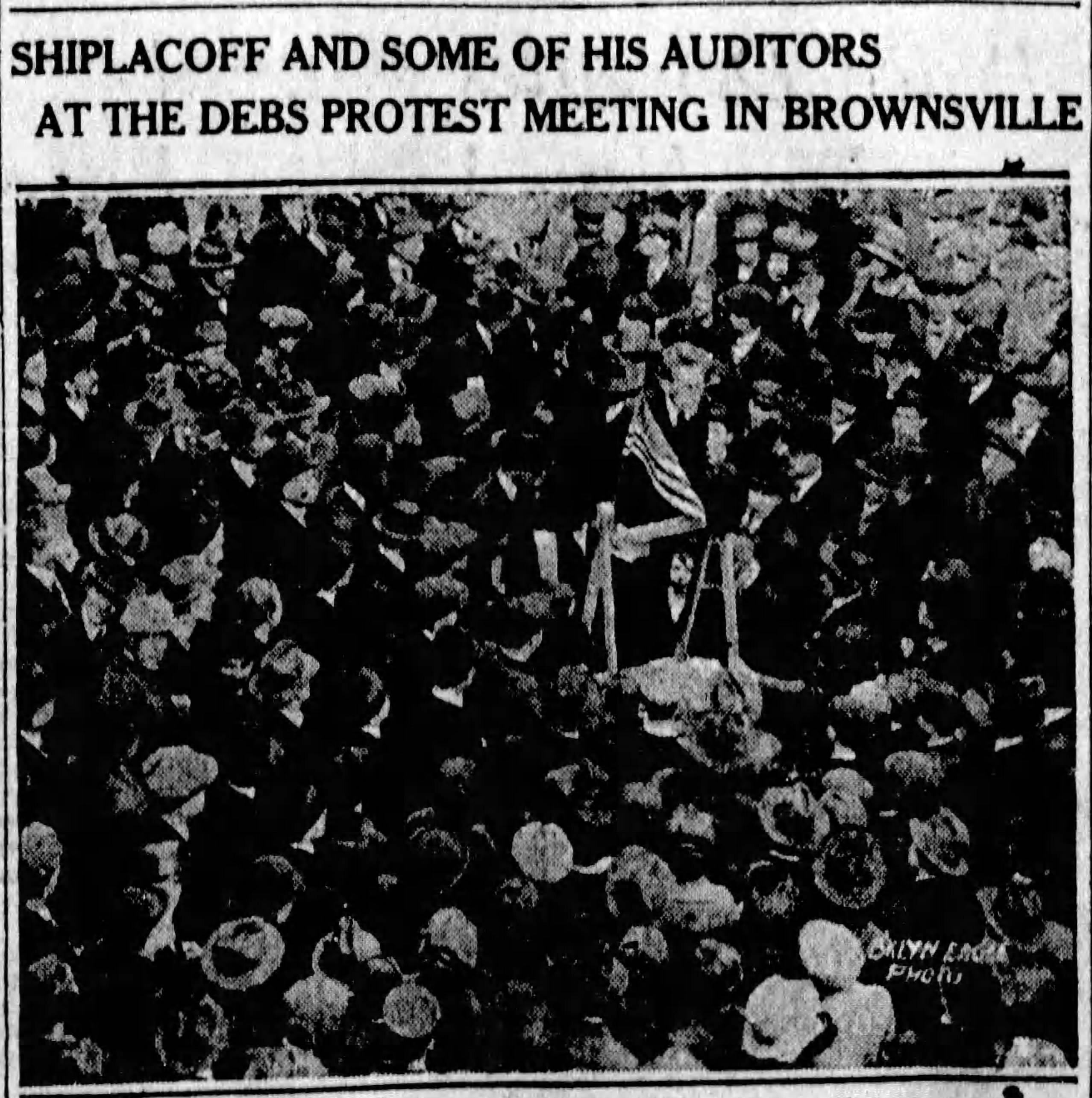
Shiplacoff speaking at a protest against the imprisonment of Eugene V. Debs, 1919

Shiplacoff became the leader of the Socialists in the State Assembly for the 1918 legislative session.

On February 11, 1918, Shiplacoff and his 9 socialist colleagues in the assembly refused to support a resolution of admiration for Abraham Lincoln because it included language expressing gratitude for American soldiers fighting in France. The Democratic Assemblyman who had introduced the resolution attacked Shiplacoff, stating:

Mr. Speaker, I have sat here long enough watching the tactics of some of the members of this House. As a true American I will refuse to sit here longer with members whose hearts are touched with treason. I come from the South, where the people sometimes take the law into their own hands. I do not approve of that, but when a man won't stand up for his country he is against it. If this thing happens again let the Lord have pity on their souls.

During the same session, Assemblyman George R. Fearon accused the socialists of preaching free love, to which Shiplacoff replied: "I am sure that if some of the Socialists preach free love, some of the Republicans practice it."

Shiplacoff was elected to the governing National Executive Committee of the Socialist Party in 1918, remaining in that post through the Emergency National Convention held in Chicago in 1919.

In the fall of 1918 Shiplacoff ran as a Socialist candidate for the United States House of Representatives, in part because he could not support his family on his Assembly salary. Because the Socialist Party had outpolled the Democrats (9228 to 8290) in the district's previous election, leading to the election of a Republican, Shiplacoff's candidacy led to calls for a Democratic-Republican "fusion candidate" to prevent his victory. The sitting Republican candidate, Reuben Haskell, offered to withdraw from the race should polls indicate that he had fewer votes than Democratic candidate George W. Martin. The plan was never put into action, however. Haskell did not withdraw and defeated Shiplacoff and Martin in November 1918.

=== 1918 prosecution ===
And I call particularly tonight upon the young men and women who have had the good fortune of being born in this country, who have had the good fortune of getting even a smattering of the history of this country, to put themselves for one moment in the position of those people (the Bolsheviki) about whom this meeting is held tonight. Let us for a moment imagine that during the struggle of America against the autocracy of England in 1776, let us imagine for one moment that any other European country or American country had come and tried to interfere in our effort to straighten out matters for ourselves the best way our forefathers in this country knew how. You well remember with what bitter feelings your teachers have tried to plant in you a sort of hatred against the Hessians, those soldiers who came from the other side, hired to do the work of King George III against the American Colonists, and those were only the ragtag of the people; they were the hired murderers who came here to do the bidding of King George III; think how much more bitter the Russian people today have a right to feel against people who, in the name of democracy, in the name of everything that seems to be sacred, come there and hand out the same dose to Russia today which was handed out by the Hessians to the American Republic.

— From the speech which formed the basis for Shiplacoff's 1918 indictment

On September 23, 1918, Shiplacoff was indicted for three counts of violation of the so-called Espionage Act for a speech against American intervention in Russia made in the Bronx 10 days previously. The first count charged that Shiplacoff "willfully, knowingly, and feloniously uttered and published disloyal, scurrilous, and abusive language about the military and naval forces of the United States, namely the armed forces of the United States now operating in Siberia". The second count charged that his words were "intended to bring [those forces] into contempt, scorn, contumely, and disrepute". The third count charged that his speech was intended to incite and encourage resistance to American forces. Shiplacoff was released on $5,000 bail.

The indictment against Shiplacoff, along with similar charges against John Reed, William J. Robinson, and others, was quashed on April 4, 1919. Attorney General Alexander Palmer had decided that the 1918 end of the First World War obviated most such prosecutions.

=== Later political career ===
Shiplacoff remained a loyal member of the Socialist Party after its 1919 split into rival Socialist and Communist organizations.

He was a New York City alderman from 1920 to 1921. In February 1920, he spoke out against the Treaty of Versailles and against the New York State Assembly's recent suspension of its Socialist members. He stated that the Assemblymen who had voted to suspend the Socialists were "poor boobs", and that his colleagues on the New York City Board of Aldermen were "a bunch of hypocrites". About Woodrow Wilson, in reference to the treaty, he said that "the little tin god in the White House has collapsed." He made some remarks on the injustice of the treaty, which led to rumors in the press that the Board of Aldermen might investigate and punish him for what they reportedly saw as pro-Germanism.

By early 1920, Shiplacoff was the manager of the New York office of the Amalgamated Clothing Workers of America. In March 1923, Marks Arnheim, a New York City clothing manufacturer attempted to have the ACWA and its New York Joint Board dissolved as "unlawful combinations and conspiracies" which had "the intent and purpose generally of destroying the present industrial system of ownership by private persons, firms, and corporations." As part of this suit, Shiplacoff, along with Sidney Hillman and other union officials, was interrogated by attorneys for Marks Arnheim.

Shiplacoff served as President of the International Pocketbook Workers' Union from 1927 to 1930.

Shiplacoff was defeated for re-election to the Board of Aldermen in 1921. In 1923, he was elected a delegate to the SPA's National Convention. The same year, he ran once again for the Board of Aldermen in the 50th district. His candidacy was endorsed by the Citizens Union, but he ultimately lost the Democratic candidate. He made several more unsuccessful bids for Congress in 1926, 1928, 1930, and 1932, for State Assembly in 1922 and 1931, and for Brooklyn Borough President in 1929.

At the 1924 New York State convention of the SPA, Shiplacoff was one of only 5 delegates to oppose the successful motion to endorse Robert M. La Follette's candidacy for president of the United States. About the party's endorsement, Shiplacoff told the New York Times that "the Socialist Party hasn't married La Follette, the Socialist Party has married a labor party. La Follette is only a sort of father-in-law."

=== Death and legacy ===
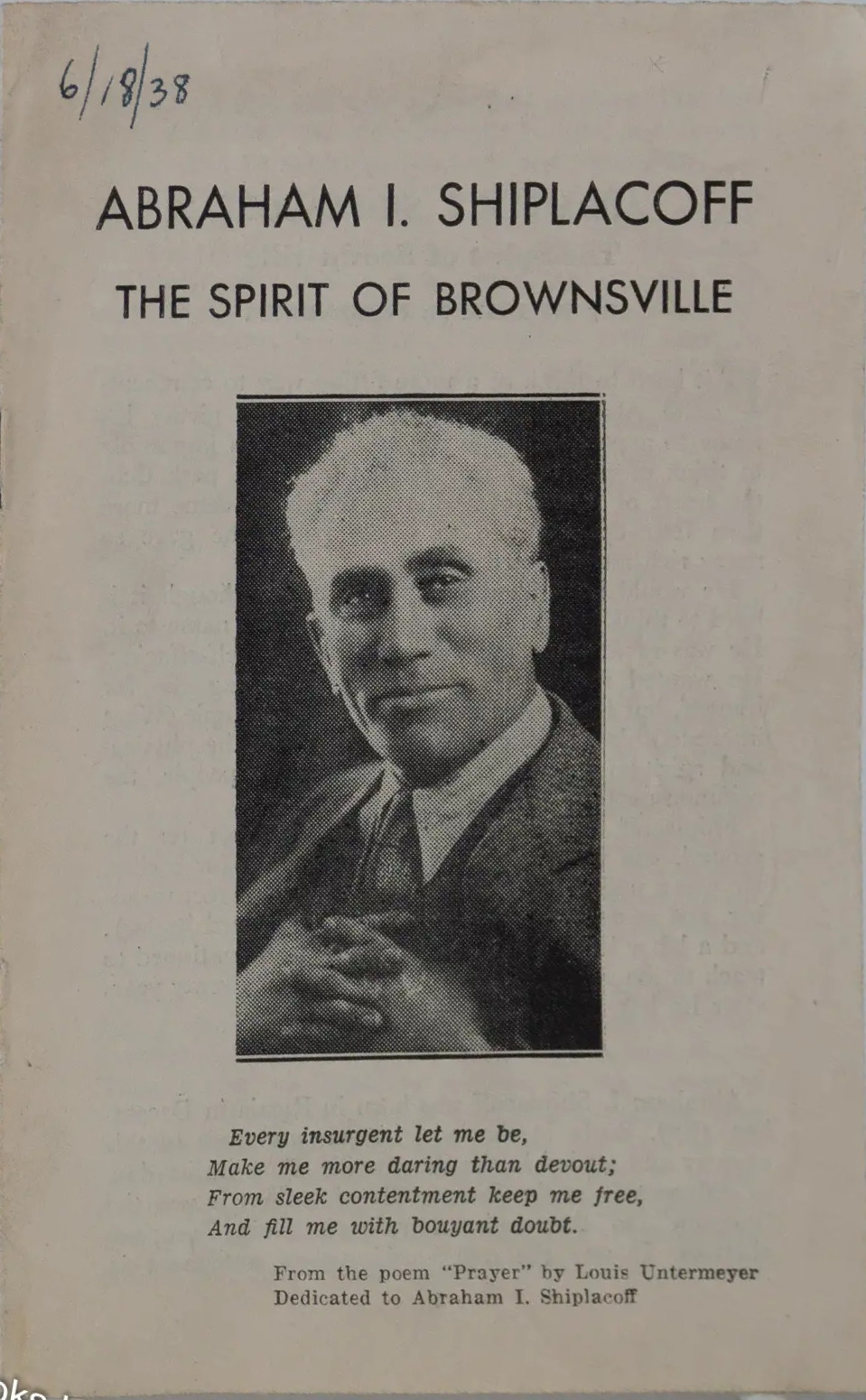
Abraham I. Shiplacoff, the Spirit of Brownsville, a pamphlet published by the Rand School Press, 1938

Abraham Shiplacoff died of uremic poisoning on February 7, 1934, in Israel Zion Hospital in Brooklyn, New York. He was 56 years old at the time of his death.

Shiplacoff's papers are held by the Tamiment Library and Robert F. Wagner Archives of New York University. The collection, gathered in six archival boxes measuring 3 linear feet, is open for research without restriction.

== Works ==
- מיין ארבייט אין דער אסעמבלי (Mayn arbeyṭ in der asembli — My Work in the Assembly). New York: Ferlag fun der Idisher SP Federatsyon, 1916.

New York State Assembly
Preceded by Nathan B. Finkelstein	New York State Assembly; Kings County, 23rd District; 1916-1918	Succeeded by B. Elliot Burston
