= International Leather Goods, Plastic and Novelty Workers' Union =

The International Leather Goods, Plastic and Novelty Workers' Union (ILGPNWU) was a trade union representing workers involved in making bags, belts and similar goods, in the United States and Canada.

The union originated in 1915, as a local of the Travelers' Goods and Leather Novelty Workers' Union, based in New York City. In 1916, it led an unsuccessful strike, and became moribund, but it was relaunched the following year as an independent union. It proved successful, and gradually expanded, becoming the International Pocketbook Workers' Union in 1923. That year, it applied for a charter from the American Federation of Labor (AFL), but was rejected on the grounds that the United Leather Workers' International Union (ULWIU) already had jurisdiction over the trade. However, the ULWIU did not organise any workers in the field, and in 1926 it agreed to affiliate the Pocketbook Workers as an autonomous union. By this point, the union had 6,000 members.

On March 5, 1937, the union became independent of the ULWIU, receiving an AFL charter as the International Ladies' Handbag, Pocketbook and Novelty Workers' Union. It renamed itself in 1942 as the International Ladies' Handbag, Luggage, Belt and Novelty Workers' Union, dropping "Ladies" from its name in 1946, and becoming the ILGPNWU in 1955. That year, it affiliated to the new AFL–CIO. By 1957, it had grown to have 31,700 members, falling slightly to 27,000 in 1980.

In 1992, the union renamed itself as the International Leather Goods, Plastics, Novelty and Service Workers' Union. On May 1, 1996, it merged into the Service Employees' International Union.

== Presidents ==
Isidor Laderman
Samuel Reinlib
1972: Ben Feldman
1970s: Frank Casale
1982: Ralph Cennamo
1985: Domenic DiPaola
1992: Andrew McKenzie
