= Herbert M. Merrill =

American politician

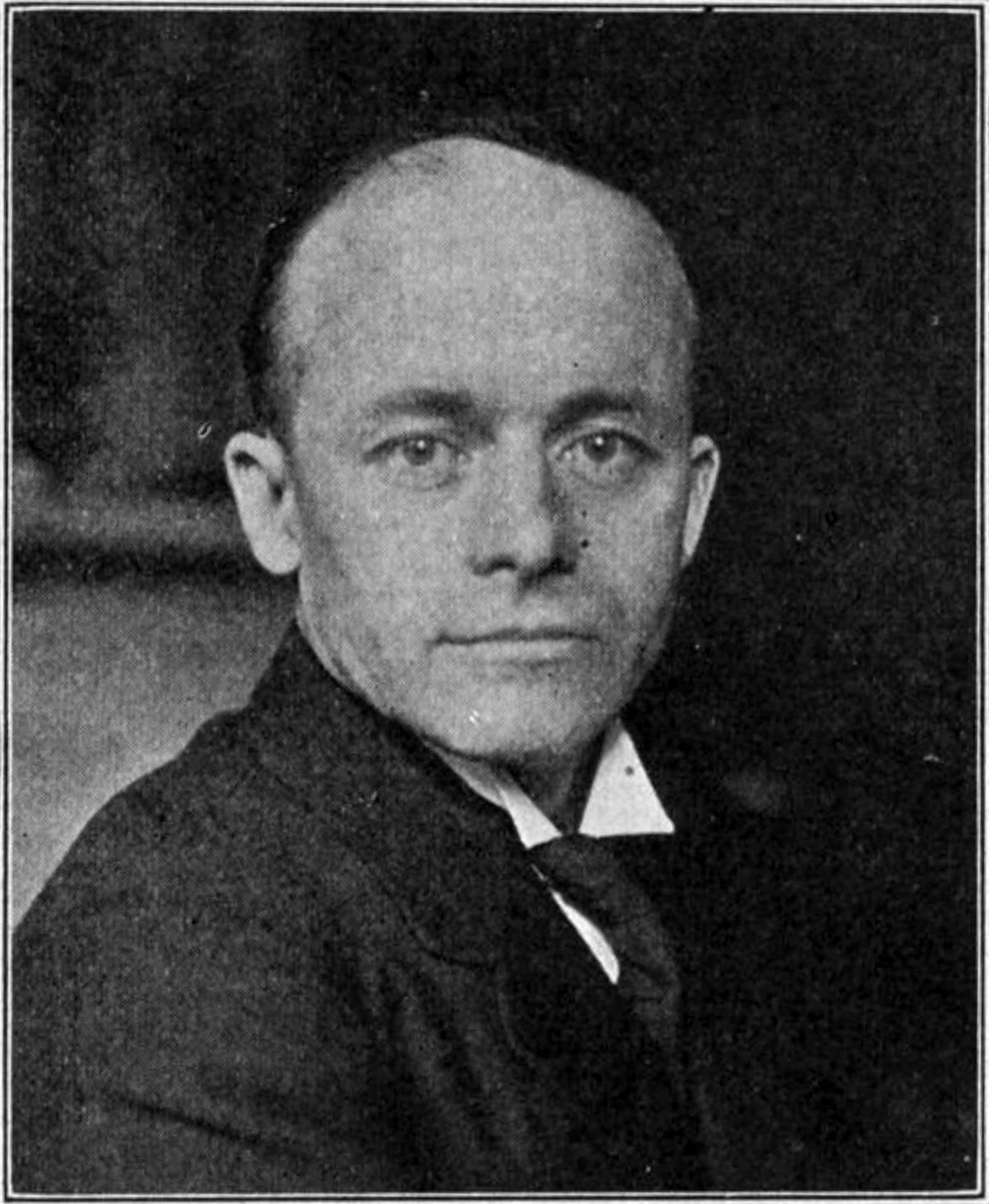
- Merrill c. 1912

Member of the New York State Assembly from the Schenectady district
- In office January 1, 1912 – December 31, 1912
- Preceded by: John C. Myers
- Succeeded by: Arthur Porter Squire

Personal details
- Born: September 13, 1871 Campton, New Hampshire, U.S.
- Died: March 5, 1956 (aged 84) Schenectady, New York, U.S.
- Party: Socialist (before 1936); American Labor (1936–1944); Liberal (after 1944)
- Other political affiliations: Social Democratic Federation (after 1936)
- Occupation: Electrical worker, politician
- Known for: First Socialist elected to the New York State Assembly

Herbert M. Merrill (September 13, 1871 – March 5, 1956 in Schenectady, New York) was an American electrical worker and politician from New York. He was the first Socialist member of the New York State Assembly.

== Life ==
He attended the common schools in Boston, Massachusetts, and graduated from Plymouth High School (New Hampshire) in 1888. Then he went to work as an armature winder at the General Electric plant in Schenectady. He was a founder of Local No. 247 of the Electrical Workers Union. Through all his life, he was an avid reader, and was considered by Dixon Ryan Fox, President of Union College, the most widely read person of his time.

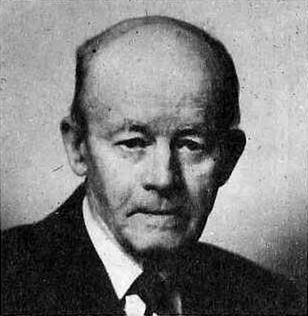
Merrill c. 1951

In November 1911, the Socialist Party of America won the elections in Schenectady County by pluralities, and Merrill was elected to the Assembly, sitting in the 135th New York State Legislature in 1912. Before and after this tenure, he was a candidate for office on the Socialist, American Labor and Liberal tickets, at many elections for more than thirty years. He was Secretary of the Socialist Party in the State of New York for about 15 years.

He died on March 5, 1956, in Ellis Hospital in Schenectady, New York; and was buried at the Blair Cemetery in Campton, New Hampshire.

== Sources ==
- Official New York from Cleveland to Hughes by Charles Elliott Fitch (Hurd Publishing Co., New York and Buffalo, 1911, Vol. IV; pg. 347, 349, 351f, 354, 356f and 359)
- LUNN LOSES SCHENECTADY in NYT on November 5, 1913
- HERBERT MERRILL DIES; Ex-Assemblyman Was Liberal and Socialist Party Leader in NYT on March 7, 1956 (subscription required)

New York State Assembly
Preceded by John C. Myers	New York State Assembly; Schenectady County; 1912	Succeeded by Arthur Porter Squire
