= Barnet Wolff =

American socialist politician

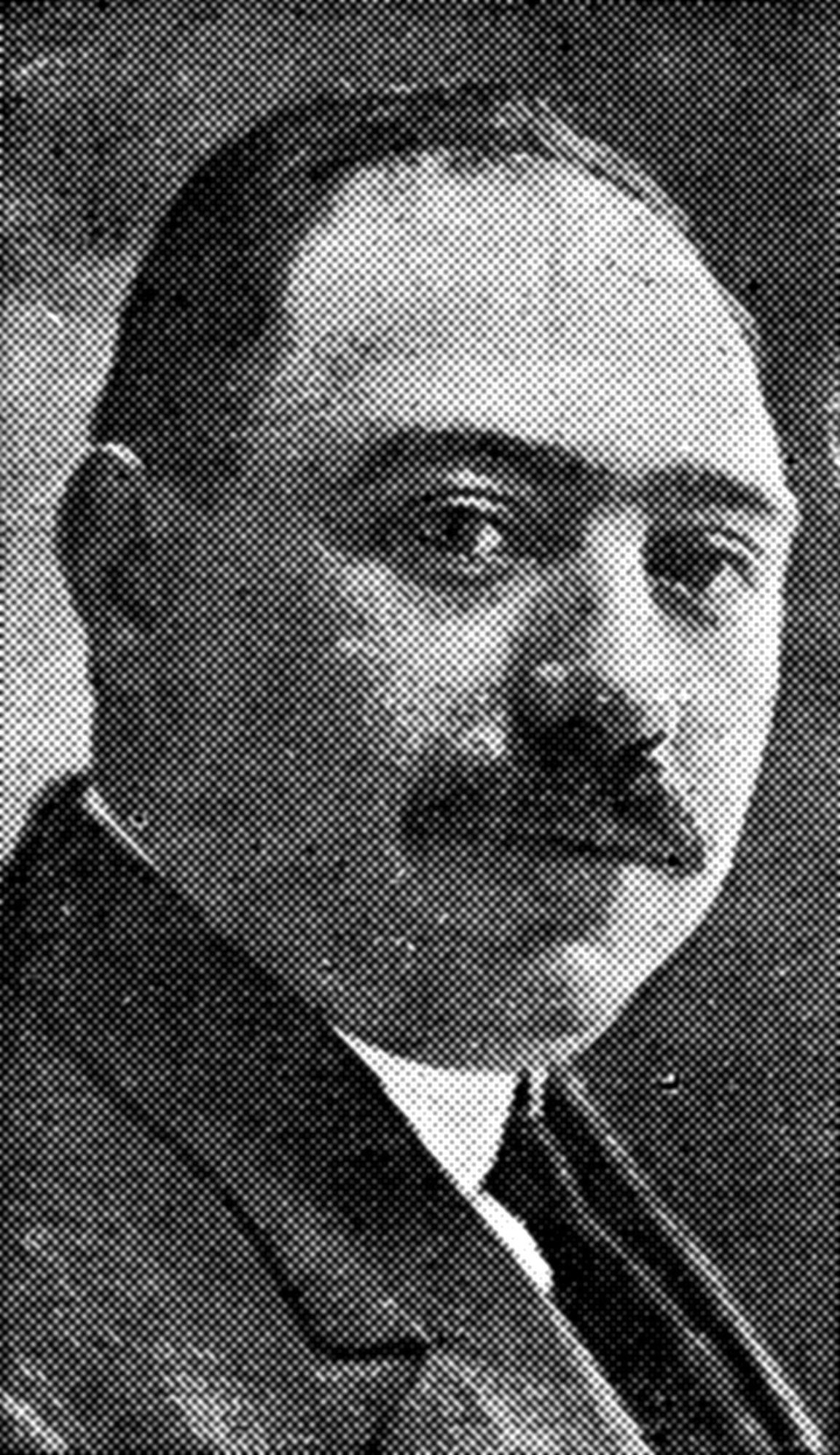
- Wolff c. 1917

Member of the New York City Board of Aldermen from the 59th district
- In office January 1, 1918 – December 31, 1919
- Succeeded by: Abraham Shiplacoff

Personal details
- Born: November 26, 1878 France
- Died: August 15, 1944 (aged 65) New York City, U.S.
- Resting place: Mount Carmel Cemetery
- Party: Socialist
- Spouse: Ella Nislowski
- Children: Walter; Robert; Benjamin; Rosabelle
- Occupation: Politician, labor leader

Barnet Wolff (November 26, 1878 – August 15, 1944) was a French-born American labor leader and politician who served as a Socialist member of the New York City Board of Aldermen, representing Brooklyn's 59th district from 1918 to 1919.

After he left office, he became manager of the International Pocketbook Workers' Union, vice chairman and treasurer of the Workmen's Circle, and director of the Circle's sanitarium in Liberty, New York. He died at his home in Queens, New York on August 15, 1944.
