= Abraham Beckerman =

American socialist politician

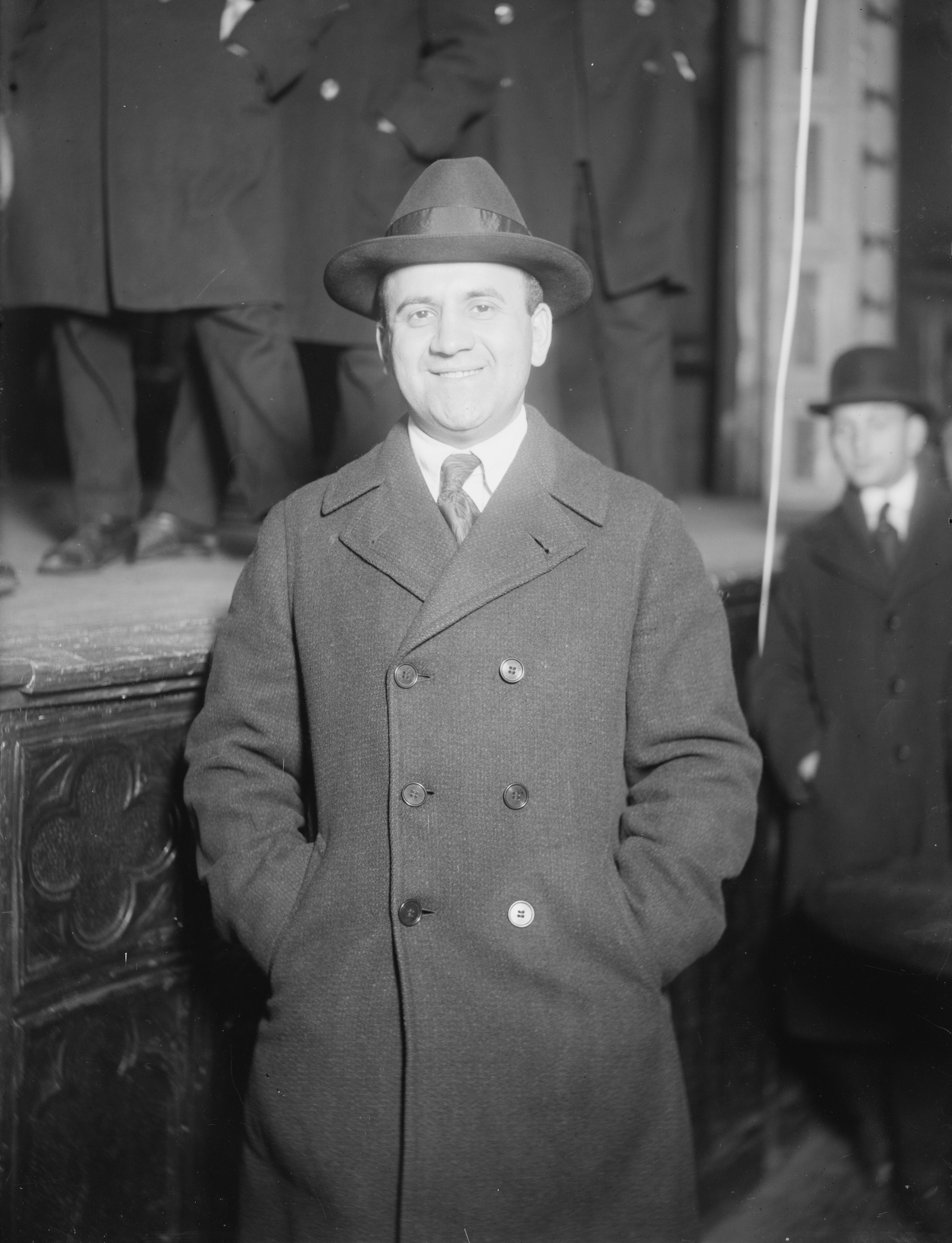
- Beckerman in 1920

Member of the New York City Board of Aldermen from the 6th district
- In office January 1, 1918 – December 31, 1921

Personal details
- Born: September 27, 1890 London, England, U.K.
- Died: July 31, 1964 (aged 73) Miami Beach, Florida, U.S.
- Party: Socialist
- Spouse: Anna Berman (m. 1921)
- Children: Ruth; Joan
- Occupation: Politician

Abraham Beckerman (September 27, 1890 – July 31, 1964) was an English-born American labor leader, politician and convicted criminal. In 1937, he was found guilty of racketeering for using his position as general manager of the Fur Dressers Factor Corporation to aid mobsters Jacob "Gurrah" Shapiro and Louis "Lepke" Buchalter in a conspiracy to control the $75 million fur-dressing industry.

He was previously a Socialist Party politician, representing Manhattan's 6th district on the New York City Board of Aldermen from 1918 to 1921. After he left office, he became general manager of the New York Joint Board of the Amalgamated Clothing Workers of America. During his tenure, Beckerman fought to rid the unions of Communist influence with what former colleague Baruch Charney Vladeck dubbed "Beckerman's knuckles."
