= Alexander Braunstein (politician) =

American socialist politician

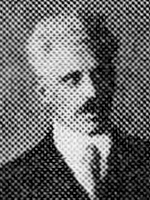
- Braunstein in 1917

Member of the New York City Board of Aldermen from the 32nd district
- In office January 1, 1918 – December 31, 1921

Personal details
- Born: February 24, 1868 Caucasus Viceroyalty, Russian Empire
- Died: June 24, 1928 (aged 60) Yonkers, New York, U.S.
- Resting place: Mount Hebron Cemetery
- Party: Socialist
- Spouse: Rose
- Children: Walter; Leon
- Occupation: Pharmacist, educator, politician

Alexander Braunstein (February 24, 1868 – June 24, 1928) was a Caucasian-born Jewish-American pharmacist, educator and politician who served as a Socialist member of the New York City Board of Aldermen, representing The Bronx's 32nd district from 1918 to 1921.

Braunstein was a delegate to the 1919 Emergency National Convention of the SPA, where he was allied with the Old Guard faction. After he left office, he became a pharmacist and taught economics at the New York University School of Commerce. He died at his pharmacy in Yonkers, New York on June 24, 1928.
