= Maurice Calman =

American socialist politician

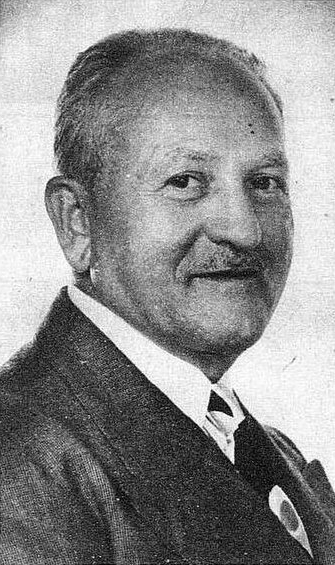
- Calman c. 1947

Member of the New York City Board of Aldermen from the 20th district
- In office January 1, 1918 – December 31, 1919

Personal details
- Born: January 15, 1887 Roman, Kingdom of Romania
- Died: January 27, 1970 (aged 83) Glen Rock, New Jersey, U.S.
- Party: Socialist; Liberal
- Spouse: Sarah Braunstein
- Children: Sylvia; Annette; Clarence
- Occupation: Politician, dentist

Maurice Samuel Calman (January 15, 1887 – January 27, 1970) was a Romanian-born American politician and dentist who served as a Socialist member of the New York City Board of Aldermen, representing Manhattan's 20th district from 1918 to 1919.

Calman later became active in the Liberal Party of New York, running for State Senate in 1947. He died at his sons' home in Glen Rock, New Jersey on January 27, 1970.
