= Charles B. Garfinkel =

American politician

Charles Bernhard Garfinkel
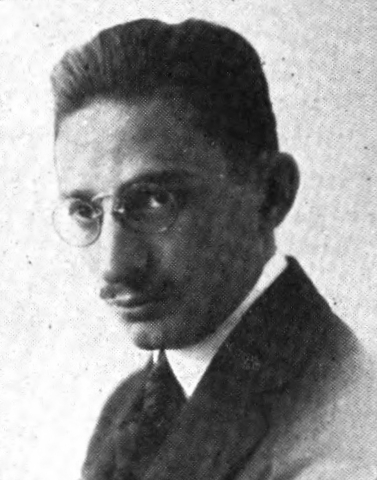
- Garfinkel c. 1918

Member of the New York State Assembly from the 5th Bronx district
- In office January 1, 1918 – December 31, 1918
- Preceded by: Constituency established
- Succeeded by: William S. Evans

Personal details
- Born: Charles Bernhard Garfinkel; December 25, 1890 Derazhnia, Podolia Governorate, Russian Empire
- Died: September 9, 1969 (aged 78) Miami, Florida, U.S.
- Party: Socialist
- Occupation: Salesman, insurance agent, politician

Charles Bernhard Garfinkel (December 25, 1890 – September 9, 1969) was a Ukrainian-American salesman, insurance agent and politician from New York.

== Life ==
He was born on December 25, 1890, in Derazhnia, Russian Empire, the youngest of eight children of a lawyer who died a year after Charles's birth. His mother emigrated with the children to the United States in 1897. He became a salesman of print paper and an insurance agent, and lived in the Bronx.

Garfinkel was a member of the Socialist Party of America. In November 1917, he was elected to the New York State Assembly (Bronx Co., 5th D.), defeating the incumbent Democrat William S. Evans. Garfinkel was one of ten Socialist members of the 141st New York State Legislature in 1918. He introduced one of the earliest rent control bills, but it did not pass the committee stage. The Citizens Union said that Garfinkel was "very attentive and made an excellent record of votes on city bills". In November 1918, he ran for re-election, but was defeated by his Democratic predecessor Evans who had been endorsed by the Republicans.

In 1934, he ran for Congress in the 22nd District, but was defeated by the incumbent Democrat Anthony J. Griffin.

In December 1935, after the expulsion of the Old Guard faction, Garfinkel was elected by the New York City Central Committee of the Socialist Party as Temporary Chairman.

In November 1936, he ran for the New York State Senate (23rd D.) but was defeated by the incumbent Democrat John J. Dunnigan.

He died in September 9, 1969.

New York State Assembly
Preceded by new district	New York State Assembly; Bronx County, 5th District; 1918	Succeeded by William S. Evans
