= William Karlin =

American politician

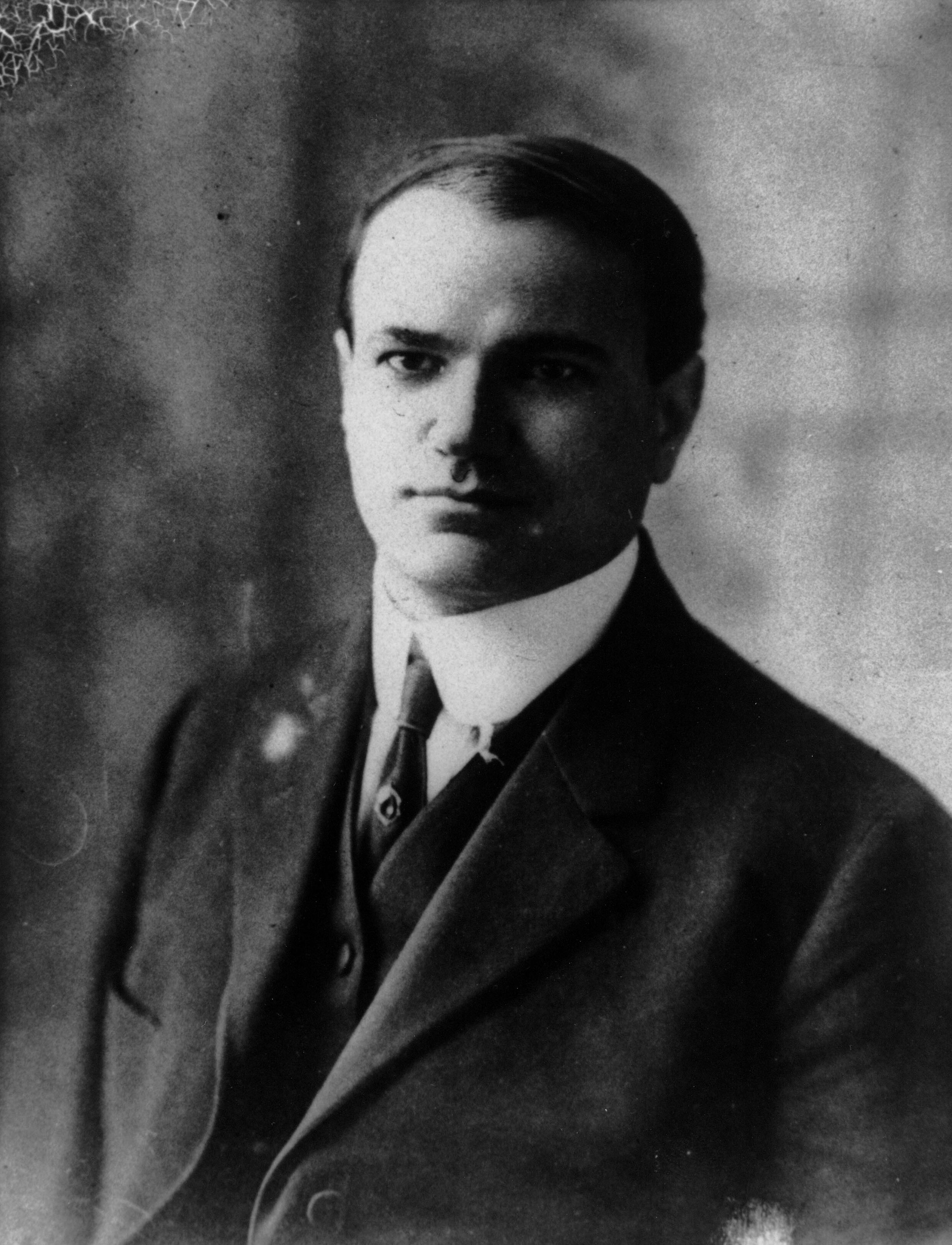
- Karlin c. 1917

Member of the New York State Assembly from the 4th New York district
- In office January 1, 1918 – December 31, 1918
- Preceded by: Henry S. Schimmel
- Succeeded by: Samuel Dickstein

Personal details
- Born: March 29, 1882 Russian Empire
- Died: December 6, 1944 (aged 62) New York City, U.S.
- Party: Socialist (before 1936); American Labor (1936–1944); Liberal (after 1944)
- Other political affiliations: Social Democratic Federation (after 1936)
- Education: New York University School of Law
- Occupation: Labor leader, politician

William Karlin (March 29, 1882 – December 6, 1944) was a Jewish-American labor leader and politician from New York.

== Life ==
He was born in the Russian Empire, the son of Samuel Karlin and Rose Karlin. The family emigrated to the United States, and settled in New York City. He attended the public schools and was licensed as a pharmacist in 1901. He studied law at New York University School of Law from 1906 to 1908, was admitted to the bar, and practiced in New York City.

Karlin joined the Socialist Party of America in 1912 and became a candidate for the New York State Assembly that same year.

On November 10, 1917, he married Ida Beck (died 1972).

In 1918 Karlin won election to the 141st New York State Legislature as a Socialist from the 4th Assembly District, serving a two year term.

In 1920, he appeared as counsel for the five suspended Socialist members of the 143rd New York State Legislature during their trial for fitness to take their seats, which ended with their expulsion.

In 1922, Karlin ran for Congress in the 20th District, but was defeated by Republican Fiorello La Guardia.

Karlin ran unsuccessfully on the Socialist ticket for New York Attorney General at the state elections in 1928, 1930, 1932 and 1934.

In 1936, he left the Socialist Party and joined the Social Democratic Federation. He was later involved with the American Labor Party and the Liberal Party of New York.

He died at Beth David Hospital on December 6, 1944. He was Jewish.

== Sources ==
- NAME KARLIN FOR CONGRESS in NYT on August 11, 1922
- Who's Who in New York City and State (Vol. 10; 1938; pg. 599)
- WILLIAM KARLIN, 62, A LABOR ATTORNEY; Former Assemblyman, Once a Socialist Leader, Dies; Won Secondary Picketing Right in NYT on December 7, 1944 (subscription required)
- MRS. WILLIAM KARLIN in NYT on September 15, 1972 (subscription required)

New York State Assembly
Preceded by Henry S. Schimmel	New York State Assembly; New York County, 4th District; 1918	Succeeded by Samuel Dickstein
