= Joseph A. Whitehorn =

American politician (1879–1926)

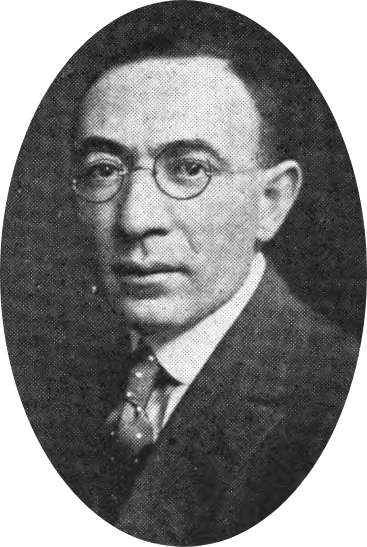
- Whitehorn c. 1918

Member of the New York State Assembly from the Kings district
- In office January 1, 1917 – December 31, 1918
- Preceded by: Isaac Mendelsohn
- Succeeded by: Joseph Lentol
- Constituency: 21st district (1917); 14th district (1918)

Personal details
- Born: April 7, 1879 Romania
- Died: January 23, 1926 (aged 46) New York City, U.S.
- Party: Socialist
- Education: New York University School of Law
- Occupation: Lawyer, politician

Joseph Aaron Whitehorn (April 7, 1879 – January 23, 1926) was a Romanian-American lawyer and politician from New York who served as a Socialist member of the New York State Assembly from 1918 to 1919.

== Life ==
Whitehorn was born in the Principality of Romania in 1879. After the death of his mother, when he was about ten years old he emigrated together with his three years older brother to the United States. They lived in New York City where Joseph became a paperboy, and some years later a clerk in a clothing factory. While working during the day, he attended the evening course at New York University School of Law, graduated in 1904, was admitted to the bar, and began the practice of law in Manhattan. The next year he moved to Brooklyn.

Whitehorn was a member of the Socialist Party of America. In November 1916, he was elected to the New York State Assembly (Kings Co., 21st D.), defeating the incumbent Democrat Isaac Mendelsohn. Whitehorn was a member of the 140th New York State Legislature in 1917. Mendelsohn contested Whitehorn's election, but the Assembly decided in favor of Whitehorn. In November 1917, after re-apportionment, he was re-elected to the Assembly in the 14th District of Kings County, and was a member of the 141st New York State Legislature in 1918. The Citizens Union called Whitehorn an "able and effective" legislator. In November 1918, he ran for Congress in the 3rd District, but was defeated by Republican John MacCrate who had also won the Democratic primary.

In November 1925, Whitehorn ran unsuccessfully for the New York Supreme Court (2nd D.), polling 17,568 votes.

Whitehorn died of a brain aneurysm on January 23, 1926. He was survived by his wife Sarah and three sons.

New York State Assembly
Preceded by Isaac Mendelsohn	New York State Assembly; Kings County, 21st District; 1917	Succeeded by Wilfred E. Youker
Preceded by John Peter LaFrenz	New York State Assembly; Kings County, 14th District; 1918	Succeeded by Joseph Lentol
