= The First Commandment (novel) =

2007 novel by Brad Thor

- Author: Brad Thor
- Cover artist: Larry Rostant
- Language: English
- Series: Scot Harvath
- Genre: Spy, Thriller novel
- Publisher: Atria Books
- Publication date: July 17, 2007
- Publication place: United States
- Media type: Print (Hardback & Paperback)
- Pages: 451 pp (First edition)
- ISBN: 978-1416543794
- Preceded by: Takedown
- Followed by: The Last Patriot

The First Commandment is a 2007 spy thriller novel written by Brad Thor. It was Thor's sixth book preceded by Takedown, and was followed by The Last Patriot. It features his fictional character Scot Harvath. It was first published by Atria Books in the United States in July 2007, in hardback and paperback.

== Plot ==
The five high-risk prisoners left the Guantanamo Bay detention camp. Among them was Philippe Roussard, a top sniper. The U.S. let them go in a secret deal, thinking they could track the men with a trace in their blood. The plan failed. The men swapped their blood on a plane and vanished. Roussard was free and wanted payback. This act, meant to keep kids safe, started a new wave of fear.

Six months later, Harvath's world broke when his girlfriend, Tracy, was shot outside his house. The hit came with a dark message: blood on his door, a shell casing, and a note promising blood for blood. Tracy fell into a sleep, and Harvath felt a drive to act. This was a planned hit by a pro with a grudge. The leaders told him to stay out of the case, but that only made him more set on finding the man who did it.

As Harvath stayed by Tracy's bed, his past and present met. He thought of his work and the bond he found with her. The hit on her was just the start. Soon, his mother was hurt in California and left blind, and other friends were struck in cruel ways. The path was clear: a foe was hunting everyone Harvath loved, using steps based on the Ten Plagues of Egypt.

President Rutledge stopped Harvath at every turn. He told him to stand down and let official teams work. The President would not share data, which looked wrong. Proof grew that the hits were tied to a secret deal. Harvath lost trust in the leaders. He was sure the President hid a key fact about the men who were let go.

Harvath refuses to stay on the sidelines. He turns to his own team, including Tim Finney and a group in Colorado. They found secrets and a man known as the Troll who sells data. Harvath learned that one of the freed prisoners was behind the hits. Because the leaders would not help, Harvath worked outside the law, making him a hunted man.

Harvath used the Troll's net to find the killer. The Troll helped Harvath see the path of the hits and the signs from the plagues. They found that the killer had help and a grudge linked to the work Harvath did in the past to stop terror groups.

The killer's hits followed the plagues, with each strike on those close to Harvath getting more cruel. From blood and bugs to sores and dark, the way he killed showed a pattern. The man was sending a message. He used those Harvath loved to show his own loss. The state could not act due to a secret deal, leaving Harvath alone to stop the next strike.

With no help from the leaders, Harvath started a hunt. He followed leads from Mexico to Brazil. He found the names of the other freed men, but the path always led back to Philippe Roussard. As Harvath got close, he saw that Roussard's grudge was deep, born from a past of terror linked to the secret work Harvath once did.

At the Sargasso site, Harvath and his team used data and black-market links to stay ahead of the killer and the law. They tracked cash and used the Troll's reach to find Roussard's plans. The team saw that the hits were part of a larger plan run by a man from Harvath's past.

The search showed that five men left the camp, not four. The fifth, Roussard, was the son of Adara Nidal and the grandson of Abu Nidal. Roussard's grudge was one he was born with; he wanted to avenge his mother's death, which happened during a job Harvath ran. The real mind behind the hits was Ari Schoen, who was Adara's lover and Roussard's grandfather, pulling the strings from the dark.

The truth behind the release came out: the President, under the threat of mass child murder, made a deal with terrorists to free the five men to save the lives of school kids. The deal came with a promise never to hunt the freed men, a promise that put lives at risk as Roussard's killing spree went on. Harvath's work threatened to break the weak peace, but he would not let guilt stop him.

Called a traitor, Harvath was hunted by a CIA team led by Rick Morrell, tasked with stopping him. As he stayed ahead of them, he raced to stop the last, most deadly strike. The state could not act because of its secret deal, leaving Harvath as the only line of defense. Roussard's last plan was found: a strike on a big wedding with the President and many of Harvath's friends. Using a fast boat with a big gun, Roussard wanted to turn the lake red with blood. Harvath, with help from old friends, stopped the strike in a high-speed boat chase.

Harvath rammed Roussard's boat to stop the massacre. The two men fought in the water, and Harvath killed Roussard. The hit was stopped, but lives were lost. Harvath was left to face his acts and the choices of the state. Harvath tracked the cash and the plan back to Ari Schoen. Schoen's path for revenge led him to use Roussard to target Harvath. In a meeting, Harvath refused to kill Schoen, leaving him to live with what he had done. The Troll ended it with a remote bomb.

The facts were clear: Schoen's want for revenge, the President's bad deal, and the choice to trade lives for the greater good. National safety showed the cost of the war. Each act of violence only made new foes. Harvath was cleared of treason but lost his place in the state. He cared for his hurt loved ones, including Tracy, who survived. He began to heal. The President wanted to make peace, but Harvath was changed, weighed down by the fact that this war is built on what one does.

== Reception ==
Kirkus Reviews called The First Commandment "Incessant action and artless narration for G. Gordon Liddy fans." while Publishers Weekly wrote "It's a long, violent, shoot-'em-up, blow-'em-up pulse-pounder that will leave Thor's fans cheering and begging for more." The South Utah Independent noted it "is eerily prescient of the Bowe Bergdahl prisoner exchange" and "All in all, it is an excellent mystery/thriller, and definitely worth your time."

== See also ==
- The Apostle (novel)
- The Last Patriot
- The Lions of Lucerne (novel)
