= First Commandment =

The First Commandment of the Ten Commandments may refer to:

- "I am the Lord thy God", under the Talmudic division of the third-century Jewish Talmud
- "Thou shalt have no other gods before me", under the Philonic division used by Hellenistic Jews and Protestants except Lutherans
- "Thou shalt not make unto thee any graven image", under the Augustinian division used by Roman Catholics and Lutherans

== Other uses ==
- The First Commandment (novel), a 2007 novel by Brad Thor
- "The First Commandment" (Stargate SG-1), a television episode
