= Jacob Panken =

American lawyer (1879–1968)

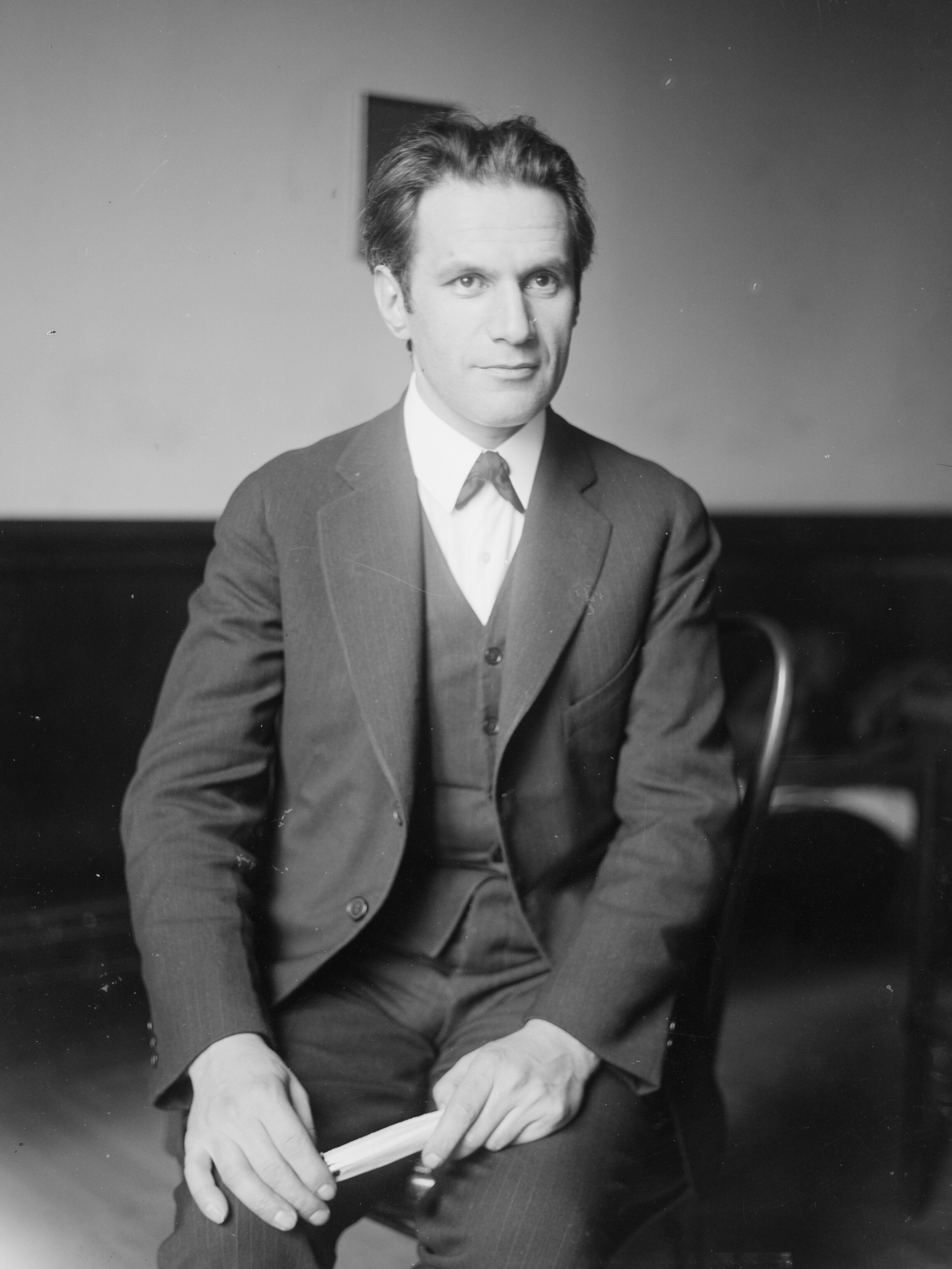
- Panken in 1920

Judge of the New York City Domestic Relations Court
- In office December 20, 1934 – January 3, 1955
- Appointed by: Fiorello La Guardia

Judge of the New York City Municipal Court, 2nd District
- In office January 3, 1918 – December 27, 1927
- Preceded by: Gustave Hartman
- Succeeded by: Abraham Harawitz

Personal details
- Born: January 13, 1879 Kiev, Kiev Governorate, Russian Empire
- Died: February 4, 1968 (aged 89) New York City, U.S.
- Party: Socialist (before 1936); Social Democratic (after 1936)
- Other political affiliations: American Labor Party (1939)
- Spouse: Rachel Pallay (m. 1910)
- Children: Hermione
- Education: New York University Law School
- Occupation: Labor leader, attorney, judge
- Known for: First Socialist judge in New York

Jacob Panken (January 13, 1879 – February 4, 1968) was a Ukrainian-born Jewish American socialist politician, best remembered for his tenure as a New York City municipal court judge and frequent candidacies for high elected office on the ticket of the Socialist Party of America.

== Early life ==
Jacob Panken was born January 13, 1879, in Kyiv, Ukraine, then part of the Russian Empire. He was the son of ethnic Jewish parents, Herman Panken and Feiga Berman Panken. His father was employed as a merchant. The family emigrated to the United States in 1890, arriving in New York City, where the family settled.

Panken went to work at age 12, working first making purses and pocketbooks. He later worked as a farmhand, a bookkeeper, and an accountant.

Panken married the former Rachel Pallay on February 20, 1910. His wife would eventually be a Socialist Party politician in her own right, running for the New York City Board of Aldermen in 1919 and for New York State Assembly in 1928 and 1934.

== Career ==
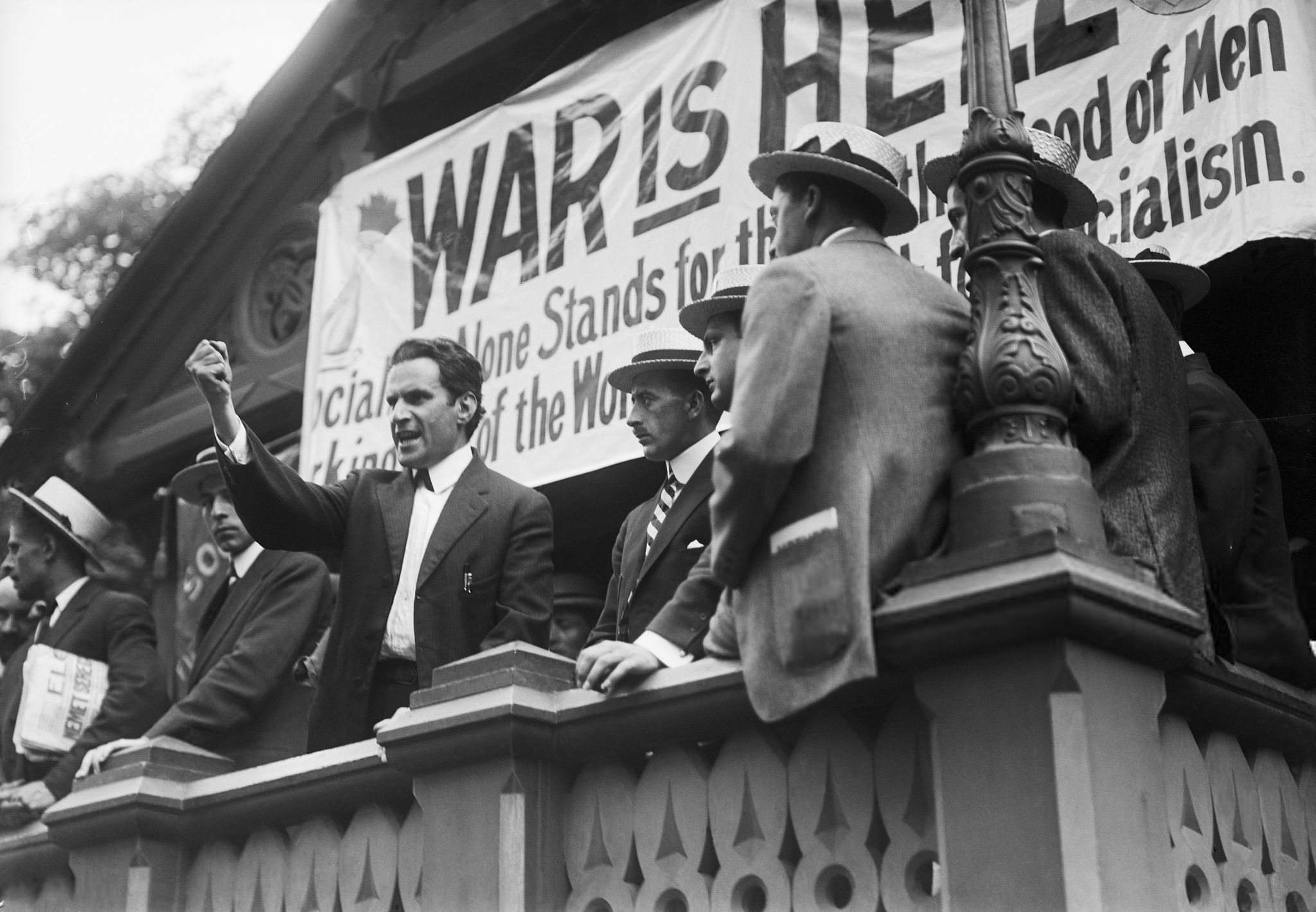
Panken speaks at an anti-war rally at Union Square in Manhattan c. 1918

In 1901 Panken left accountancy to go to work as an organizer for the International Ladies' Garment Workers' Union. Returning to the industry in which he first worked as a child, Panken was an organizer of the Purse and Bag Workers' Union in 1903. He graduated from New York University Law School in 1905 and became a practicing attorney in the city.

Panken attended the 1912 National Convention of the Socialist Party of America (SPA), to which he delivered the report of the "Jewish Socialist Agitation Bureau," forerunner of the Jewish Socialist Federation. An outspoken opponent of American entry into World War I, Panken was a member of the People's Council for Democracy and Peace in 1917.

Panken was a public advocate of civil rights for black Americans, sitting on the advisory board of an organization established in 1919 by Chandler Owen and A. Philip Randolph, the National Association for the Promotion of Labor Unionism Among Negroes, the motto of which was "black and white workers unite."

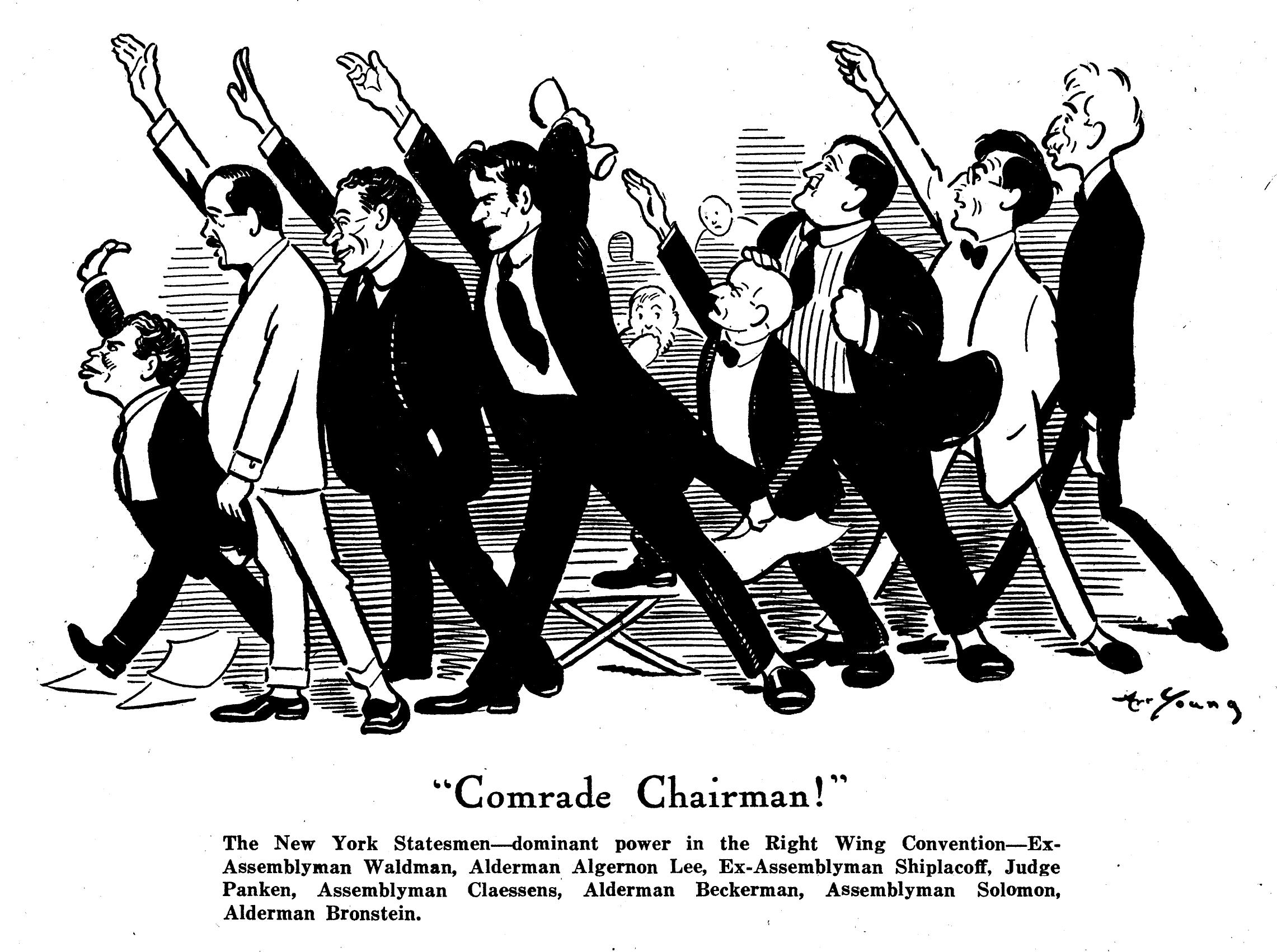
"Comrade Chairman!" Cartoon by Art Young depicting the New York Old Guard at the 1919 Emergency National Convention of the SPA. Left to right: Louis Waldman, Algernon Lee, Abraham Shiplacoff, Jacob Panken, August Claessens, Abraham Beckerman, Charles Solomon, and Alexander Braunstein.

Panken was a leading figure in the bitter 1919 Emergency National Convention of the SPA, chairing the all-important Credentials Committee which acted as a filter to insure the victory of the "Regular" faction headed by Executive Secretary Adolph Germer, New York state party leader Julius Gerber, and National Executive Committee member James Oneal. He was also a delegate to subsequent SPA conventions held in 1920, 1924, and 1932.

Panken was a frequent candidate for public office on the Socialist Party ticket. He first ran for New York State Senate in the 11th District in 1908. He ran for State Assembly from New York County's 8th District the following year. In 1910 he ran for Justice of the New York Supreme Court for the first time, later pursuing the office again in 1929 and 1931. He finally won election to a ten-year term as a municipal judge in New York in 1917, the first Socialist to be elected to New York City's Municipal Court.

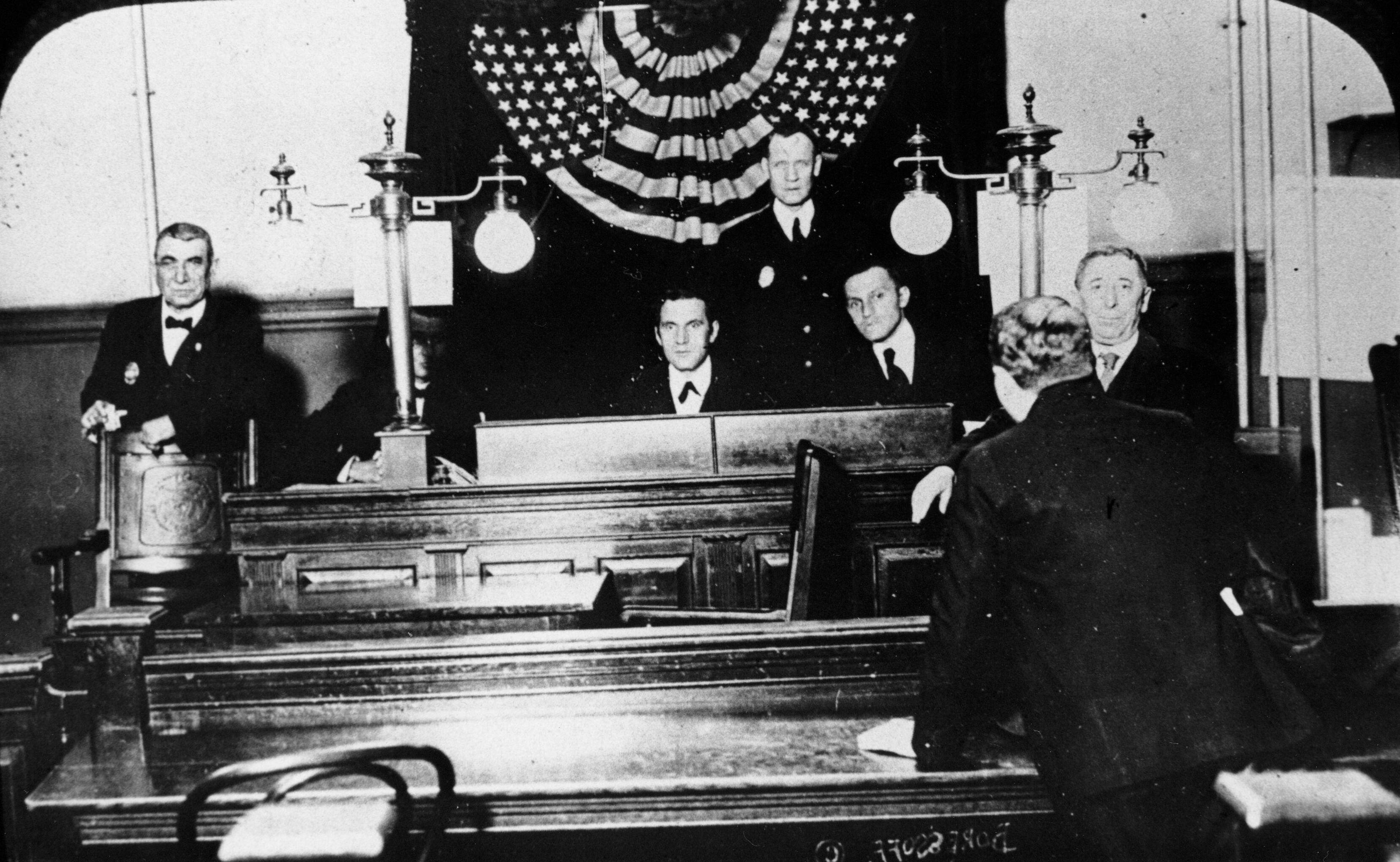
Panken on the bench c. 1918

During his time on the bench, Panken remained a candidate for high offices on behalf of the Socialist Party, pursuing a seat as U.S. Senator from New York in 1920 and running for Mayor of New York in 1921. Panken also ran for Congress in 1922 and for Governor of New York in 1926.

Panken's legal career was heavily influenced by two intellectual movements at the heart of his worldview: Yiddish socialism and legal realism. The former developed in the early 20th century, as Eastern European Jews integrated into American society by retaining Jewish cultural traditions but distancing themselves from religious practices. The Yiddish socialists were "hyper-political," advocating for economic equality, universalism, education, and feminism. Legal realists, meanwhile, believed that judicial interpretation could serve as a means of social reform, that the personal politics of a judge were inseparable from his verdicts, and that jurisprudence should follow social science instead of natural law.

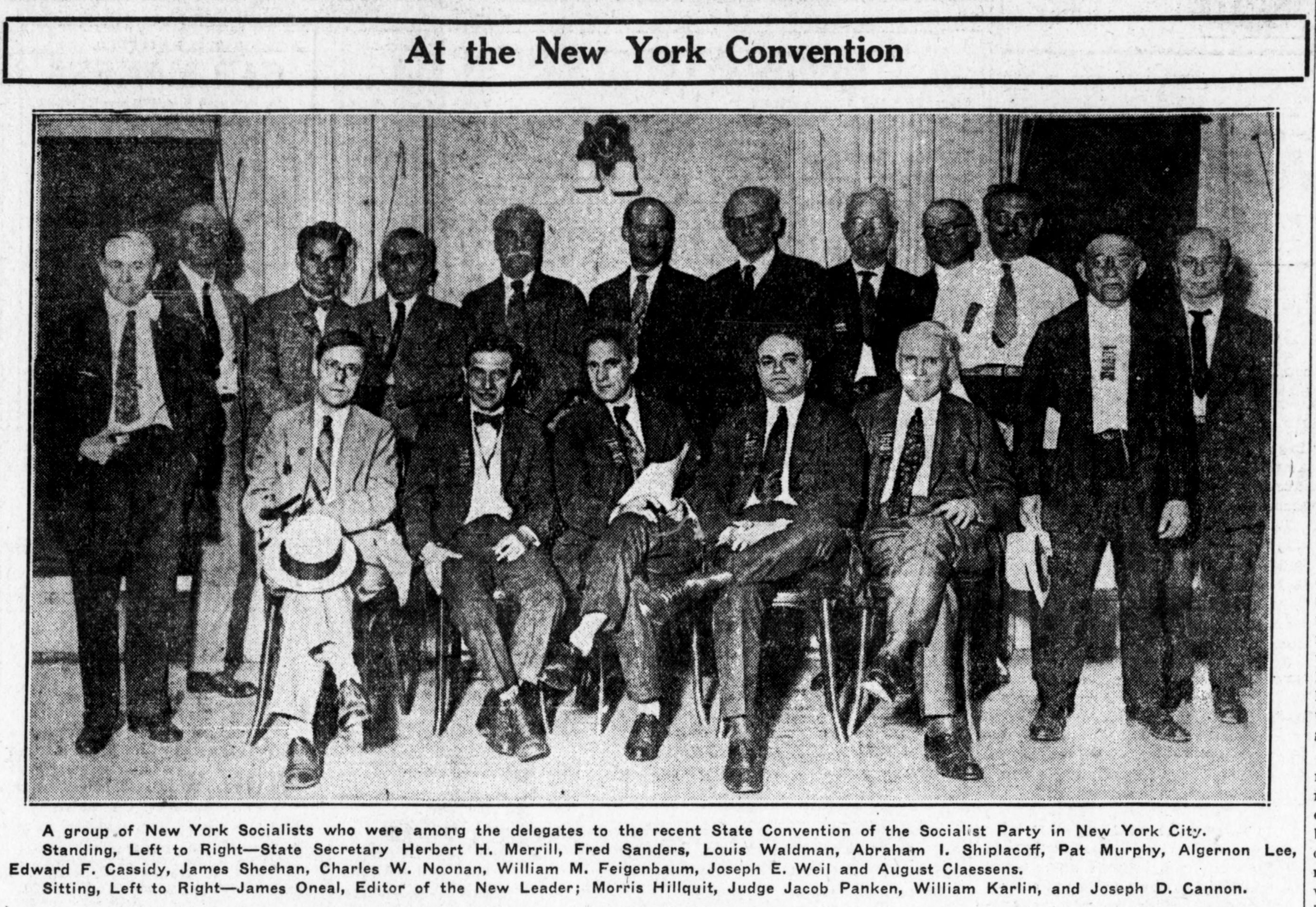
Panken (seated, center) in The New Leader, July 31, 1926

Running for re-election in 1927, Panken declined to accept endorsement from both the Republican and Communist parties and was defeated in his re-election bid. The 1927 election was the first in the New York City boroughs of Manhattan and Brooklyn to use voting machines in all districts. The result of the election was challenged, with allegations of vote rigging, including an allegation that the lever for Panken's name was rendered inoperable in one district.

The Socialist weekly The New Leader was livid, running a banner headline that "Tammany Thugs" had stolen the election for Democratic candidate Abraham Harawitz:

"The polling places of the 4th assembly district...were scenes of the most disgraceful election stealing.

"In all cases the Tammany election officials were flanked by a collection of gangsters who aided in the intimidation of voters who were being deprived of their votes. The Socialist [poll] watchers who made protests over the procedure were brutalized. The voters were threatened, brow-beaten, and flustered. Notorious gangsters, gunmen, and pimps were on hand in full force taking orders from the Tammany leaders....

"In one polling place a watcher had a gun poked into his ribs and a second later a thug struck him from behind, laying him out; in another polling place a gangster threw tear powder into the eyes of the two Socialist watchers just as the voting machine was being opened for recording of the votes; Socialist watchers were refused the right to note the results tabulated on the machines. Many were ejected and threatened."

Following his defeat, Panken ran again as a Socialist candidate for Congress in 1930 and for Chief Judge of the Court of Appeals in 1932.

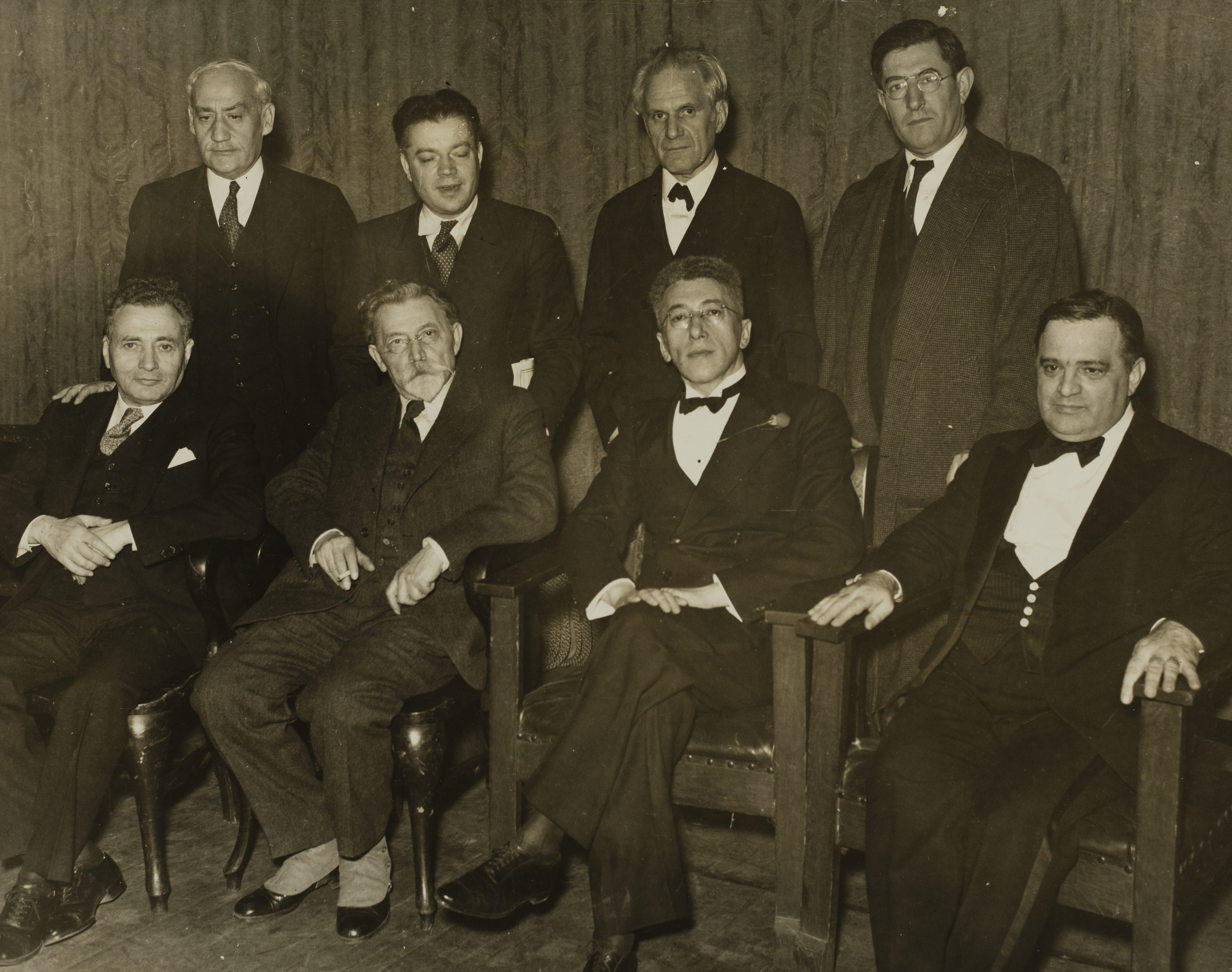
Panken and several other prominent New York politicos c. 1938. Seated (L-R): Joseph Weinberg, Dr. Chaim Zhitlowsky, Baruch Charney Vladeck, and Fiorello LaGuardia. Standing: Joseph Baskin, David Dubinsky, Judge Jacob Panken, and Judge Charles Solomon.

During the bitter internal party fight that swept the Socialist Party during the second half of the 1930s, Panken was a committed adherent of the so-called "Old Guard faction" headed by Louis Waldman and James Oneal. In 1936, he exited the SPA along with his co-thinkers to help found the Social Democratic Federation. He was also active in the American Labor Party, running once more for the Supreme Court as its candidate in 1939.

Panken was one of the most outspoken anti-Zionists on the Jewish left. As such, he was a key supporter of the Jewish Newsletter, published by William Zukerman, and also of the American Council for Judaism. When Harry Rogoff of The Jewish Daily Forward defended the Zionism of editor-in-chief Abraham Cahan, Panken responded as follows:

He forgets that most of Palestine belongs to the Arabs, and the number of the latter compared with the Jews is six to one . . . this movement gives precedence to the cause of 200,000 or even a million Jews over the kind of future in store for the 16 million Jews in the world. If there is a Jewish problem, it should be solved for the Jews all over the world, not only for the few who are already in Palestine or are going to be there.

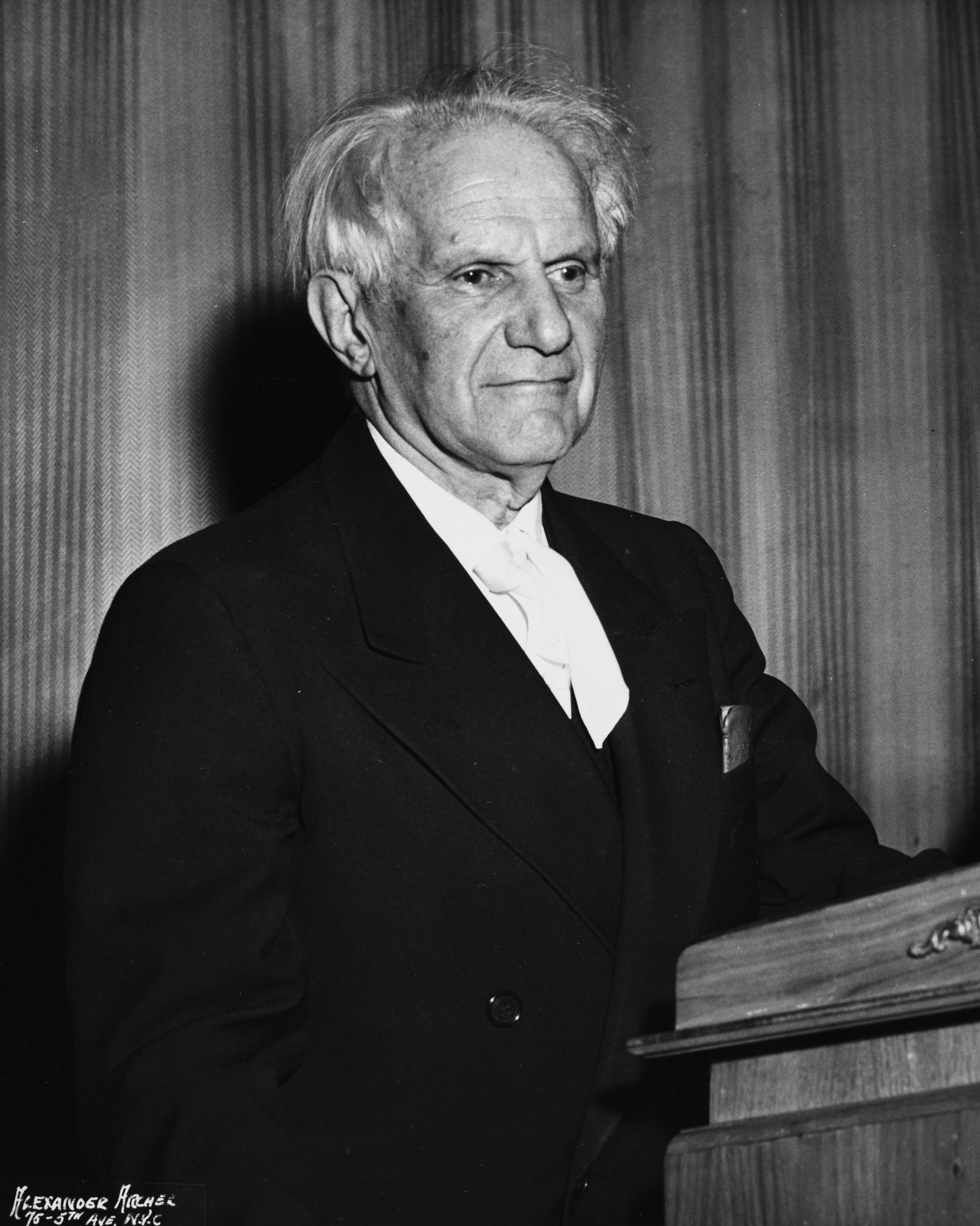
Panken at his 75th birthday celebration at the Commodore Hotel, February 13, 1954

In 1934, he was appointed to the Domestic Relations Court by Mayor Fiorello La Guardia and served until his retirement in 1955. During his tenure, he proposed five "commandments" for childcare:

1. Don't punish the child for wrong doings. Punishment has never cured anyone.

2. Give him the proper home atmosphere, by having pleasant relations between yourselves.

3. The mother should develop a better understanding of all matters regarding their children.

4. Fathers should refrain from beatings and unnecessary cursing in the presence of the child.

5. Give them a good book to read.

== Death and legacy ==
Panken died in the Bronx, New York on February 4, 1968, at the age of 89.

His papers are housed at the Wisconsin Historical Society on the campus of the University of Wisconsin–Madison, as well as at the Tamiment Library on the campus of New York University.

== Campaign materials gallery ==
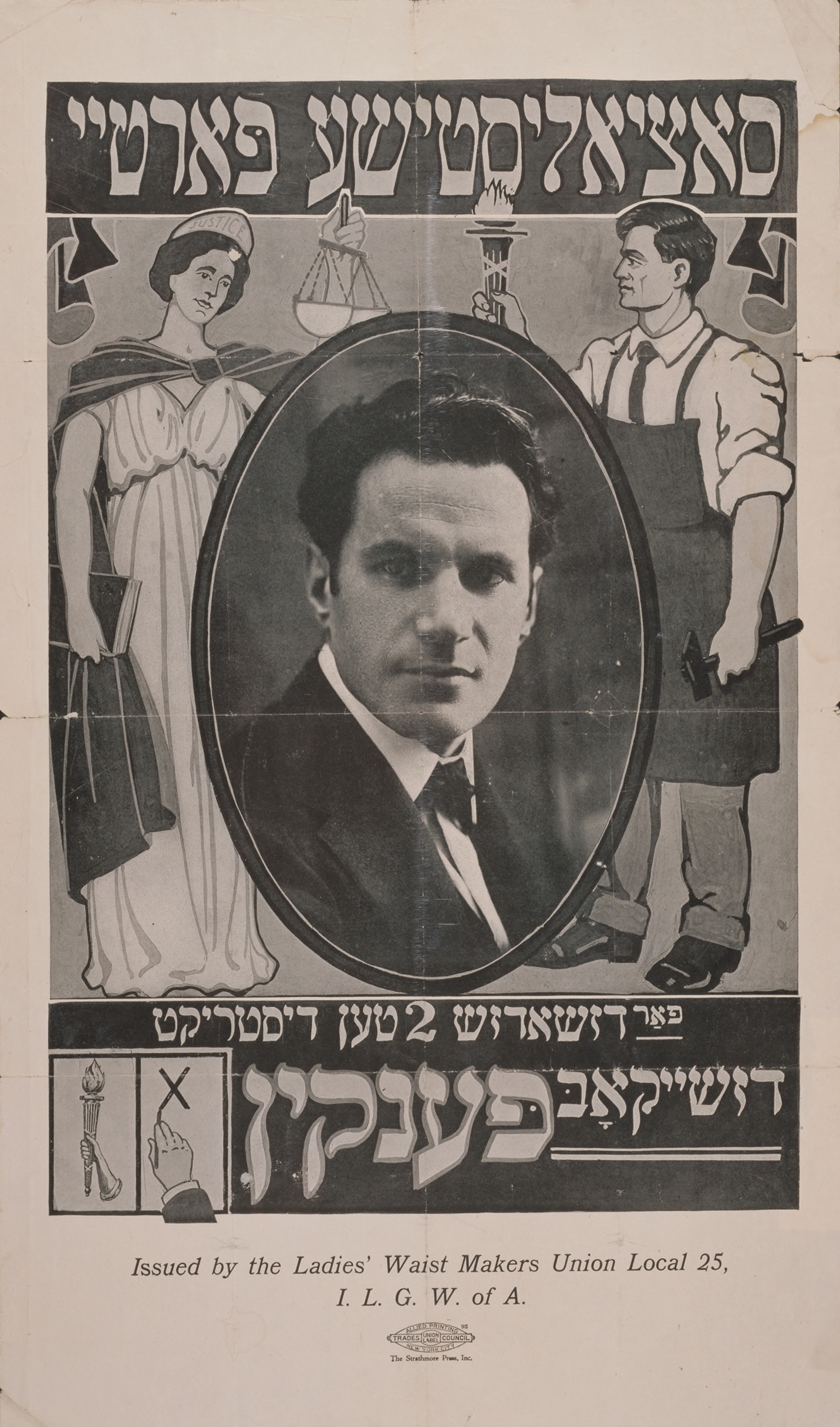
For Judge of the Municipal Court in the 2nd District, 1917

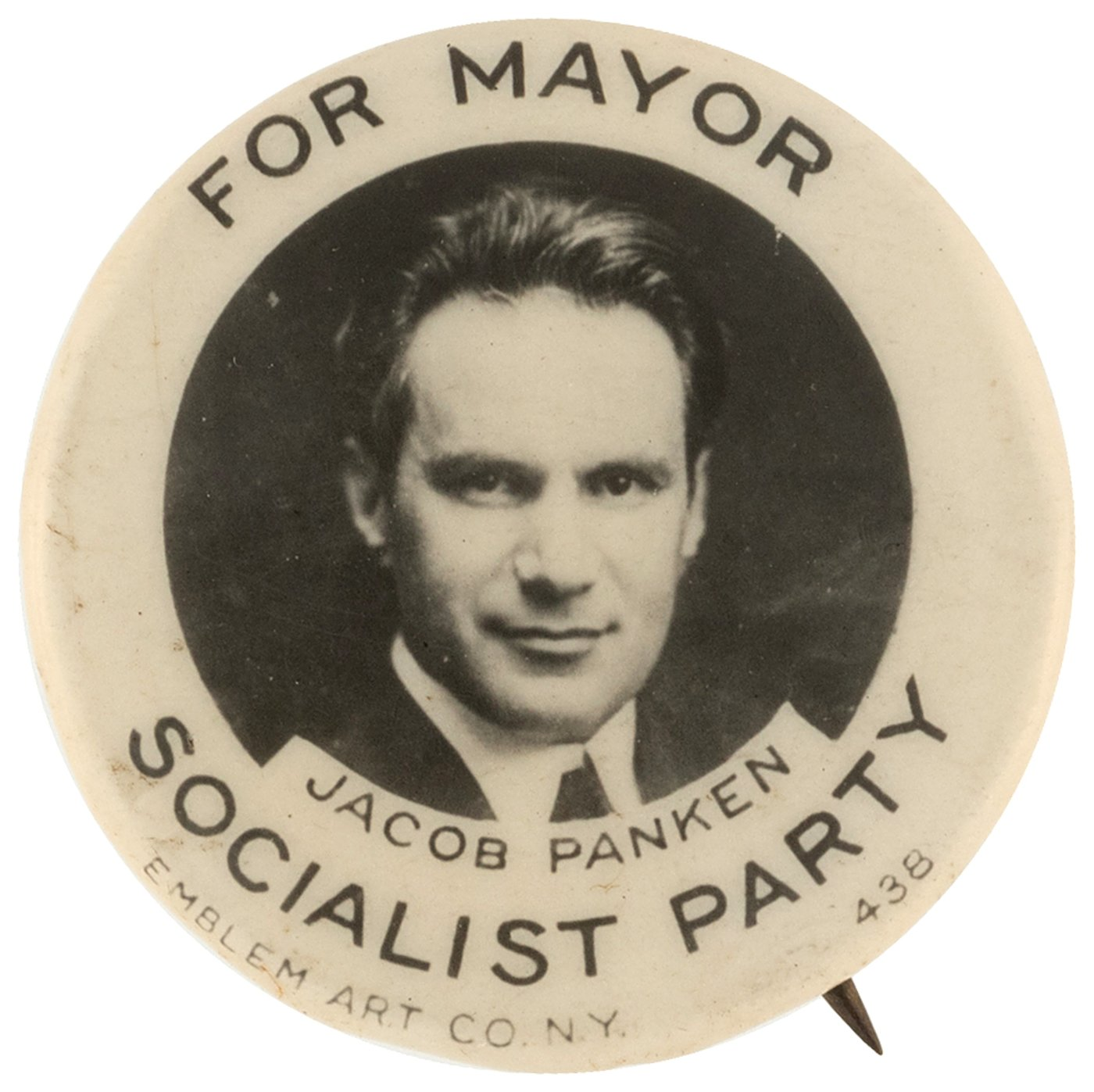
For Mayor of New York City, 1921

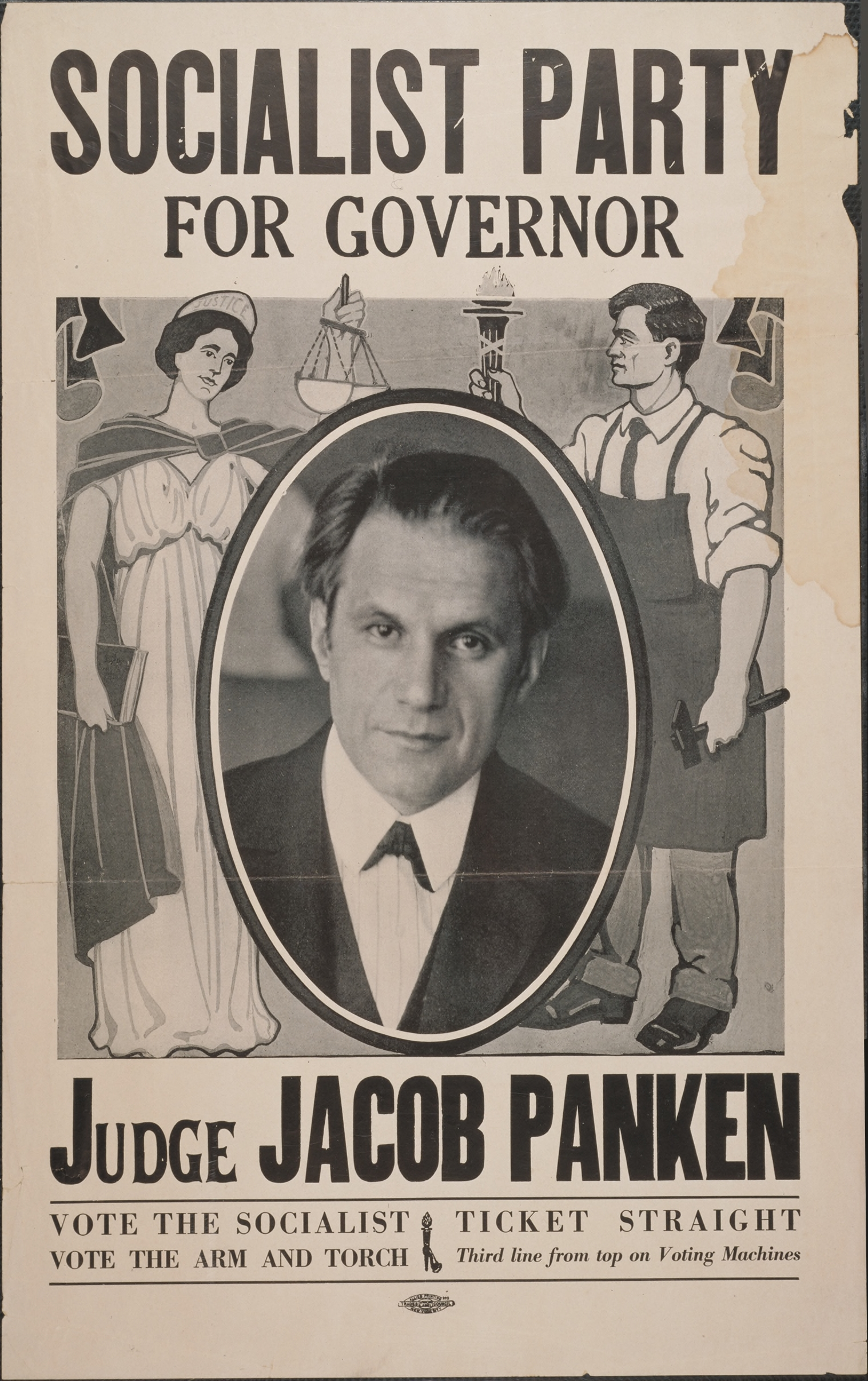
For Governor of New York, 1926

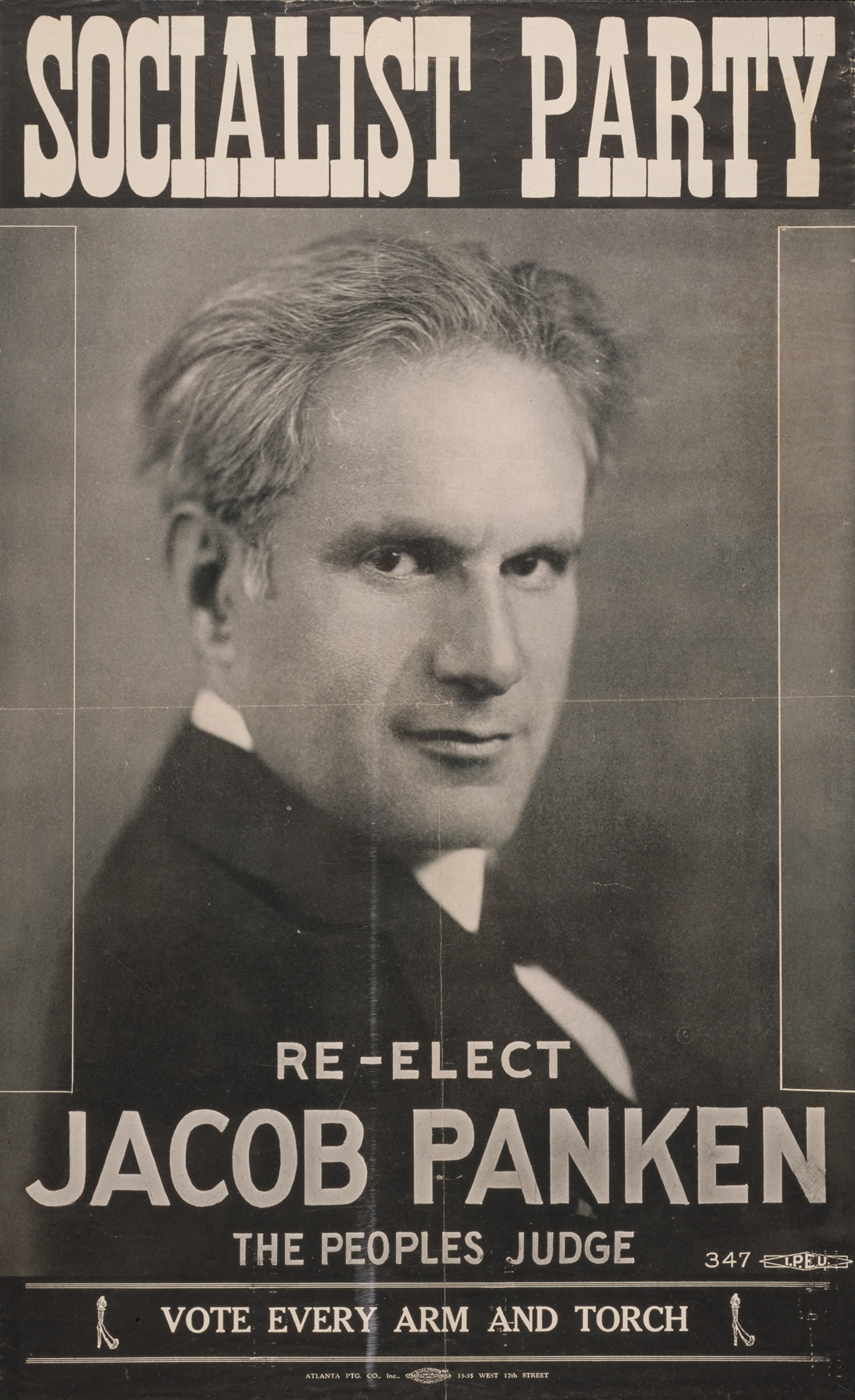
For re-election as Judge of the Municipal Court in the 2nd District, 1927

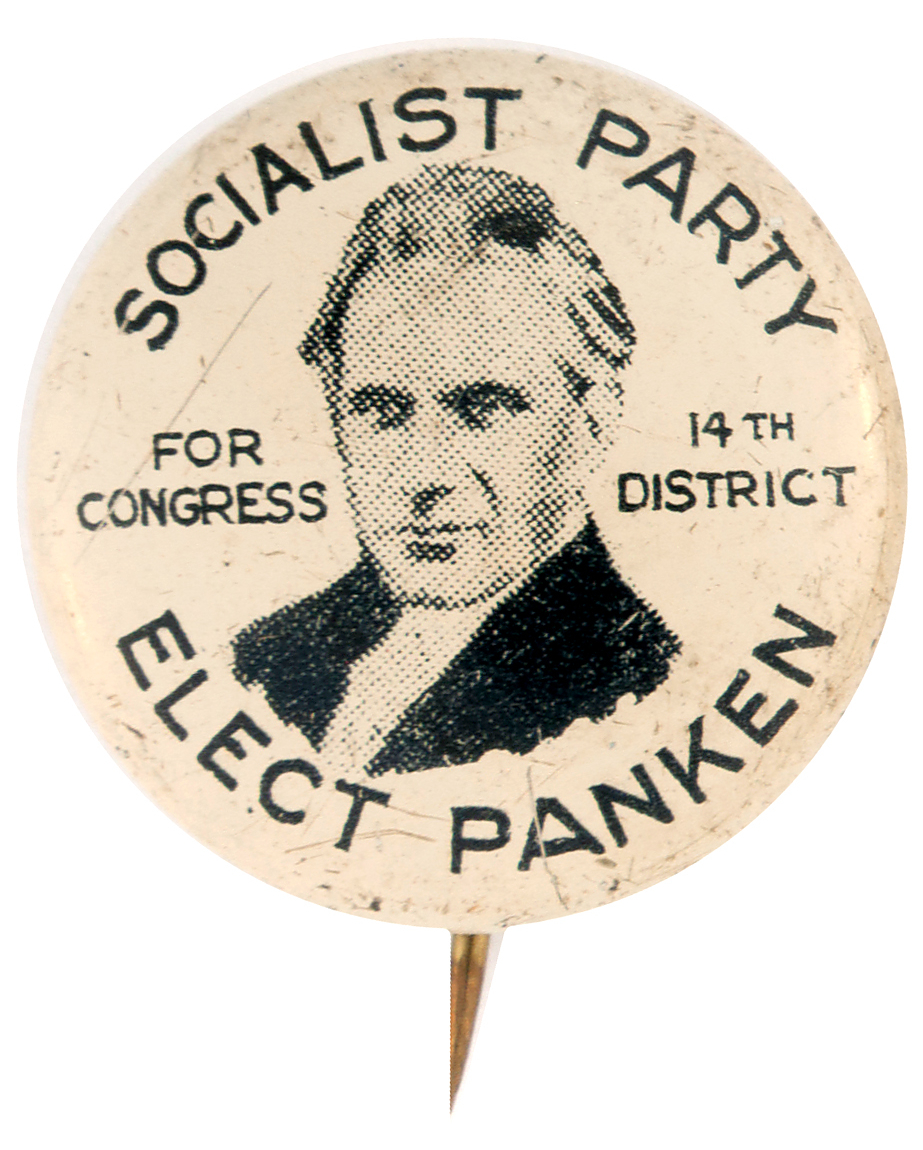
For Congress in the 14th district, 1930

== Works ==
- European Jewry in 1925. New York: American Ort, 1925.
- Socialism for America. New York: Rand School Press, n.d. [c. 1933].
- A Judge Sees Germany in Its Color. New York: Jewish Labor Committee, n.d. [early 1940s].
- The Child Speaks: The Prevention of Juvenile Delinquency. New York: Henry Holt, 1941.
- Delinquency and Guidance. New York: Child Care Publications, 1947.
- A Northern Judge Looks at the South. Baltimore: The Crisis, 1947.
