= Act of War (disambiguation) =

An Act of war or casus belli is an action by one country against another with an intention to provoke a war or an action that occurs during a declared war or armed conflict between military forces of any origin.

Act of war may also refer to:

- Act of War (novel), a 2014 novel by Brad Thor
- Act of War: Direct Action, a 2005 video game
- Act of War: High Treason, a 2006 video game
- Jedi Council: Acts of War, a 2001 comic book miniseries set in the Star Wars universe
- Act of War, a 2009 novel by Dale Brown
- "Act of War", a song on the 1985 Elton John album Ice on Fire
- Tom Clancy's Op-Center: Acts of War, a 1997 novel

== See also ==
- Casus belli (disambiguation)
