= Commandment =

Commandment may refer to:

- The Ten Commandments
- One of the 613 mitzvot of Judaism
- The Great Commandment
- The New Commandment
- Commandment (album), a 2007 album by Six Feet Under
- Commandments (film), a 1997 film starring Aidan Quinn

== Other ==
- Commandment (horse), an American thoroughbred race horse

== See also ==
- First Commandment (disambiguation)
- Second Commandment (disambiguation)
