= Casus belli (disambiguation) =

Casus belli is a Latin expression meaning "An act or event that provokes or is used to justify war".

Casus Belli may also refer to:

- Casus Belli (Jericho episode), an episode of the American television series Jericho
- Casus Belli (magazine), a French roleplaying magazine
- Casus Belli (Homeland), an episode of the American television series Homeland

== See also ==
- Acts of war (disambiguation)
