= Second Commandment =

The Second Commandment of the Ten Commandments may refer to:

- "Thou shalt have no other gods before me. Thou shalt not make unto thee any graven image" under the Talmudic division of the third-century Jewish Talmud
- "Thou shalt not make unto thee any graven image" under the Philonic division used by Hellenistic Jews, Greek Orthodox and Protestants except Lutherans
- "Thou shalt not take the name of the Lord thy God in vain" under the Augustinian division used by Roman Catholics and Lutherans

== Other uses ==
- The second greatest commandment is to "love thy neighbor as thyself."
