= Abraham Harawitz =

Jewish-American lawyer, politician, and judge

Abraham Harawitz (May 8, 1879 – May 24, 1935) was a Russian-born Jewish-American lawyer, politician, and judge from New York.

== Life ==
Harawitz was born on May 8, 1879, in Minsk, Russia, the son of Moses and Mollie Harawitz. He immigrated to America when he was seven and grew up on the Lower East Side in New York City.

After attending public school, Harawitz studied in the College of the City of New York from 1895 to 1898. He then went to the New York University School of Law, graduating from there with an LL.B. in 1900. After graduating, he worked as a lawyer in New York City, with an office in 7 Beekman Street.

Harawitz joined the Tammany Hall Club of the Eighth Assembly District immediately after he was admitted to the bar and became active in Tammany Hall. In 1905, he was elected to the New York State Assembly as a Democrat, representing the New York County 8th District. He was elected over Louis Freidel and Jacob Panken. He served in the Assembly in 1906 and 1907. In the latter year, he had been elected with support from the Independence League. He refused to serve a third term in the Assembly. He was a delegate to the 1915 New York State Constitutional Convention. By then, he had a law office on Broadway.

In 1927, Harawitz was elected Justice of the Municipal Court over Jacob Panken. He was still serving as Justice when he died. Upon his death, Mayor La Guardia appointed Louis J. Lefkowitz to replace him to the Municipal Court.

Harawitz was married to Nettie Zolty. Their children were Howard L. and Milton.

Harawitz died in his apartment in the Broadway Central Hotel from a two-week illness on May 24, 1935. He was buried in Mount Zion Cemetery.

New York State Assembly
Preceded by Louis Freidel	New York State Assembly; New York County, 8th District; 1906–1907	Succeeded by Moritz Graubard
