= 1921 New York City mayoral election =

- November 8, 1921
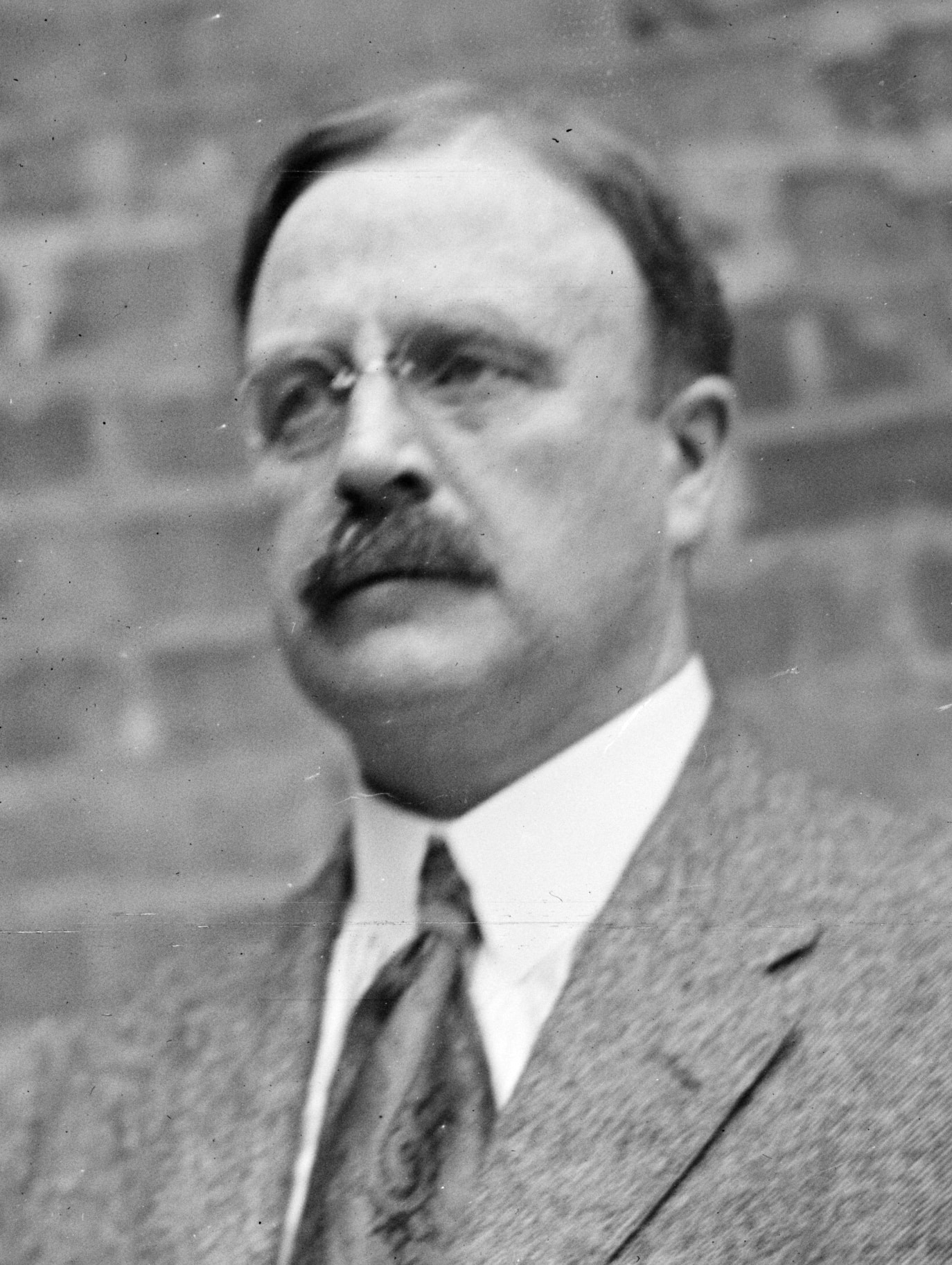

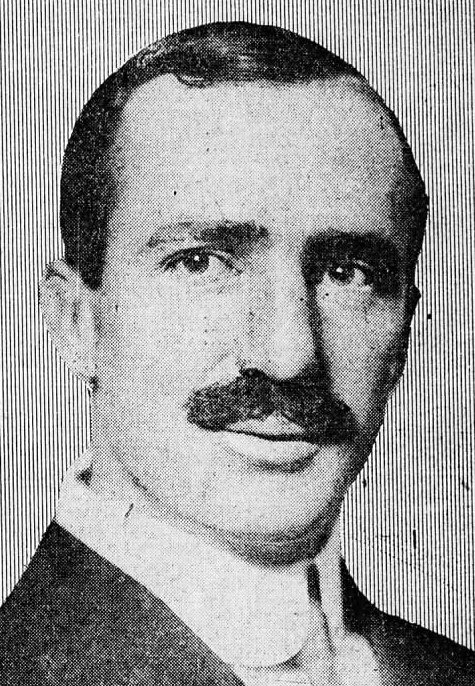

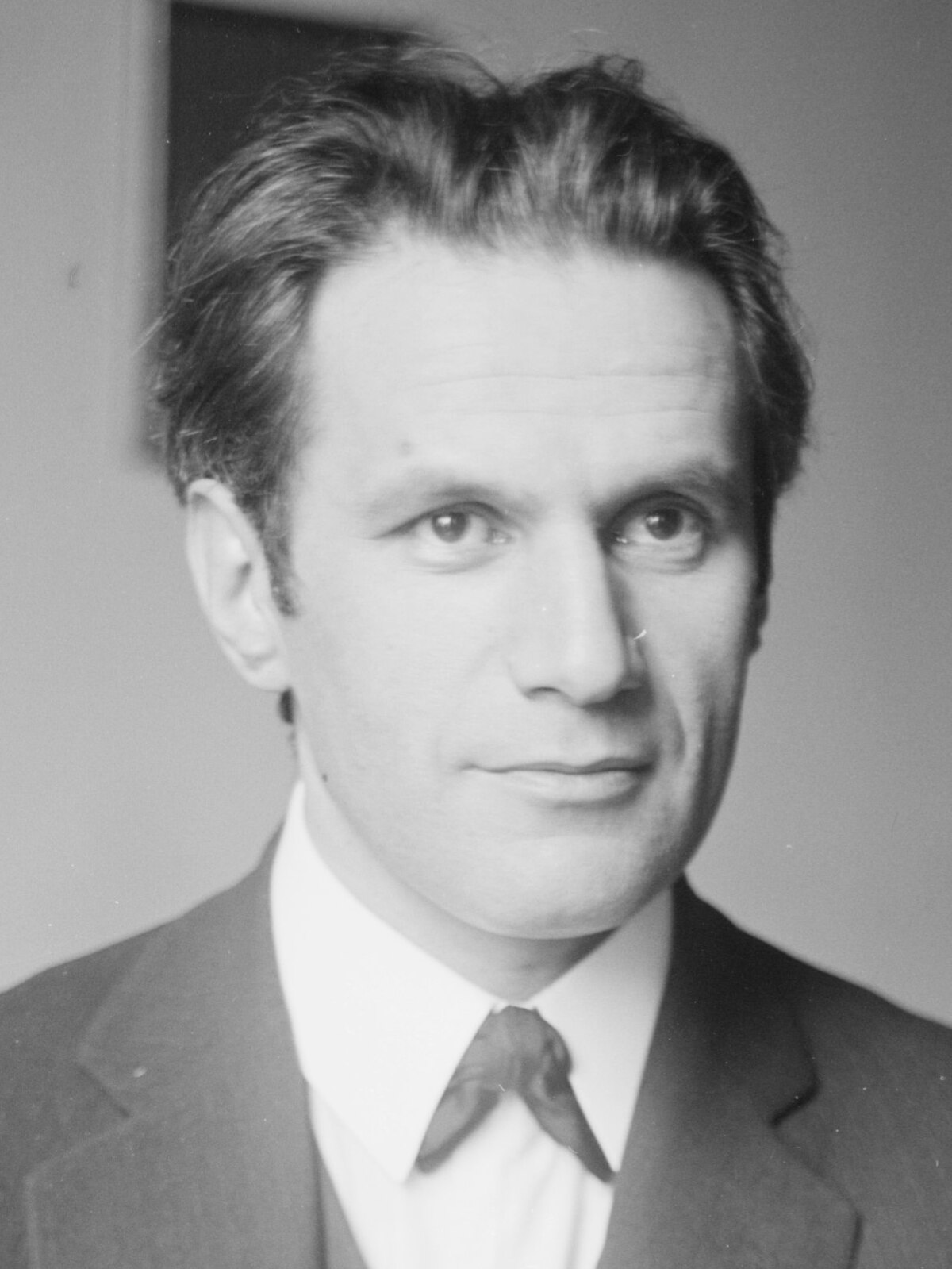
Nominee	John F. Hylan	Henry H. Curran	Jacob Panken
Party	Democratic	Republican	Socialist
Alliance		Coalition
Popular vote	750,247	332,846	82,607
Percentage	64.2%	28.5%	7.1%
- Results by Borough; Hylan: 60–70% 70–80%
Mayor before election
John F. Hylan
Democratic
Elected mayor
John F. Hylan
Democratic

The 1921 New York City mayoral election took place on November 8, 1921, resulting in a victory for Democratic Party candidate John Francis Hylan. Hylan faced Manhattan borough president and Republican Party candidate Henry Curran, and the Socialist Party candidate Jacob Panken. Hylan was the son of an Irish-Catholic immigrant and affiliated with Tammany Hall machine politics. Curran had run as a coalition candidate for the Republican factions. Panken had run a progressive campaign and gained support from Milwaukee mayor Daniel Hoan, but failed to generate the same level of support as the Socialist candidate from the prior election, Morris Hillquit.

In the primary election for mayor, Henry Curran heavily defeated Fiorello H. La Guardia, president of the board of aldermen.

== Republican primary ==
=== Candidates ===
- Henry H. Curran, Manhattan Borough President
- Fiorello La Guardia, president of the Board of Aldermen

== General election ==
=== Candidates ===
- Henry H. Curran, Manhattan Borough President (Republican-Coalition)
- Jerome T. de Hunt (Farmer-Labor)
- George K. Hinds (Prohibition)
- John F. Hylan, incumbent mayor since 1918 (Democratic)
- Jacob Panken, New York City Municipal Court judge (Socialist)
- John P. Quinn (Socialist Labor)

=== Results ===
1921 New York City mayoral election
Party	Candidate	Votes	%
Democratic	John F. Hylan (incumbent)	750,247	64.2%
Republican	Henry H. Curran	332,846	28.5%
Socialist	Jacob Panken	82,607	7.1%
Socialist Labor	John P. Quinn	1,049	0.1%
Prohibition	George K. Hinds	1,010	0.1%
Farmer–Labor	Jerome T. De Hunt	1,008	0.1%
Total votes		1,168,767	100.00%

==== Results by borough ====
1921	Party	Manhattan	The Bronx	Brooklyn	Queens	Richmond [Staten Is.]	Total	%
John Francis Hylan	Democratic	261,452	118,235	260,143	87,676	22,741	750,247	64.2%
John Francis Hylan	Democratic	62.9%	67.6%	62.1%	69.0%	70.8%	750,247	64.2%
Henry H. Curran	Republican - Coalition	124,253	34,919	128,259	36,415	9,000	332,846	28.5%
Henry H. Curran	Republican - Coalition	29.9%	20.0%	30.6%	28.6%	28.0%	332,846	28.5%
Jacob Panken	Socialist	28,756	21,255	29,580	2,741	275	82,607	7.1%
Jacob Panken	Socialist	6.9%	12.2%	7.1%	2.2%	0.9%	82,607	7.1%
Jerome T. De Hunt	Farmer Labor	321	133	395	88	71	1,008	0.1%
John P. Quinn	Socialist Labor	316	244	346	123	20	1,049	0.1%
George K. Hinds	Prohibition	375	120	390	111	14	1,010	0.1%
TOTAL		415,473	174,906	419,113	127,154	32,121	1,168,767	
