= Edna Luby =

American actress (1884–1928)

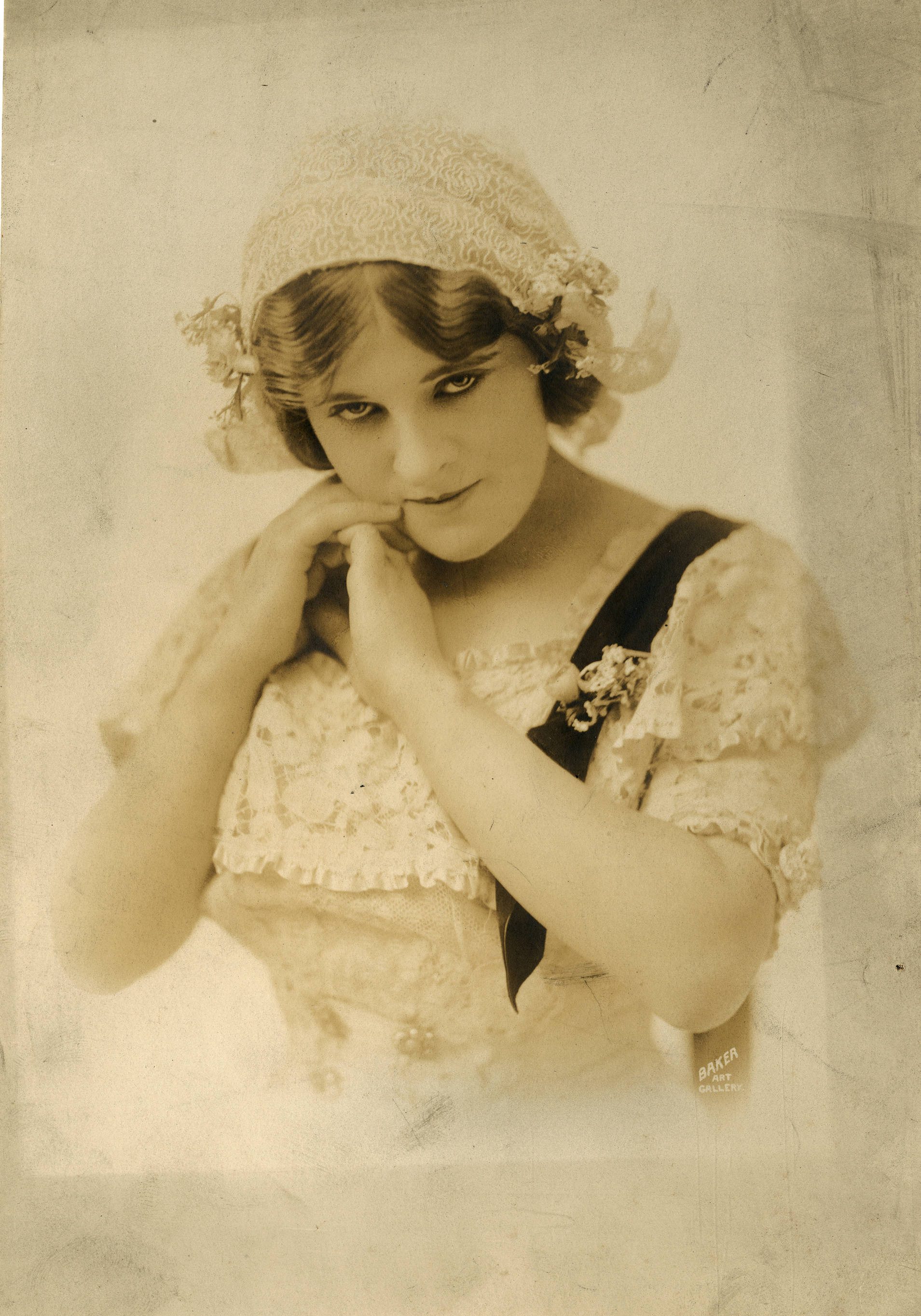
- Edna Luby in 1912
- Born: October 12, 1884; New York City, U.S.
- Died: October 1, 1928 (aged 43); Bronx, New York City, U.S.
- Occupations: Actress, comedian
- Years active: 1900–1928
- Spouse: Samuel Thor
- Relatives: Sigmund Lubin (uncle)

Edna Luby (October 12, 1884 – October 1, 1928) was an American actress and comedian. She acted on stage and in silent films and performed in vaudeville as a celebrity impersonator. Luby was the niece of Sigmund Lubin, a pioneer film producer.

== Early life ==
Edna Luby was born in New York City to Jewish parents Louis and Emma Luby. Her father was an optician. A short while later Luby and her family relocated to London, England, where as a young girl she attracted some attention by mimicking her classmates. She soon developed a keen interest in the theatre that was nourished by her mother when, at the age of ten, she began receiving elocution instructions from the American-born British actress, Geneviève Ward.

== Career ==
Luby was back in New York by 1900 where she made her professional stage debut at the Garden Theatre as a stand-in for actress May Buckley in Hearts Are Trumps that year during its February to May run. Hearts Are Trumps, a four-act melodrama, was written by Cecil Raleigh, produced by Charles Frohman and had also introduced to Broadway theatergoers a young Cecil B. De Mille. In late 1902 Luby was well received at the Madison Square Theatre, New York after she succeeded Jessie Busley in the rôle of Estelle in The Two Schools. In December 1903 Luby played Greta opposite Fritzi Scheff in Babette at the Broadway Theatre, and a subsequent road tour. In May 1907 she joined the cast of the Anna Held hit musical comedy A Parisian Model at the Broadway Theatre. and later that year she appeared in the original 1907 Ziegfeld Follies production, playing Miss Mimique and Miss Edna Might.

During this time Luby often appeared in vaudeville at venues operated by Tony Pastor, Keith and Proctor and Percy G. Williams, performing her imitations of popular celebrities. She played in at least four silent films between 1910 and 1916. The Immortal Flame, her last, was a five-reel melodrama written and produced by Ivan Abramson and starred Maude Fealy.

== Death and burial ==
Sometime after Luby married Samuel Thor, a pharmacist, she left the stage to reside in Great Neck, Long Island. She died after an extended illness at Montefiore Hospital, Bronx, New York, just 2 weeks shy of her 44th birthday. She is buried in Mount Zion Cemetery in New York City.
