= Brad Thor =

American thriller novelist

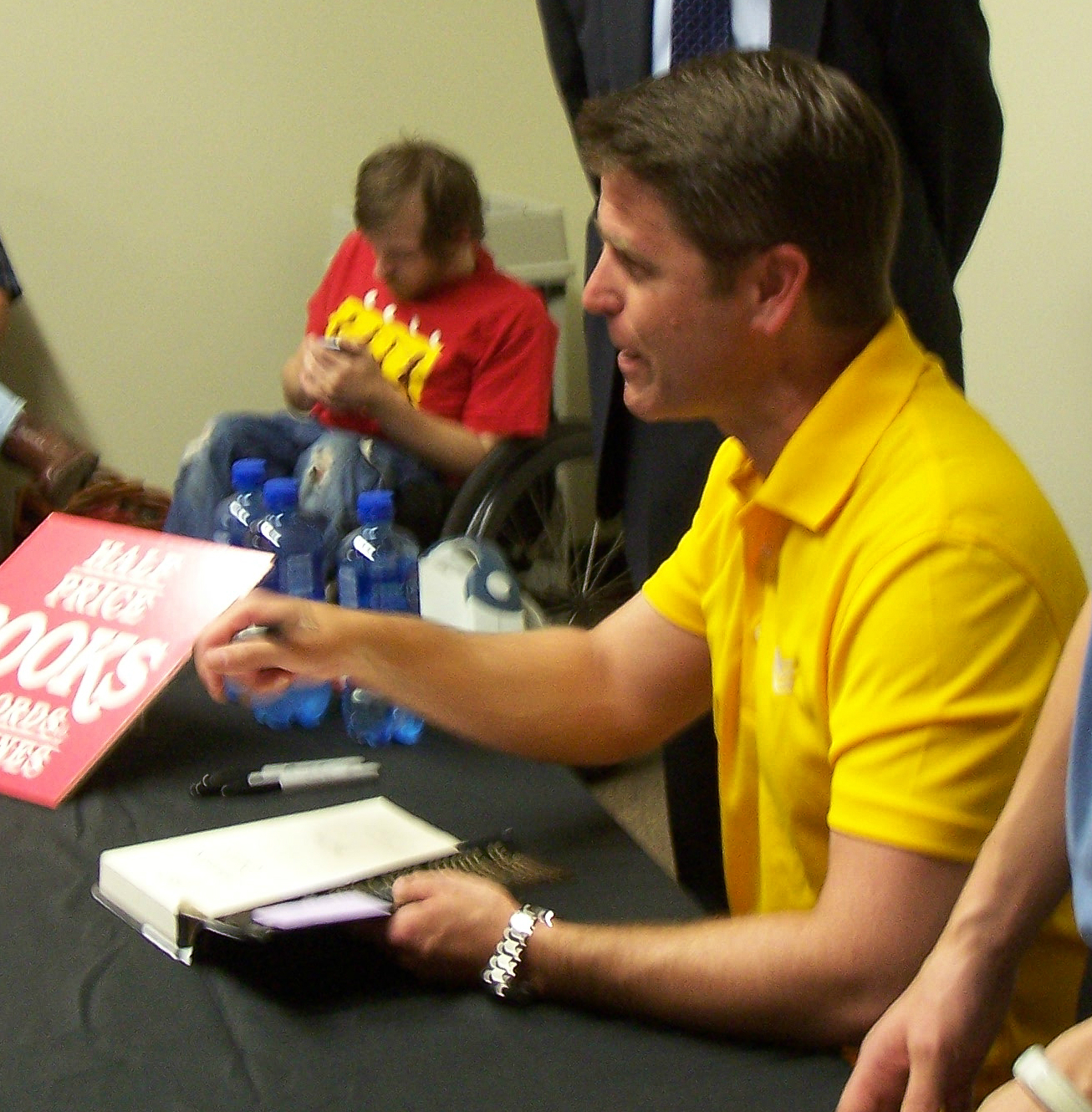
- Thor at a book signing in 2013
- Born: August 21, 1969 (age 57); Chicago, Illinois, U.S.
- Occupation: Novelist
- Writing career
- Period: Modern
- Genres: Spy novel, thriller, faction
- Notable work: Scot Harvath Series
- Website: bradthor.com

Bradley George Thor Jr. (born August 21, 1969) is an American thriller novelist. He is the author of The Lions of Lucerne, The First Commandment, The Last Patriot, and other novels. Thor's novels have been published in countries around the world. He also contributed a short story entitled "The Athens Solution" to the James Patterson-edited anthology, Thriller. Thor also makes frequent appearances on Fox News and The Blaze.

The Last Patriot was nominated for "Best Thriller of the Year" by the International Thriller Writers Association. His novel Blowback was voted by National Public Radio listeners as one of the "100 Best Ever" Killer Thrillers.

== Early life ==
Thor was born and raised in Chicago, and lived in Park City, Utah, for eight years.

Thor is a graduate of the Sacred Heart Schools, Francis W. Parker School, and the University of Southern California (cum laude), where he studied creative writing under author T.C. Boyle.

== Politics ==
=== Views ===
Thor is a member of The Heritage Foundation; he has spoken at their national headquarters on the need for robust missile defense.

=== Media ===
Thor is a regular contributor to the Glenn Beck television program and has appeared on other Fox News Channel shows, as well as on CNN, ABC, CBS, NBC, MSNBC, and PBS to discuss terrorism and parallels between his novels and real threats facing the world today.

In May 2016, he made speculative comments on the Glenn Beck radio show about Donald Trump that appeared to offer conditional support for violence against him if Trump were elected and did something that he felt endangered the country. Thor denied the comments were a call for assassination.

=== 2020 presidential campaign ===
Thor announced his candidacy for President of the United States in the 2020 election but on July 5, 2018, Thor decided against running and left the Republican Party, becoming an independent, citing frustration with the Republican-controlled Congress and President Donald Trump.

== Published works ==
=== Scot Harvath series ===
1. The Lions of Lucerne (2002, ISBN 0-7434-3673-3)
2. Path of the Assassin (2003, ISBN 0-7434-3675-X)
3. State of the Union (2004, ISBN 0-7434-3677-6)
4. Blowback (2005, ISBN 0-7432-7115-7)
5. Takedown (2006, ISBN 0-7432-7118-1)
6. The First Commandment (2007, ISBN 1-4165-4379-1)
7. The Last Patriot (2008, ISBN 1-4165-4383-X)
8. The Apostle (2009, ISBN 1-4165-4383-X)
9. Foreign Influence (2010, ISBN 1-4165-8659-8)
10. Full Black (2011, ISBN 1-4165-8661-X)
11. Black List (2012, ISBN 1-4391-9298-7)
12. Hidden Order (2013, ISBN 1-4767-1709-5)
13. Act of War (2014, ISBN 1-4767-1712-5)
14. Code of Conduct (2015, ISBN 9781476717159)
15. Foreign Agent (2016, ISBN 1-4767-8935-5)
16. Use of Force (2017, ISBN 9781476789385)
17. Spymaster (2018, ISBN 1-4767-8941-X)
18. Backlash (2019, ISBN 9781982104030)
19. Near Dark (2020, ISBN 9781982104061)
20. Black Ice (2021, ISBN 9781982104122)
21. Rising Tiger (2022, ISBN 9781982182168)
22. Dead Fall (2023, ISBN 9781982182199)
23. Shadow of Doubt (2024, ISBN 9781982182236)
24. Edge of Honor (2025, ISBN 9781982182274)
25. Choke Point (2026, ISBN 9781668065921)

=== The Athena Project series ===
- The Athena Project (2010, ISBN 1-4391-9295-2)

=== Standalone ===
- Cold Zero (with Ward Larsen) (2026, ISBN 9781668066379)
