= The Last Patriot =

- First edition cover
- Author: Brad Thor
- Language: English
- Series: Scot Harvath
- Publisher: Atria Books
- Publication date: July 1, 2008
- Publication place: United States
- Pages: 352 pp (hardcover)
- ISBN: 978-1-416-54383-1
- OCLC: 192048171
- Dewey Decimal: 813/.6 22
- LC Class: PS3620.H75 L37 2008
- Preceded by: The First Commandment
- Followed by: The Apostle

The Last Patriot is a thriller written by American novelist Brad Thor. It was Thor's seventh book preceded by The First Commandment, and was followed by The Apostle. It tells the story of counter-terrorism agent Scot Harvath's attempts to uncover a revelation that could damage the standing of Islamic extremism.

The novel was a number-one New York Times bestseller. The book was nominated for "Best Thriller of the Year 2008" by The International Thriller Writers Association.

== Plot ==
In the Islamic prophet Muhammed shares a final message with companions in the Uranah Valley, a final message was shared with followers before a leader's death. This truth was left out of the main books by those who feared its impact. Over hundreds of years, rumors spread. Its power to change law made it a threat to those in charge. The source sat where faith meets rule, putting world peace at risk.

Twelve centuries later, Thomas Jefferson found signs of this message while in U.S. Minister to France. His drive to learn led him to gather rare books. He hid his notes using a wheel tool. Jefferson thought the writing could stop the anger between East and West. He left hints in his things for a future find.

In Paris, Scot Harvath lived through a blast meant for a historian named Anthony Nichols. Harvath guarded Nichols, and a hunt began. Nichols, on a task for the President, almost had a rare book owned by Jefferson. With killers near, Harvath and Tracy fled. Harvath joined the fight to keep Tracy safe. He learned that Nichols was sent by the White House to find the lost message. The leaders wanted to end threats without a war. Harvath's skills and friends were needed as he dealt with double-crosses and secrets.

Matthew Dodd, once an agent, turned to the faith after a loss and now worked for those who wanted the message kept hidden. Led by radicals, Dodd acted as a hunter. He thought a strict faith could save a failing West. The hunt took the group from Paris to Rome and Washington. Every move was risky. Both sides wanted the truth for themselves. The message could remove the excuse for violence, making it a target. The race was for the soul of a creed and world safety.

With the book found, Nichols and Harvath had to solve Jefferson's puzzles using the wheel tool and signs in old buildings. Their search led to Jefferson's homes, where his work as a builder showed the way. The last piece was an old machine, hidden for years, that could show the message when started.

As the team neared the secret, they were sold out by people close to them. Radical teachers and dishonest leaders worked to keep the message buried. The killer Dodd began to remove both friends and foes. Whom to trust became unclear, and Harvath had to rely on a small circle to live.

Dodd, tired of the dishonesty on both sides, broke the old machine and the message. He removed his past masters, thinking no side should have the secret. The chance to change things from within was gone. The world went on with its fight. Harvath, having missed the message, had to face the limits of force.

Harvath tracked Dodd to the sea for a last fight. Dodd died in a standoff with a high leader. The events ended not with a message, but with death. The state hid what happened to avoid a scandal, and Harvath was left to fix his life.

Harvath met Tracy again, and they looked back on what was lost. The message was never made public, but it remained a hope for what comes next. The fight goes on, but the idea of a better time stays with those who look for it.
