= Mount Zion Cemetery (New York City) =

Jewish cemetery in Queens, New York

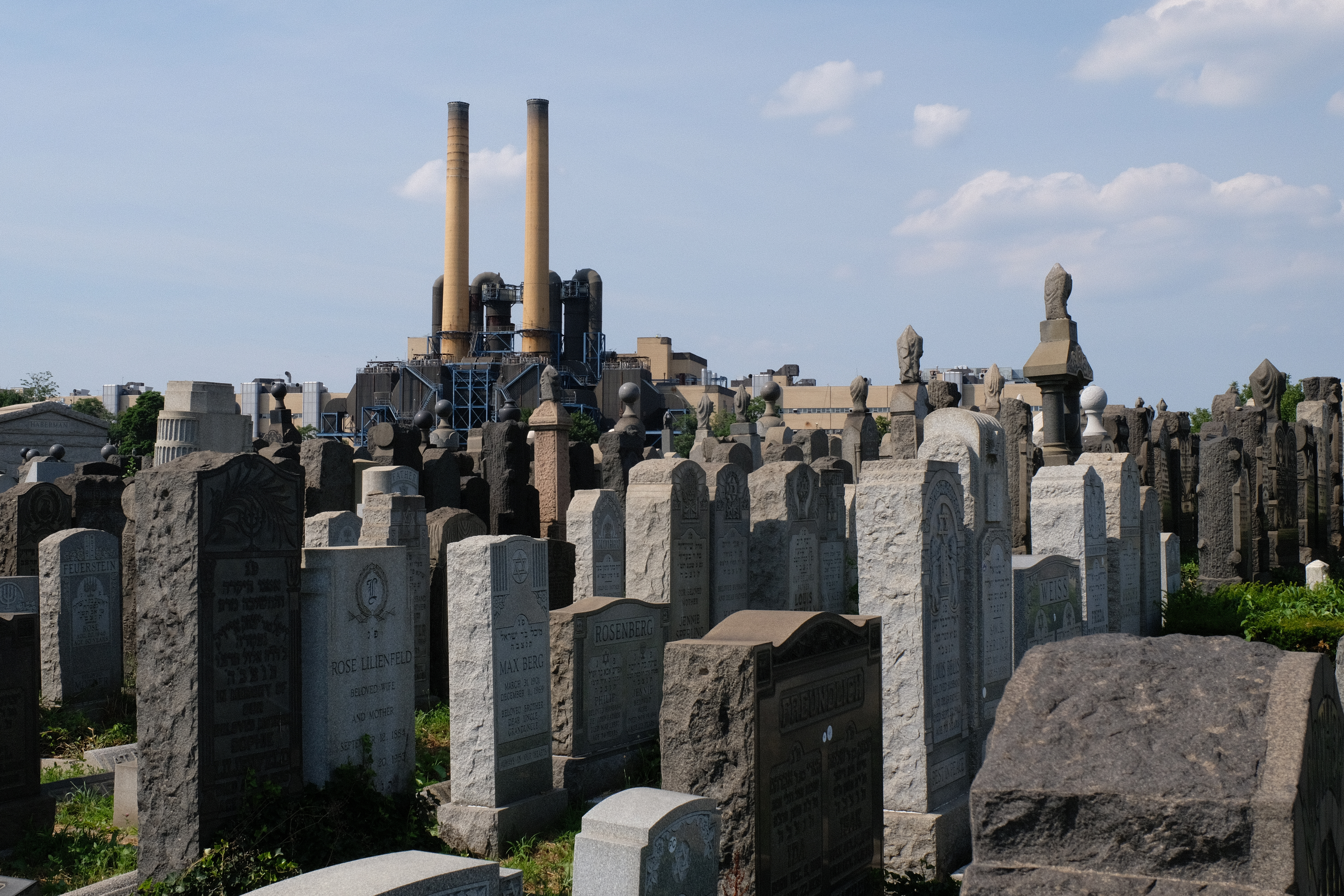
- Interactive map of Mount Zion Cemetery

Details
- Established: 1893
- Location: 59-63 54th Avenue, Maspeth, New York City
- Country: US
- Coordinates: 40°43′53″N 73°54′26″W
- Type: Jewish
- Size: 78 acres (320,000 m^{2})
- No. of graves: >210,000
- Website: Official website
- Find a Grave: Mount Zion Cemetery

Mount Zion Cemetery is a large Jewish cemetery located in Maspeth, Queens, New York City. The first burial was in 1893, and as of 2015, more than 210,000 individuals had been buried there. It is noted for its memorial to those who died in the Triangle Shirtwaist Factory fire.

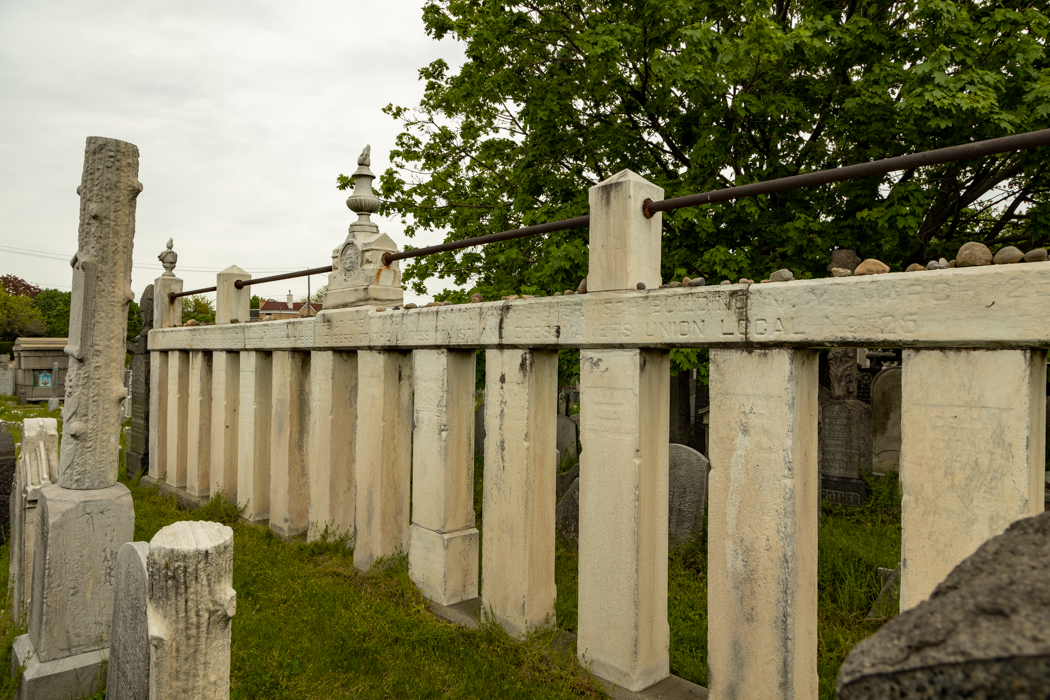
Triangle Shirtwaist Factory Memorial

The grounds are approximately 78 acres, and are divided into hundreds of plots, or gates, by landsmanshaften, synagogues, or families.

== Notable burials ==
- Herman M. Albert (1901–1947), lawyer, New York State Assemblyman
- Birdie Amsterdam (1901–1996), lawyer, judge, and New York State Supreme Court justice
- William Cohen (? –1916), U.S. Army sergeant killed by troops of Pancho Villa on U.S. soil in the Glenn Springs raid
- Bernard Drachman (1861–1945), rabbi
- Morris Michael Edelstein (1888–1941), US Congressman
- Isidore Einstein (1880–1938), federal agent in the Bureau of Prohibition
- Berta Gersten (1894–1972), actress
- Marvin Hamlisch (1944–2012), composer and conductor
- Abraham Harawitz (1879–1935), lawyer, New York State Assemblyman, Municipal Court Justice
- Lorenz Hart (1895–1943), lyricist
- Naftali Herz Imber (1856–1909), poet, lyricist, and composer of Hatikva, the Israeli national anthem. Disinterred and reburied in Israel in 1953.
- Mathilde Krim (1926–2018), medical researcher
- Irving L. Levey (1898–1970), New York State Supreme Court justice
- Edna Luby (1884–1928), actress and comedian
- Theresa Moers (1893–1924), killed by the boxer Kid McCoy
- Herman Weiss (about 1869–1934), New York assemblyman
- Nathanael West (1903–1940), author and screenwriter
- Eva Zeisel (1906–2011), industrial designer
