= The Lions of Lucerne =

2002 thriller novel by Brad Thor

- Author: Brad Thor
- Language: English
- Series: Scot Harvath
- Release number: 1
- Genre: Spy novel
- Publisher: Atria Books
- Publication date: January 15, 2002
- Media type: Hardcover, Paperback
- Pages: 432 (Hardcover), 544 (Paperback)
- ISBN: 0-7434-3674-1
- OCLC: 50550991
- Followed by: Path of the Assassin

The Lions of Lucerne is a 2002 spy novel by Brad Thor.

Thor's first novel with the character of Scot Harvath, an ex-Navy SEAL and current U.S. Secret Service agent, The Lions of Lucerne relates how Harvath survives an attack which leaves 30 of his fellow agents dead and the president of the United States kidnapped. Harvath then begins a search for those responsible and attempts to rescue the president.

== Plot ==
On the snowy slopes of Utah, a blast of white powder hits the cars, stopping the President. Every guard is dead except for Scot Harvath, a man who used to be a Navy SEAL. Harvath does not believe the claim that desert gunmen did this. He begins a lone search for the truth. Crossing frozen hills and thick snow, he is moved by duty and a need to get back at those who hurt his team. He fights to find the leader and catch the men who started the attack.

Harvath rejects the report and starts his own search. He believes the snow slide was a trap, not an act of nature. Even after he is blamed for a killing and chased by the law, he does not stop. He tracks every hint through the cold to find where the President was taken. As he looks, Harvath finds a plan that goes well past the Utah hills. A hidden group across the world stole the President to grab control and cash. Harvath sees he is fighting a trained, deadly team. There is little time left, and he must move now to stop a total ruin.

Harvath's search brings him to a lonely house in Midway. Inside, he finds an old man and woman killed. The sight shows just how mean his enemies are. As he looks around, he sees that the killers used this house to get away. Finding them like this only makes him want to catch the killers and free the President even more. Harvath's hunt is full of lies. He hits many walls, such as a tool used to stop radio signals during the snow slide. As he looks closer, he sees the lies are piled high to keep the truth hidden. Harvath trusts his own mind to get through the traps and stay ahead of the killers.

Harvath does not back down. He feels the loss of the men who died and the risk to the President. As he tracks each sign, he stays firm. He knows he has to move fast. Every tick of the clock brings him closer to the end, and he must find the truth to save the man he serves. The plan falls apart as the pressure grows. Harvath races to stop a ruin. Many lives depend on him. He uses what he learned to outsmart his enemies and bring the President back. The last fight is near, and he is ready to lose everything to finish the job.

Blamed for killing and the theft of the President, Harvath escapes to Switzerland. He follows a path from André Martin's files. Hiding in plain sight, he moves through the Swiss Alps to find the truth. He knows the answers are in the middle of the country, where he thinks the kidnappers are tucked away. Once in Interlaken, he gets ready for a deadly hunt, set on clearing his name and finding the President.

Harvath sends a coded note to a woman called "Aunt Jane," hoping to draw the men out. He plans a meeting at the Jungfraujoch, a high spot for travelers, to face whoever shows up. As he waits, he thinks back to the signs that brought him here: a Swiss candy paper and a mail box. Harvath knows this talk is his one shot to break the group and save the President. Vice President Marshfield is stuck in lies. Senators Snyder and Rolander pull his strings, promising him full control if he follows them. Marshfield shakes after he gets a cut finger in the mail as a threat. The Senators tell him all is well, but his fear grows as the plan spins away.

At the top, the meeting turns to blood. A woman pulls a gun on Harvath. Before either can move, a shooter fires on them. Harvath barely gets away, seeing just how bad the crime is. This fight proves that strong men are behind the act. The kidnappers, a team called the Lions, tell Marshfield to pay up or the President dies. Marshfield hits his breaking point. The Senators are ready to let the President die to get what they want. Their greed creates a spark that could blow up the world.

Harvath finds a way to flee and find more proof. He acts fast to stay ahead of the men chasing him. Moving through the cold Swiss hills, he stays firm. He uses what he learned to outsmart his enemies and show the world the truth. On the cold slopes of the Jungfraujoch, Harvath barely escapes a trap. He uses his wits to slip away, hiding among travelers to get clear. Even with men on his heels, he is set on finding the President. The path is full of risk, but he does not slow down.

Harvath finds a hidden fort where the President is kept. He faces the man in charge, Gerhard Miner. The fight is hard; Harvath uses all his strength to win. He is set on bringing Miner to his end.

== Characters ==
- Scot Harvath: The main protagonist, a former Navy SEAL and Secret Service agent who is the protagonist of the story.
- Donald Fawcett: A high-ranking government official who is involved in a conspiracy.
- Russell Rolander: A wealthy businessman who is part of a shadowy coalition.
- David Snyder: A Secret Service agent who is killed in the attack on the President.
- Mitchell Conti: A Secret Service agent who is killed in the attack on the President.
- Gerhard Miner, also known as Henk Van DenHuevel: A member of the Lions, a group of professional killers.
- Claudia Mueller: A Swiss Federal Attorney who assists Scot Harvath in his investigation.
- Arianne Kuess: Claudia's boss at the Federal Attorney's Office.
- Urs Schnell: Deputy Federal Attorney at the Federal Attorney's Office.
- Wilhelm Schroeppel: Gerhard Miner's cousin.
- Jack Rutledge: President of the United States.
- Amanda Rutledge: First Daughter of the United States.
- Sam Harper, also known as Sound: The head of president's protective detail.
- William Shaw, also known as Fury: Director of Secret Service Operations for the White House.
- Agent Maxwell: A Secret Service agent on First Daughter's protective detail.
- Agent Ahern: A Secret Service agent on President's protective detail.
- Agent Houchins: A Secret Service agent on President's protective detail.
- Hassan Useff: A member of the Lions.
- Klaus Dryer: A member of the Lions.
- Tom Hollenbeck: A Secret Service agent on protective detail.
- Chris Longo: A Secret Service agent on protective detail, Tom Hollenbeck's assistant.
- Agent Palmer: A Secret Service agent on protective detail, attractive, young female agent.
- Anton Schebel: A member of the Lions.
- Joe Maddux: Harvath's eldest son.
- Mary Maddux: Harvath's lawyer.
- Dr. Skip Trawick: Harvath's brother.
- Dr. John Paulos: Harvath's cousin.
- Gary Lawlor: Deputy Director of FBI.
- Agent Zuschnitt: FBI Agent.
- André Martin: A friend of Scot Harvath.
- Vance Boyson: A friend of Scot Harvath.
- Nick Slattery: A friend of Scot Harvath.
- Deputy MacIntyre: A deputy of Wasatch County Sheriff's Department, member of Church of Latter Day Saints.
- Jody Burnis: A CNN reporter.
- Agent Patrasso: An FBI Agent.
- Agent Sprecher: An FBI Agent.
- Dr. Sarah Helsabeck: Claudia Mueller's sister.
- Stan Jameson: Director of Secret Service.
- General Paul Venrick: Commander of Joint Special Operations Command.
- Adam Marshfield, also known as Star Gazer: Vice-President of the United States.
- Edward DeFina: Vice-President Marshfield's chief of staff.
- Director Vaile: Director of CIA.
- Director Sorce: Director of FBI.
- Nataile Sperando: Assistant to the Social Secretary of the White House, friend of Scot Harvath and André Martin.
- Herman Toffle, also known as Herman the German: A friend of Scot Harvath, wife is Diana.
- Diana Toffle: Herman Toffle's wife.
- Jackie Kreppler: A friend of Scot Harvath and Claudia Mueller.
- Rolf Kreppler: A husband of Jackie Kreppler, jealous of Scot Harvath.
- Johanus Schepp: Food and Beverage manager of Hotel des Balances'.

== Reception ==
Publishers Weekly wrote "it's hard to get past the novel's many graceless shortcomings, clichéd language [...], cartoonish scenes and a protagonist whose superhero character desperately needs fleshing out." A reviewer for Kirkus Reviews called Thor's prose "tangled" at times. Library Journal, however, highly recommended the novel, calling it "an assured debut" and concluding that "this international thriller will delight readers with its nonstop action, relentless suspense, strong protagonist, and wintry settings in Utah, D.C., and Switzerland. Well researched, high-voltage entertainment reminiscent of Robert Ludlum and David Morrell [...]."

Other media, notably regional titles, were just as positive. The Anniston Star wrote that Thor had recreated "a genre that has been firmly in the grasp of Tom Clancy for so long is not an easy feat. Fortunately for military intrigue devotees, Brad Thor has done just that — and on his first time out too." The Tacoma Reporter wrote "this book is one of the best entries into the military thriller genre since the early works of Tom Clancy" and that Harvath "will definitely take a place beside Cussler's Dirk Pitt and Clancy's Jack Ryan."

Named one of the 10 of The Best Political Thrillers Ever by Barnes and Noble
