= The Apostle (novel) =

2009 novel by Brad Thor

- The First Edition cover of The Apostle
- Author: Brad Thor
- Language: English
- Genre: spy novel
- Publisher: Atria Books
- Publication date: June 30th, 2009
- Media type: Hardcover, Paperback
- OCLC: 50550991
- Preceded by: The Last Patriot
- Followed by: Foreign Influence

The Apostle is a spy thriller novel written by New York Times Bestselling author Brad Thor. The Apostle is the eighth book in the Scot Harvath series.

== Plot ==
The Apostle follows the character of Scot Harvath as he is sent on a top secret assignment for the United States government to rescue Julia Gallo, a kidnapped American doctor. For her to be released, the ransom is the freeing of al-Qaeda member Mustafa Khan from Policharki Prison. Once there, Harvath discovers that this was not a simple kidnapping and that nothing is as it seems.

== Reception ==
Critical reception for The Apostle has been mixed to positive, with Publishers Weekly calling the book "less than convincing". Booklist wrote that one of the subplots "seems to be from a completely different book distracts a bit, but the main story line will keep fans of action-driven thrillers reading." BookReporter.com praised The Apostle, citing that "Thor continues to top himself with each successive novel and reaches new and even more exciting heights with THE APOSTLE."
