= Act of War (novel) =

2014 novel by Brad Thor

- First edition
- Author: Brad Thor
- Language: English
- Series: Scot Harvath
- Genre: Spy Novel
- Publisher: Emily Bestler Books
- Publication date: July 2014
- Media type: Hardcover, Paperback
- Pages: 380 (Hardcover); 434 (Paperback)
- Preceded by: Hidden Order
- Followed by: Code of Conduct

Act of War is a 2014 USA Today and New York Times bestselling thriller spy novel by American author Brad Thor and the thirteenth book in the Scot Harvath series. It was preceded by Hidden Order and was followed by Code of Conduct.

Of the book, Thor stated that his "No. 1 goal is to entertain people. I'm an entertainer and I'm gonna give them a great summer read. But if you close the book with questions or wanting to learn more about something or just a little bit smarter, than I think that's a neat kind of value add."

== Plot ==
The President of the United States Paul Porter and the United States attempt to stop a catastrophic attack on the country by the Chinese. The name of the Chinese plot is Snow Dragon.

A division of the Chinese government is planning of Snow Dragon. When one of the cell members of the plot in the United States continually fails to make contact, that division of the Chinese government sends in a known killer and super spy into the U.S. to check things out. The Chinese contracted out the completion of Snow Dragon to Muslims and other extremists in the Middle East. If the U.S. government wants any information or any hope of stopping Snow Dragon they must find anyone and everyone involved in pulling off this catastrophic event.

Meanwhile, a team of three Navy SEALS and a CIA officer that are dispatched to spy on North Korea. This is being done because intelligence has told the United States that the Chinese are conducting training missions in the country. Former Navy SEAL, Secret Service member and U.S. hero Scot Harvath. Harvath, who is working with the Carlton Group, a specialized intel and operations group, does whatever it takes to stop the Chinese and keep the U.S. safe.

== Reception ==
Tulsa World praised Act of War and compared it favorably to the television series 24. The Nashville Scene also gave a positive review, writing "With Act of War, Thor has proven once again why he is a favorite of the genre — and of the political right."
