= List of Yiddish-language poets =

Poets who wrote, or write, much or all of their poetry in the Yiddish language include:

== A ==
- Moyshe Altman

== B ==
- Rivka Basman Ben-Hayim
- Israil Bercovici
- Olexander Beyderman
- Źmitrok Biadula
- Hayim Nahman Bialik
- Benjamin J. Bialostotzky
- Rachel Boymvol
- Moishe Broderzon
- Srul Bronshtein

== D ==
- Der Nister (Pinchus Kahanovich)
- Celia Dropkin

== E ==
- David Edelstadt
- Mendel Elefant
- Israel Emiot
- Alter Esselin

== F ==
- Itzik Fefer
- Leon Feinberg
- Mikhoel Felsenbaum
- Rukhl Fishman
- Chaim Leib Fox

== G ==
- Mordechai Gebirtig
- Aaron Glanz-Leyeles, Polish native and Yiddish poet writing in the United States)
- Jacob Glatstein (alternative English spelling: Yankev Glatshteyn)
- Hirsh Glick
- Abraham Goldfaden
- Pincus Goodman
- Chaim Grade
- Eliezer Greenberg
- Uri Zvi Greenberg

== H ==
- Moyshe-Leyb Halpern
- Binem Heller
- David Hofstein

== I ==
- Reuben Iceland

== K ==
- Itzhak Katzenelson
- Emmanuil Kazakevich
- Evgeny Kissin
- Rokhl Korn
- Moyshe Kulbak
- Leib Kvitko

== L ==
- Mani Leib
- H. Leivick (1888-1962), born in Russia, emigrated to the United States; called "foremost" Yiddish poet and dramatist
- Abraham Liessin (1872-1948), American
- Moshe Lifshits (1894-1940)
- Malka Locker
- A. Lutzky

== M ==
- Leib Malach
- Itzik Manger
- Anna Margolin
- Peretz Markish
- Yoel Matveyev
- N. B. Minkoff
- Kadia Molodowsky

== O ==
- Hirsch Osherovich

== P ==
- Rikuda Potash
- Gabriel Preil (alternative English spelling: "Gabriel Preyl")

== R ==
- Abraham Regelson
- Avrom Reyzen (Abraham Reisen)
- Chava Rosenfarb
- Morris Rosenfeld

== S ==
- Boris Sandler
- Beyle Schaechter-Gottesman
- Gitl Schaechter-Viswanath
- Eliezer Schindler
- S.L. Shneiderman
- Meyer Stiker
- Fradl Shtok
- Joel Slonim
- Abraham Nahum Stencl
- Jacob Sternberg
- Abraham Sutzkever

== T ==
- Dora Teitelboim
- Malka Heifetz Tussman

== U ==
- Miriam Ulinover

== V ==
- Leyb Vaserman

== W ==
- Morris Winchevsky

== Y ==
- Yehoash (Blumgarten)

== Z ==
- Aaron Zeitlin
- Rajzel Żychlińsky

== See also ==
- List of Hebrew-language poets
