= Yiddish literature =

Yiddish literature encompasses all those belles-lettres written in Yiddish, the language of Ashkenazic Jewry which is related to Middle High German. The history of Yiddish, with its roots in central Europe and locus for centuries in Eastern Europe, is evident in its literature.

It is generally described as having three historical phases: Old Yiddish literature; Haskalah and Hasidic literature; and modern Yiddish literature. While firm dates for these periods are hard to pin down, Old Yiddish can be said to have existed roughly from 1300 to 1780; Haskalah and Hasidic literature from 1780 to about 1890; and modern Yiddish literature from 1864 to the present.

An important bibliography of Yiddish literature is the Leksikon Fun Der Nayer Yidisher Literatur (Lexicon of Modern Yiddish Literature) published by the Congress for Jewish Culture in 8 volumes between 1956 and 1981, containing a brief presentation of around 7,000 writers.

== Old Yiddish literature ==
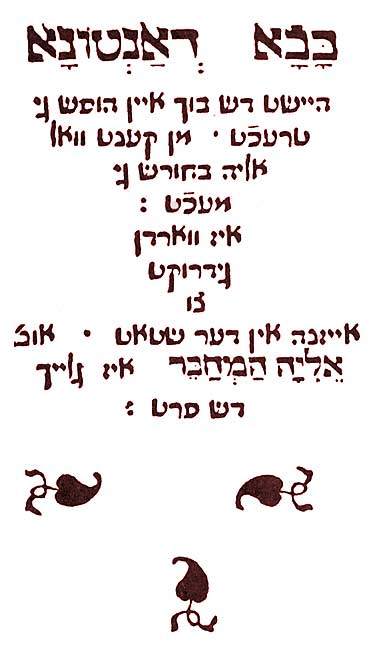
First edition of the Bovo-Bukh of 1507–1508, printed in 1541, the first non-religious Yiddish book. As the most popular chivalric romance in Yiddish, its name later passed into popular phrase as "bubbe meise"-"grandmother's tale"

Yiddish literature began with translations of and commentary on religious texts. (See article on the Yiddish language for a full description of these texts.) The most important writer of old Yiddish literature was Elijah Levita (known as Elye Bokher) who translated and adapted the chivalric romance of Bevis of Hampton, via its Italian version, Buovo d’Antona. Levita's version, called Bovo d'Antona, and later known with the title Bovo-bukh, was circulated in manuscript from 1507, then published in Isny (Germany) in 1541. This work illustrates the influence of European literary forms on emerging Yiddish literature, not only in its subject but in the form of its stanzas and rhyme scheme, an adaptation of Italian ottava rima. Nonetheless, Levita altered many features of the story to reflect Judaic elements, though they rest uneasily with the essentially Christian nature of chivalry. (For a discussion of the tension between Christian and Jewish elements in the Bovo-bukh, see chapter two of Michael Wex’s Born to Kvetch.)

A number of Yiddish epic poems appeared in the 14-15th centuries. The most important works of this genre are the Shmuel-Bukh and the Mlokhim-Bukh – chivalric romances about king David and other Biblical heroes. The stanzaic form of these poems resembles that of the Nibelungenlied. Following the example of other European epics, the Shmuel-Bukh was not simply recited, but sung or chanted to musical accompaniment; its melody was widely known in Jewish communities.

Far from being rhymed adaptations of the Bible, these old Yiddish epic poems fused the Biblical and Midrashic material with European courtly poetry, thus creating an Ashkenazic national epic, comparable to the Nibelungenlied and The Song of Roland.

Another influential work of old Yiddish literature is the Mayse-bukh (“Story Book”). This work collects ethical tales based on Hebrew and rabbinic sources, as well as folk tales and legends. Based on the inclusion of a few non-Jewish stories, scholars have deduced that the compiler lived in the area that is now western Germany during the last third of the 16th century. It was first published in 1602. These instructional stories are still read in highly religious communities, especially among the Hasidim.

A commentary written for women on the weekly parashot by Rabbi Jacob ben Isaac Ashkenazi in 1616, the Tseno Ureno (צאנה וראינה), remains a ubiquitous book in Yiddish homes to this day.

Women wrote old Yiddish literature infrequently, but several collections of tkhines (personal prayers which are not part of liturgy) were written by women such as Sara Bas-Tovim and Sarah Rebekah Rachel Leah Horowitz, both in the 18th century. The most extensive text by a woman from this era is the memoir of the 17th-18th century Glikl of Hameln, a family document that was not published until 1896.

== Hasidic and Haskalah literature ==
=== Hasidic stories ===
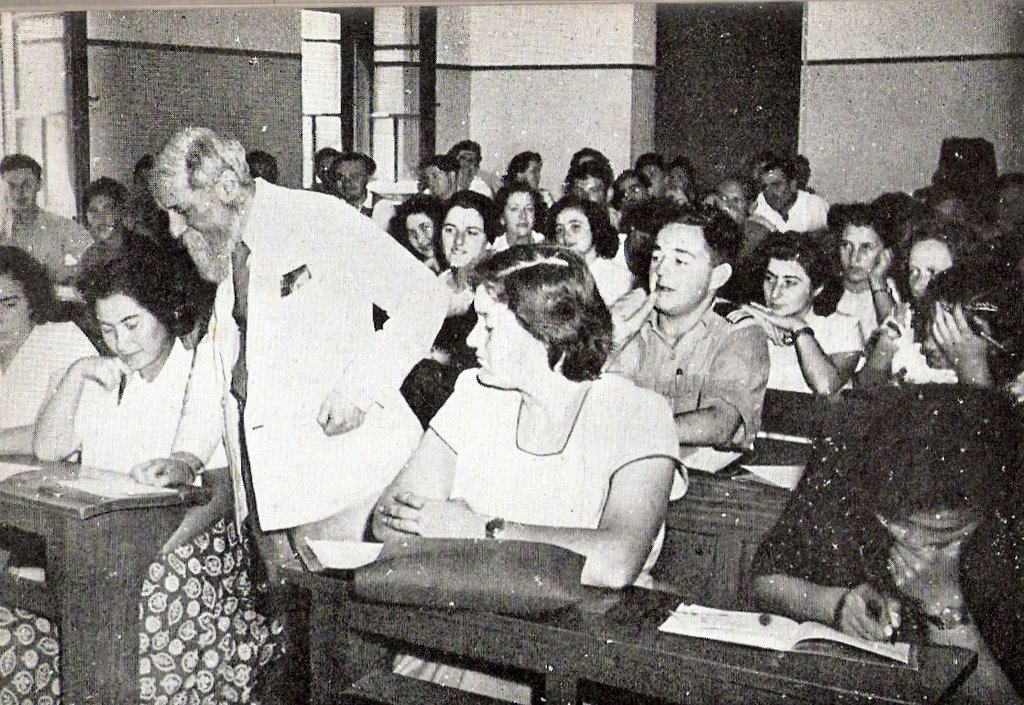
Non-Orthodox Jewish philosopher Martin Buber (1878–1965) was the first to publicise Hasidism to the wider non-Jewish world. His influential focus on its stories was criticised by Gershom Scholem for leaving aside its scholarship and adapting it to his Neo-Hasidic existentialism

The rise of Hasidic popular mysticism in the 18th century gave rise to a specific kind of literary work. Alongside its scholarly thought were hagiographic stories venerating its leadership. This gave storytelling a new centrality in Rabbinic Judaism as a form of worship, and spread the movement's appeal. These anecdotal or miraculous stories personified new Hasidic doctrines of the saintly intermediary, Divine Omnipresence, and the hidden value of the common folk. As one master related of his visit to Dov Ber of Mezeritch, "I went to see how the Maggid tied up his shoelaces". A story of the Baal Shem Tov, Hasidic founder, represents this:

The saintly prayers of the Baal Shem Tov and his close circle were unable to lift a harsh Heavenly decree they perceived one New Year. After extending the prayers beyond time, the danger remained. An unlettered shepherd boy entered and was deeply envious of those who could read the holy day's prayers. He said to God "I don't know how to pray, but I can make the noises of the animals of the field." With great feeling he cried out, "Cock-a-doodle-do, God have mercy!" Immediately, joy overcame the Baal Shem Tov and he hurried to finish the prayers. Afterwards, he explained that the heartfelt words of the shephard boy opened the Gates of Heaven, and the decree was lifted.

As Hebrew was reserved for Torah study and prayer, the vernacular Yiddish stories of different masters were compiled in Yiddish or Hebrew writing, beginning with "Shivchei HaBesht"-"In Praise of the Baal Shem Tov" (1815 Yiddish translation from Hebrew compilation of 1814). In the 20th century Martin Buber publicised Hasidism to the secular world through its stories, mediated through his own Neo-Hasidic philosophy. Previous Kabbalistic themes, accepted without emphasis in Hasidism, entered Eastern European Jewish folklore in tales of reincarnation and possession, and were commonly adapted by later secular Yiddish writers. Meanwhile, the mysticism of Hasidism as well as the culture of wider traditional Judaism, were parodied by Haskalah Yiddish literature.

=== Hasidic parables ===
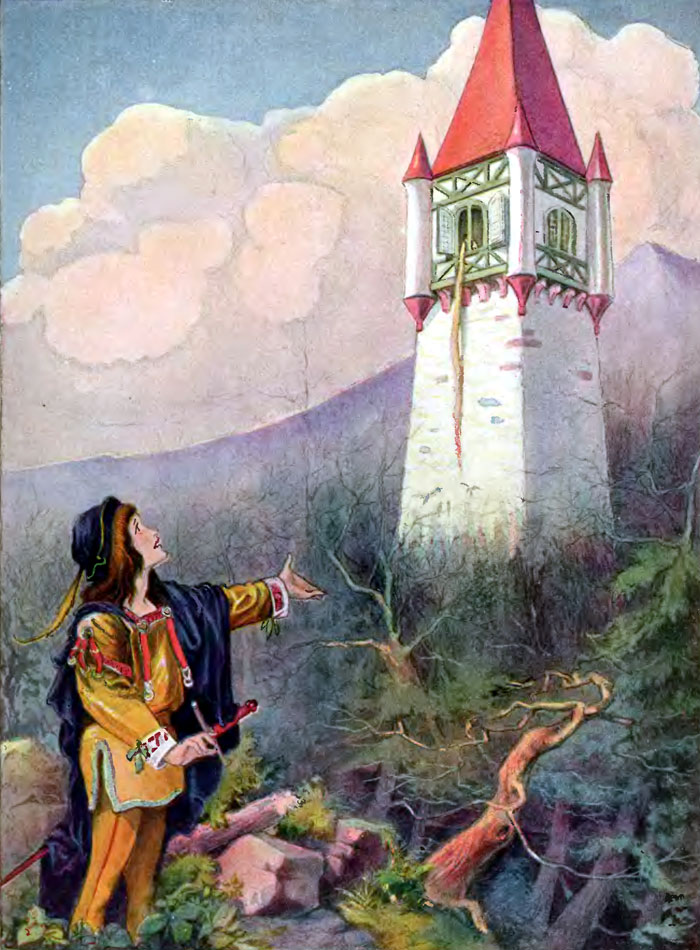
Nachman of Breslov saw sparks of holiness mixed up in the tales of the world. Lurianic Kabbalah describes the purpose of Creation as the redemption of sparks of the Shechinah. In Hasidism each person is guided to elevate their particular share. This is compared to the tale of a princess who agrees to be freed from imprisonment only by a particular prince.

Within the works of Hasidic philosophy, another storytelling form was used: insightful parables to illustrate its new mystical interpretations. The Baal Shem Tov used short, soulful analogies, alluded teachings and encouraging anecdotes in first reaching out to revive the common folk, while parables of other masters were integrated within their classic works of Hasidic thought. The distinct parables of Nachman of Breslov comprise a complete literary form that stand alone with their own commentary, in Yiddish original and Hebrew translation. In one example of former Hasidic parable, the Baal Shem Tov explained the mystical meaning of blowing the ram's horn on the New Year:

A King sent his son away from the palace to learn new skills. Regrettably, the son lost his royal ways, and forgot his home tongue. After years in exile he remembered his true calling, and desired to return to the palace. Upon approaching the gates, the guards no longer recognised the King's son and refused him entry. At that moment the King appeared on the balcony and saw the commotion of the son at the gates, but also did not recognise his son who now appeared in peasant clothing. In distress, as the son could no longer remember the royal language, he cried out a heartfelt wordless call from his soul. Immediately, the King recognised his voice and delighted in being reunited with his son.

Rabbi Nachman's 13 Sippurei Ma'asiyot Wonder-Tales of 1816 take mystical parable to a self-contained literary purpose and art. Where the analogies of other masters have direct messages, Rabbi Nachman's imaginative, intricate tales, that can involve stories within stories, offer layered mystical and devotional commentaries, or literary readings. Rabbi Nachman alluded to some meanings when he orally told each tale in Yiddish. He saw their roots in ancient Aggadic mystical articulation, by saying that this concealed form was how Kabbalah was taught orally before Shimon bar Yochai explained it, though the Tales are unique in Rabbinic literature. He took to storytelling as redemptive activity once other paths had been blocked, such as the death of his son in whom he saw Messianic potential; "the time has come to tell stories", he said. Rabbi Nachman saw his role as innovative, and his teachings focus on the redemptive scheme of rectification:

"In the tales told by the Nations of the World are hidden sparks of holiness, but the tales are confused and spiritually out of order, so that the sparks remain hidden."

The thirteenth tale, "The Seven Beggars", is the most intricate. The story told on the seventh day is missing and Rabbi Nachman said that it would only be known when the Messiah comes. The Tales, documented in Yiddish with Hebrew translation by Nathan of Breslov, amongst other Hasidic storytelling have had the strongest effect on the development of Yiddish literature.

=== Haskalah ===
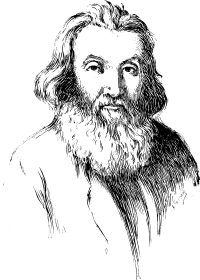
Isaac Baer Levinsohn (1788–1860), Russian-Hebrew scholar and Haskalah leader. As the "Russian Mendelssohn", he spread Haskalah ideas in the Pale of Settlement, utilised by others in Yiddish literature, that opposed insular education and satirised mysticism over rationalism

During the same years as the emergence of Hasidism, the most influential secular movement of Jews also appeared in the form of the Haskalah. This movement was influenced by the Enlightenment and opposed superstition in religious life and the antiquated education given to most Jews. They proposed better integration into European culture and society, and were strong opponents of Hasidism. Writers who used their craft to expound this view were Israel Aksenfeld, Solomon (or Shloyme) Ettinger and Isaac Mayer Dick. Aksenfeld was at first a follower of Reb Nachman of Bratslav, but later abandoned Hasidism and became a strong opponent of it. His novel Dos shterntikhl (“The head-scarf”), published in 1861, portrays the Hasidic world as intolerant and small-minded. Only five of his works were published because of opposition from Hasidic leaders. His work is realist and shows the influence of 19th century Russian literature. Ettinger was a physician who wrote plays, including what is considered the most important of the Haskalah era, “Serkele”. His satiric style shows the influence of European drama: one scholar speculates that he read Molière. Isaac Mayer Dick (1808–1893) wrote short stories which sold tens of thousands of copies in book form. His role in literary development is as significant for creating a readership for Yiddish as for the content of his work, which tends to the didactic. He also wrote in Hebrew, including the outstanding Talmudic parody, “Masseket Aniyyut” (“Tractate Poverty”).

== Modern Yiddish literature ==
=== The classic Yiddish writers ===
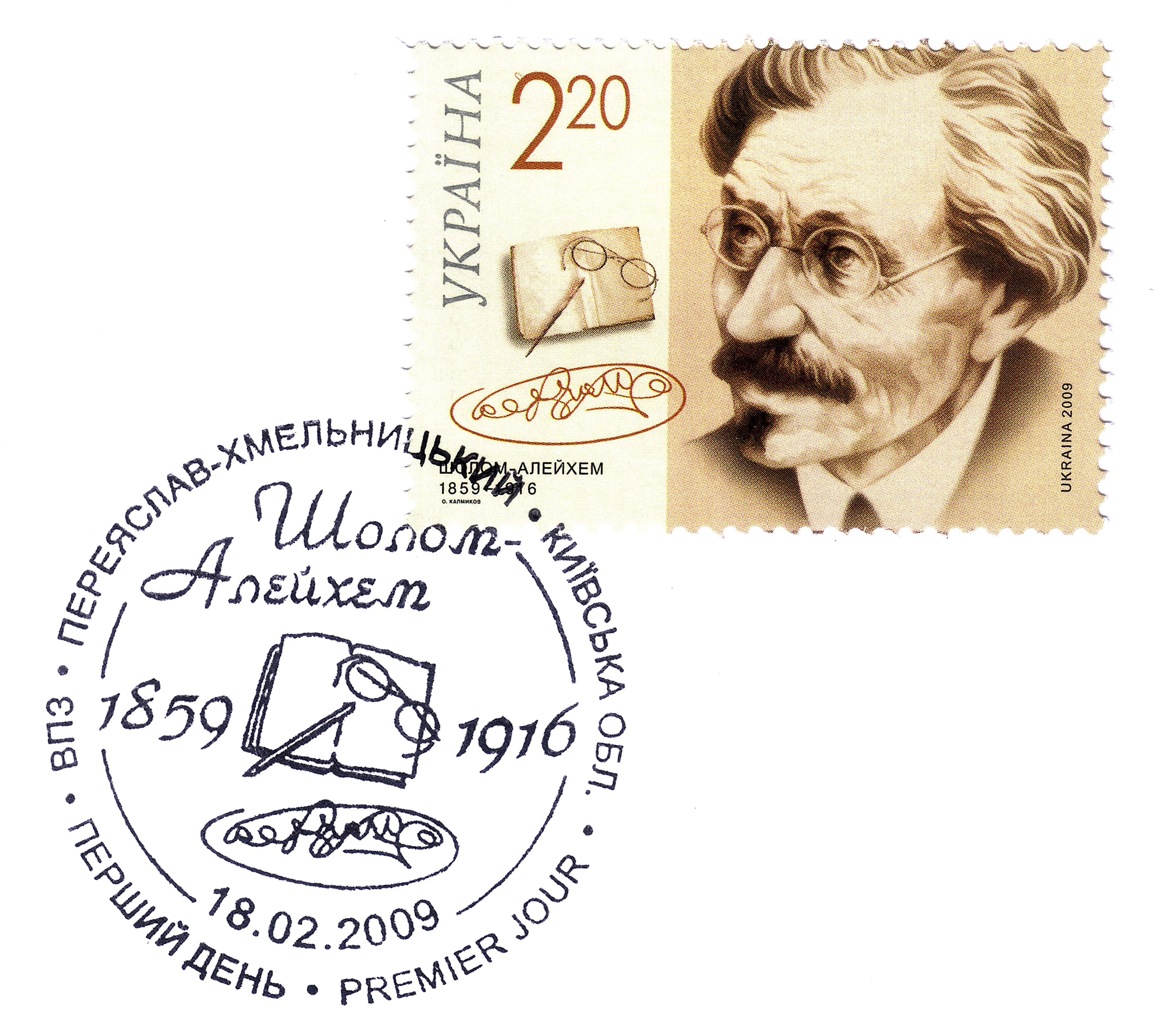
2009 Ukrainian stamp of Sholem Aleichem (1859–1916). Together with Mendele Mocher Sforim and I. L. Peretz, the three "classic" Yiddish writers, he helped found the latter 19th-century cultural and artistic Yiddish Renaissance movement of Eastern Europe.

Modern Yiddish literature is generally dated to the publication in 1864 of Sholem Yankev Abramovitsh's novel Dos kleyne mentshele ("The Little Person"). Abramovitsh had previously written in Hebrew, the language in which many proponents of the Haskalah communicated with each other, until this publication. With this novel, originally published serially in a Yiddish newspaper, Abramovitsh introduced his alter ego, the character of Mendele Moykher Sforim ("Mendel the Book Peddler"), the character who narrates this and many succeeding stories. Abramovitsh himself is often known by this name, and it appears as the "author" on several of his books, producing a complex set of relations between the author, the persona and the readership which has been explored most thoroughly by Dan Miron. Abramovitsh's work is ironic and sharp, while maintaining the voice of a folksy narrator. His work critiques corruption inside the Jewish community and that imposed on it from Russian and Polish governing institutions. He also continues the tradition of Haskalah literature with his attack on superstition and outmoded traditions such as arranged marriage. His extraordinary parody of the picaresque, Kitser masoes Binyomen hashlishi ("The Brief Travels of Benjamin the Third"), published in 1878, was his last great work and provides one of his strongest critiques of Jewish life in the Pale of Settlement.

Abramovitsh's influence lay in two factors. First, he wrote in Yiddish at a time when most Jewish thinkers tended to Hebrew or a non-Jewish language such as German. Secondly, as Dan Miron demonstrates, Abramovitsh brought Yiddish belles lettres firmly into the modern era through the use of rhetorical strategies that allowed his social reform agenda to be expressed at the highest level of literary and artistic achievement. The outpouring of Yiddish literature in modernist forms that followed Abramovitsh demonstrates how important this development was in giving voice to Jewish aspirations, both social and literary. The most important of the early writers to follow Abramovitsh were Sholem Rabinovitsh (popularly known by his alter-ego, Sholem Aleichem), and I. L. Peretz. Rabinovitsh's best-known works are the stories centering on the character Tevye the Dairyman. Written over many years and in response to the variety of Jewish catastrophes of the late 19th and early 20th centuries, the stories epitomize Rabinovitsh's style, including his signature style of "laughter through tears". I. L. Peretz brought into Yiddish a wide array of modernist techniques he encountered in his reading of European fiction. While himself politically radical, particularly during the 1890s, his fiction is enormously nuanced and allows multiple readings. His work is both simple and caustic, more psychological and more individualistic than Abramovitsh or Rabinovitsh's. For these reasons, he is considered the first true modernist in Yiddish literature. He wrote primarily stories of which "Bontshe shvayg" (Bontshe the Silent) is one of his best known. As with much of his work, it manages to convey two apparently opposing messages: sympathy for the oppressed with critique of passivity as a response to oppression.

Together, Abramovitsh, Rabinovitsh and I. L. Peretz are usually referred to as the three "classic" Yiddish writers ("di klasiker" in Yiddish). They are also nickednamed respectively the "grandfather", the "father" and the "son" of Yiddish literature. This formulation erases the fact that they were all roughly contemporaneous and are best understood as a single phenomenon rather than as distinct generational manifestations of a tradition. Nonetheless, this formulation was propounded by the classic writers themselves, perhaps as a means of investing their fledgling literary culture with a lineage that could stand up to other world literatures they admired.

=== Literary movements and figures ===
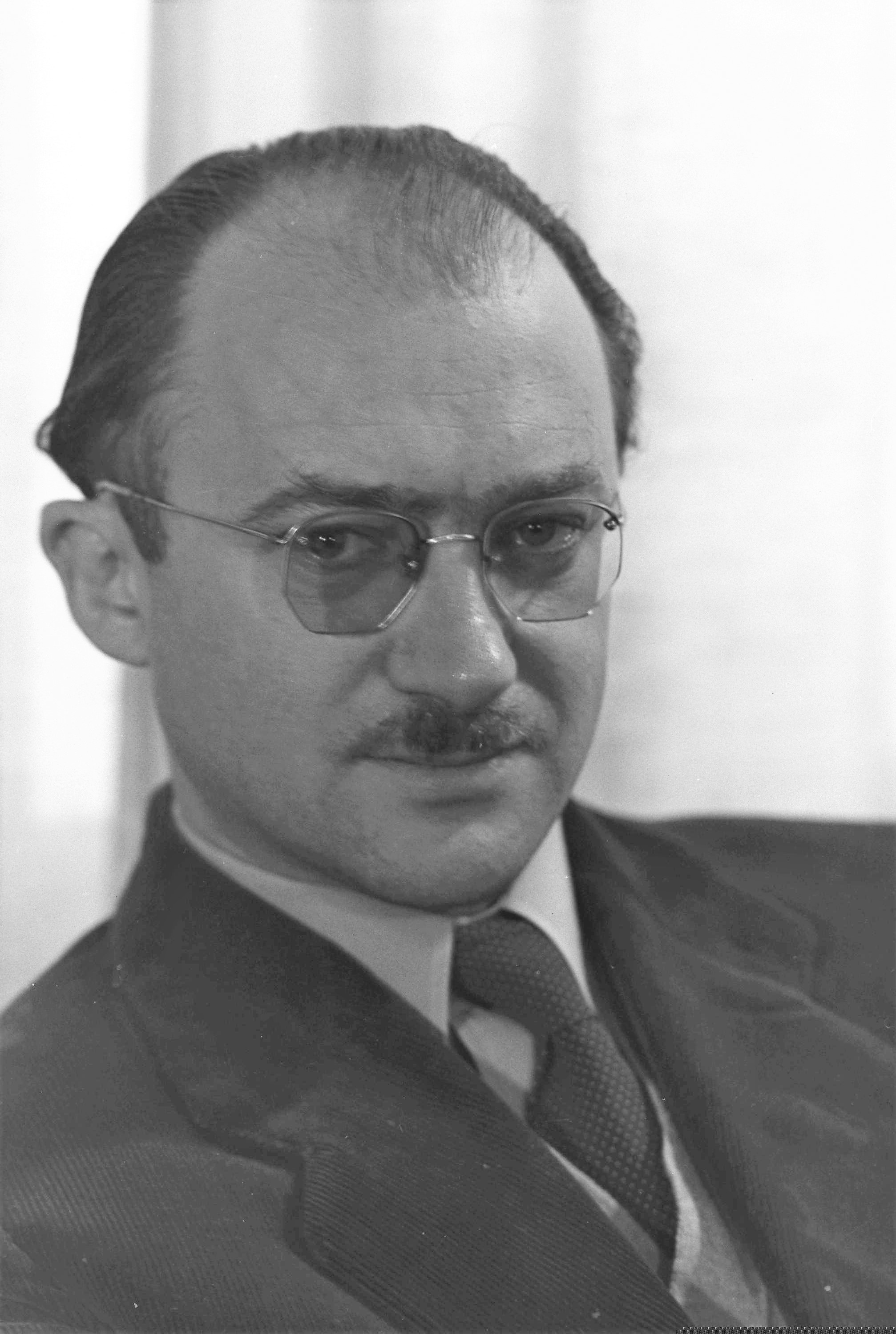
Leading poet Abraham Sutzkever (1913–2010) was among the Modernists of the 1930s Yung-Vilne ("Young Vilna") group in Vilna, a historical centre of Yiddish culture. After the War he revived Yiddish in Tel Aviv and depicted the Holocaust

Dramatic works in Yiddish grew up at first separately, and later intertwined with other Yiddish movements. Early drama, following Ettinger's example, was written by Abraham Goldfaden, and Jacob Gordin. Much of what was presented on the Yiddish stage were translations from European repertoire, and as a result much of the earliest original writing in Yiddish owes as much to German theatre as to the classic Yiddish writers.

While the three classic writers were still at their height, the first true movement in modern Yiddish literature sprang up in New York. The “Sweatshop Poets,” as this school has come to be called, were all immigrant workers who experienced first hand the inhumane working conditions in the factories of their day. The leading members of this group were Morris Rosenfeld, Morris Winchevsky, David Edelstadt and Joseph Bovshover. Their work centers on the subject of proletarian oppression and struggle, and uses the styles of Victorian verse, producing a rhetoric that is highly stylized. As a result, it is little read or understood today. Simultaneously in Warsaw a group of writers centered around I. L. Peretz took Yiddish to another level of modern experimentation; they included David Pinski, S. Ansky, Sholem Asch and I.M. Weissenberg. A later Warsaw group, “Di Chaliastre” (“The Gang”) included notables such as Israel Joshua Singer, Peretz Hirshbein, Melech Ravitch and Uri Zvi Grinberg (who went on to write most of his work in Hebrew). Like their New York counterpart, Di Yunge (“The Young Ones”), they broke with earlier Yiddish writers and attempted to free Yiddish writing, particularly verse, from its preoccupation with politics and the fate of the Jews. Prominent members of Di Yunge included Mani Leib, Moyshe-Leyb Halpern, H. Leivick, Zishe Landau and the prose writers David Ignatoff, Lamed Shapiro and Isaac Raboy. Just a few years after Di Yunge came into prominence, a group called “In-Zikh” (“Introspection”) declared itself the true avant garde, rejecting metered verse and declaring that non-Jewish themes were a valid topic for Yiddish poetry. The most important member of this group was Jacob Glatstein. Glatstein was interested in exotic themes, in poems that emphasized the sound of words, and later, as the Holocaust loomed and then took place, in reappropriations of Jewish tradition. His poem “A gute nakht, velt” (“Good Night, World,” 1938) seems to foresee the tragedy on the horizon in Eastern Europe. Also of note in interwar Warsaw's Yiddish avant-garde is S.L. Shneiderman, who published two books of poems, Gilderne Feigl (Eng: Golden Birds) in 1927 and Feyern in Shtot (Eng: Unrest in Town) in 1932. In Vilnius, Lithuania (called Vilna or Vilne by its Jewish inhabitants, and one of the most historically significant centers of Yiddish cultural activity), the group “Yung-Vilne” (“Young Vilna”) included Chaim Grade, Abraham Sutzkever and Shmerke Kaczerginski. Grade's short story “Mayn krig mit Hersh Raseyner” (“My Quarrel With Hershl Rasseyner”) is one of the classic post-Holocaust Yiddish stories, encapsulating the philosophical dilemma faced by many survivors. Sutzkever went on to be one of major poets of the 20th century.

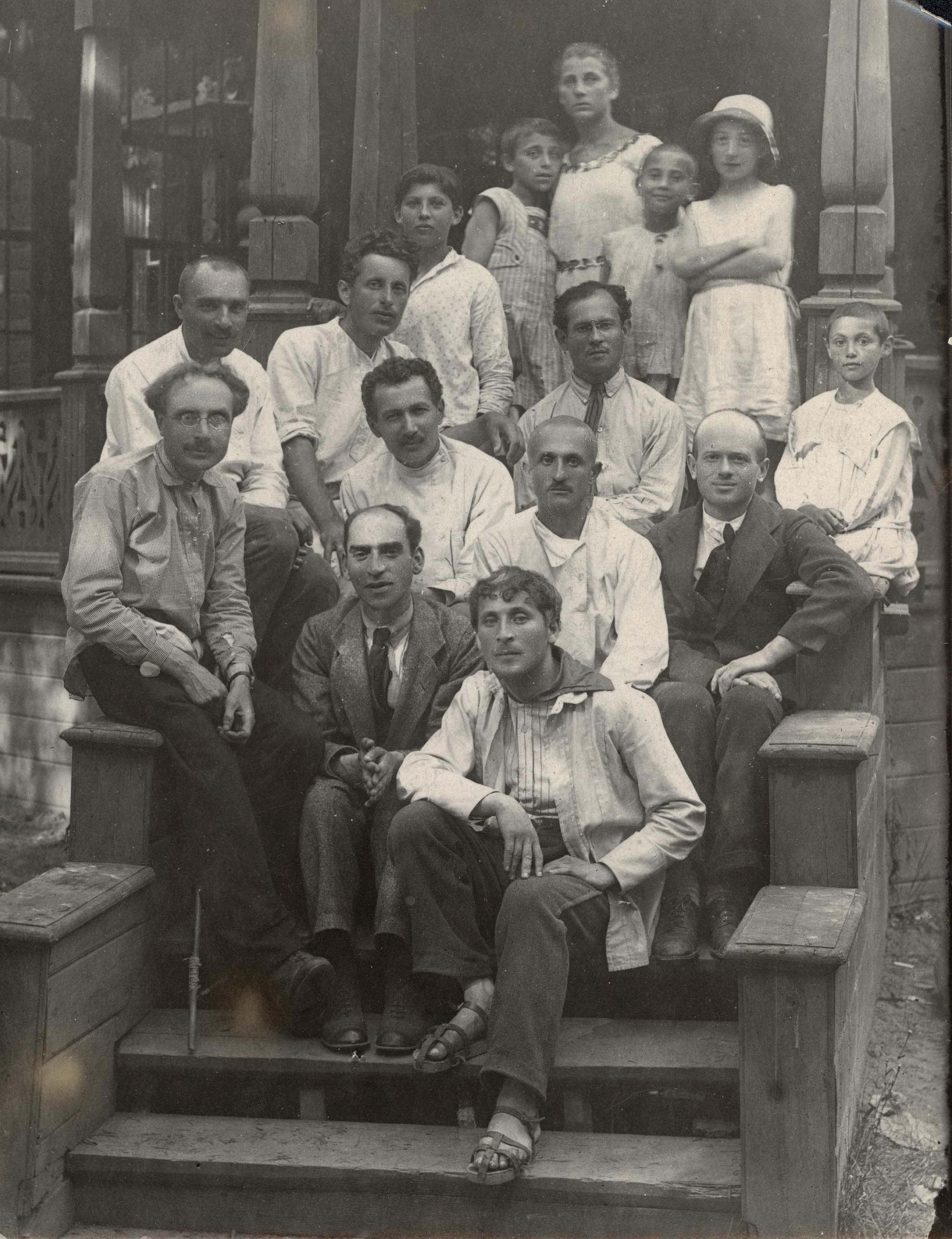
The painter Marc Chagall at the front, and the Yiddish writer Der Nister (1884–1950) behind him, with school teachers and children near Moscow in 1923. The writer's pseudonym, "The Hidden One", reflected his interest in symbols and esoteric Jewish ideas. He returned to Russia to join the Yiddish flowering, but fell victim to the Purges.

During the radical turn of the 1930s, a group of writers clustered around the U. S. Communist Party came to be known as “Di Linke” (“The Left Wing”). This group included Moishe Nadir, Malka Lee and Ber Grin. In Canada, a similar group was known as the Proletariat school of writers, exemplified by Yudica. In the Soviet Union, Yiddish literature underwent a dramatic flowering, with such greats as David Bergelson, Der Nister, Peretz Markish and Moyshe Kulbak. Several of these writers were murdered during a Stalinist purge known as the Night of the Murdered Poets (August 12–13, 1952), including Itzik Fefer and Leib Kvitko. Bergelson is considered by many an underrated genius whose work in the modernist novel may be among the most interesting examples of the form. Important Soviet writers who escaped persecution include Moyshe Altman, Ikhil Shraybman, Note Lurie, Eli Schechtman, Shike Driz, Rivke Rubin, Shira Gorshman, and others. There appears to have been no rhyme or reason to explain why certain writers were not persecuted, as all these writers pursued similar themes in their writing and participated in similar groupings of Jewish intellectuals.

Certain male writers also did not associate with a particular literary group, or did so for a short time before moving on to other creative ethics. Among these were Itzik Manger, whose clever re-imaginings of Biblical and other Jewish stories are accessible and playful but deeply intellectual. Other writers in this category are Joseph Opatoshu, I. B. Singer (who is always called “Bashevis” in Yiddish to distinguish him from his older brother), I. J. Singer and Aaron Zeitlin.

Many of the writers mentioned above who wrote during and after the 1940s responded to the Holocaust in their literary works—some wrote poetry and stories while in ghettos, concentration camps, and partisan groups, and many continued to address the Holocaust and its aftereffects in their subsequent writing. Yiddish writers known best for their writings about the Holocaust include Yitzhak Katzenelson, S.L. Shneiderman, Y. Shpigl, and Katsetnik.

=== Female authors in Yiddish literature ===
An interesting feature of Yiddish literature in its most active years (1900–1940) is the presence of numerous women writers who were less involved in specific movements or tied to a particular artistic ideology. Writers such as Celia Dropkin, Anna Margolin, Kadia Molodowsky, Esther Kreitman, Katie Brown and Esther Shumiatcher Hirschbein created bodies of work that do not fit easily into a particular category and which are often experimental in form or subject matter. Margolin's work pioneered the use of assonance and consonance in Yiddish verse. She preferred off-rhymes to true rhymes. Dropkin introduced a highly charged erotic vocabulary and shows the influence of 19th century Russian poetry. Kreitman, the sister of I. J. and I. B. Singer, wrote novels and short stories, many of which were sharply critical of gender inequality in traditional Jewish life.

In the developing Yiddish literary scene in Europe and the United States in the first decades of the twentieth century, women writers were regarded by literary critics as a rare phenomenon, at the same time that editors of newspapers and journals, especially those of the socialist and anarchist press, were eager to publish women's work, as a hallmark of modernity and in the hope of boosting circulation; however, a few leading male writers and editors, including Avrom Reyzen and Aaron Glanz-Leyeles, expressed the view that women writers had a particular contribution to make to the emerging American Yiddish literature. Women writers such as Yente Serdatzky and Fradl Shtok, found a limited degree of recognition for their work but ultimately were out of step with their male literary peers and came to an impasse in their writing careers. Shtok, at first known for her poetry, especially for being among the first Yiddish poets to write sonnets, garnered disappointing reviews for her collection of short stories (Gezammelte ertseylungen, 1919) that were innovative in the way they incorporated the subjectivity, including erotic desires, of female characters. Writers such as Rywka Braun-Nyman reflect an interest in poeticizing manifestations of survivor guilt within Holocaust literature in a nature that is first-hand.

=== Isaac Bashevis Singer and the Nobel Prize ===
The awarding of the Nobel Prize in Literature to Isaac Bashevis Singer in 1978 helped cement his reputation as one of the great writers of world literature. Many readers of Yiddish, however, are convinced that there are many finer writers among Yiddish literature, including his brother. Chaim Grade believed himself overlooked by the English-speaking world. Cynthia Ozick's short story "Envy; or, Yiddish in America" implies a similar emotion on the part of a Yiddish poet, generally taken to be based on Jacob Glatstein. Some Yiddish critics complained of the excessive sex and superstition in Singer's work, which they felt brought Yiddish literature in general into disrepute. In addition, Singer's habit of presenting himself to the American press as the last or only Yiddish writer was irksome to the dozens of writers still living and working at the time. But in spite of these squabbles (which to some extent continue, years after the death of the protagonists), most scholars of Yiddish today would agree that the awarding of the Nobel Prize to Singer brought an unprecedented amount of attention to Yiddish literature, and has served to heighten interest in the field generally. Many scholars believe it to be a justified prize on the basis of the part of Singer's oeuvre that is available in translation, which represents his most accomplished works.

=== Contemporary writing in Yiddish and influenced by Yiddish literature ===
The last prewar European-born writers who published or are still publishing in the early 21st century include the Canadian authors Chava Rosenfarb, Simcha Simchovitch (1921–2017) and Grunia Slutzky-Kohn (1928–2020); Israeli writers including Tzvi Ayznman (1920–2015), Aleksander Shpiglblat (1927–2013), Rivka Basman Ben-Hayim, Yitzkhok Luden, Mishe Lev (1917–2013), Yente Mash (1922–2013), Tzvi Kanar (1929–2009), Elisheva Kohen-Tsedek (born 1922) and Lev Berinsky (born 1939); and American poet-songwriter Beyle Schaechter-Gottesman, and poets and prose masters Yonia Fain (1913–2013) and Moshe Shklar (editor of the Los Angeles Yiddish literary periodical Khezhbn; 1920–2014), as well as the prolific feuilletonist and playwright Miriam Hoffman. Writers of the "younger" postwar born generation comprising those born in the late 1940s through 1960s (many hailing from the former Soviet Union) include Alexander Belousov (1948–2004), Mikhoel Felsenbaum, Daniel Galay, Moyshe Lemster, Boris Sandler (who edited the Yiddish "Forverts" edition of The Jewish Daily Forward from 1998 to 2016), Velvl Chernin, Zisye Veytsman, Heershadovid Menkes (pen name of Dovid Katz), and Boris Karloff (pen name of Dov-Ber Kerler, editor of "Yerusholaymer Almanakh"). A younger generation of writers who began to come to the fore in the 21st century includes poets Gitl Schaechter-Viswanath, Yermiyahu Ahron Taub and Yoel Matveyev in the US, Yisroel Nekrasov in Saint Petersburg, Haike Beruriah Wiegand in London, Thomas Soxberger in Vienna, and the prose writers Boris Kotlerman in Israel and Gilles Rozier (editor of "Gilgulim") in Paris. The earlier works of some of the younger generation authors were collected in the anthology "Vidervuks" (regrowth), published in 1989. Recent works of many of contemporary authors appeared in 2008 in Paris (Gilgulim: naye shafungen) and Jerusalem (Yerusholaymer Almanakh).

A new generation of Yiddish writers has emerged from the Hasidic and Haredi movements of contemporary Orthodoxy. The author known only by the pseudonym Katle Kanye writes blistering satire of current halakhic literature as well as poetry and thoughtful commentary on Hasidic life. Another example of a Haredi Yiddish blog-writer is Natirlich. Spy thrillers in Yiddish have become a popular genre within Hasidic communities.

European literatures have had a strong influence on Yiddish literature, but until the late 20th century there was little return flow into English, except through bilingual writers who chose to write in English, such as Anzia Yezierska and Ab Cahan. The poet Irena Klepfisz, who was born to Polish-speaking Jewish parents in Nazi-occupied Poland and learned Yiddish in school after immigrating to the United States, is influenced by the language in her work and also translates poetry from the Yiddish.

Currently, many young writers with little knowledge of Yiddish have been influenced by Yiddish literature in translation, such as Nathan Englander and Jonathan Safran Foer. An exception is Dara Horn, who has studied both Yiddish and Hebrew and draws on both of these traditions in her English-language novels.

The last Yiddish language writers in the former Soviet Union were Aleksandr Bejderman in Odessa and Yoysef Burg in Chernivtsi, both of whom are deceased.

Literary works written originally in other languages continue to be translated and published in Yiddish. UNESCO's Index Translationum database lists 98 foreign-language books published in Yiddish translation since circa 1979, in a number of countries including Israel, the US, Romania, Germany, and the USSR.

== See also ==
- California Institute for Yiddish Culture and Language
- Hebrew literature
- Jewish political movements
- List of Yiddish language poets
- Shtetl
- Yiddish Book Center
- Yiddish Renaissance
- Yiddish theatre
