= Eliezer Greenberg =

American poet (1896–1977)

Eliezer Greenberg (December 13, 1896 – June 2, 1977) was a Bessarabian-born Jewish-American Yiddish poet and literary critic.

== Life ==
Greenberg was born on December 13, 1896, in Lipcani, Russian Empire, the son of Ezekiel Greenberg and Ethel Haselov.

Greenberg attended a religious primary school and studied under Haskalah follower Itsik Shkolnik. He also studied secular subjects. His teachers included townsmen and writers Eliezer Steinbarg, Jacob Sternberg, and Moyshe Altman. He immigrated to America in 1913, initially living in Boston then in Brockton. He worked in a leather workshop at that time. In 1921, he began studying in the University of Michigan in Ann Arbor and worked as a teacher in Jewish schools. He settled in New York City in 1927. His writings first appeared in 1919 in Jacob Marinoff's Der Groyser Kundes and in Di Naye Velt. He then published his songs, poems, and essays in multiple publications.

Greenberg's earliest works dealt with New York City, both the architectural wonders of the Woolworth Building and the Brooklyn Bridge and the abject poverty of the tenements and workers. He especially focused on the latter during the Great Depression. In the years after the Holocaust, he wrote about the tragedy and destruction of the European Jewish community, including of his native city of Lipcani he maintained affectionate memories of, and of the decline of Yiddish culture in America. He wrote critical studies about Yiddish poets Moyshe-Leyb Halpern, Jacob Glatstein, and H. Leivick. From 1945 to 1949, he and Elias Schulman edited the literary magazine Getseltn, which included works from a wide range of Yiddish poets.

Greenberg published his first volume of Yiddish poetry, Gasn un Evenyus (Streets and Avenues) in 1928. This was followed by Fun Umetum (From Everywhere) in 1934, Fisherdorf (Fishing Village) in 1938, Di Lange Nakht (The Long Night) in 1946, Baynakhtiker Dialog (Night Dialogue), Eybiker Dorsht (Eternal Thirst) in 1968, and Gedenkshaft (Memorabilia) in 1974. He and Irving Howe edited several anthologies of translations from Yiddish to English, including A Treasury of Yiddish Stories in 1954, Five Yiddish Poets in 1962, A Treasury of Yiddish Poetry in 1969, Voices From the Yiddish in 1972, Yiddish Stories Old and New in 1974, Selected Stories of I.L. Peretz in 1974, and Ashes Out of Hope in 1977. The latter work included fiction by Soviet Yiddish writers.

Greenberg received the Harry Kovner Award for Yiddish Poetry from the Jewish Book Council in 1953, the Jewish Book Council of America Award for Poetry in 1954, and the Jacob Fichman Poetry Prize from the Union of Bessarabian Jews in Israel in 1967. He was director of Yiddish Press Relations for the American Jewish Committee, a founder and vice-president of the Yiddish PEN Club, and a member of the Workmen's Circle and the I. L. Peretz Yiddish Writers Union. In 1926, he married Eva Brown.

Greenberg died in the Cabrini Health Care Center from a long illness on June 2, 1977.
