= Moyshe Nadir =

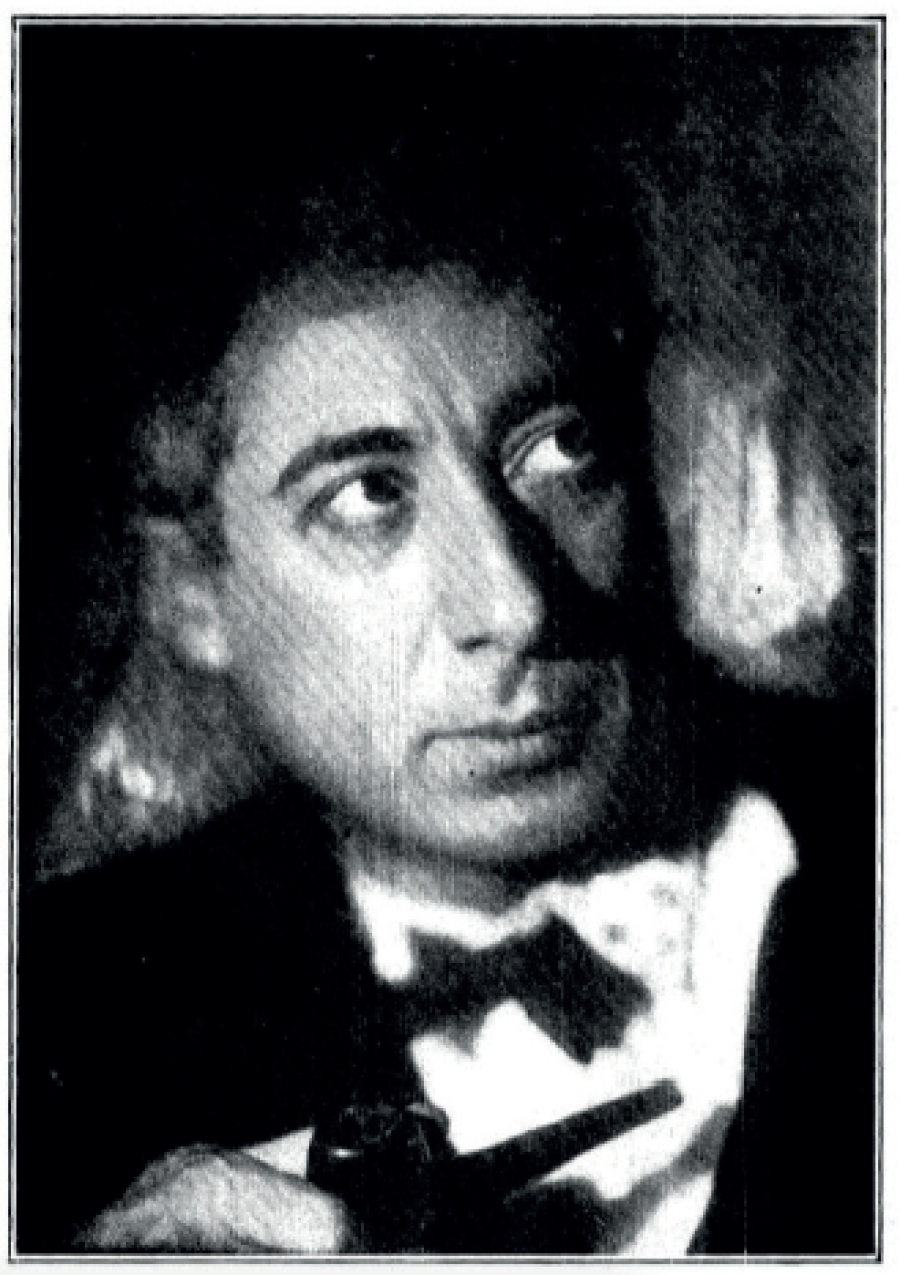
Nadir c. 1929

Yitzchak Rayz (1885, Narayiv – 1943, Woodstock), better known by his pen name Moyshe Nadir (Yiddish: משה נאַדיר; also transliterated "Moishe") was an American Yiddish language writer and satirist. Rayz was born in the town of Narayiv, in eastern Galicia, then Austro-Hungary. He died in 1943, in Woodstock, New York.

== Biography ==
In 1898, at the age of 13, Rayz immigrated to New York and adopted the Americanized name Isaac Reiss. Within a few years his work was published widely in the New York Yiddish press, under a variety of pseudonyms, including Rinnalde Rinaldine, Dilensee Mirkarosh, Der Royzenkavalir, Doctor Hotzikl, and, finally, Moishe Nadir. The name "Nadir" is a Yiddish expression meaning "here you are" or "that's for you," but can also mean "take this and choke on it."

As a teenager, he wrote for Der Groyser Kundes (The Big Prankster) and later co-edited Der Yiddisher Gazlon (The Yiddish Bandit) with Jacob Adler. He wrote for an assortment of Communist Yiddish publications including the Frayhayt (Freedom) newspaper and its successor Morgn Frayhayt (Morning Freedom) and the magazines Der Signal (The Signal) and Der Hammer (The Hammer). When his sharp-tongued theater reviews caused him to be banned from theatrical productions, he resorted to attending plays in disguise. His own plays were performed by Maurice Schwartz’s Yiddish Art Theater, Zuni Maude and Yosl Cutler's Modicut puppet theater, Artef (Arbeter Teater Faraband, Workers Theater Alliance) and the Federal Theater Project. Among his better known poems are the erotic Vilde Royzen (Wild Roses, 1915) and his 1932 Rivington Strit (Rivington Street).

After a long association with the Freiheit and the Morgen Freiheit, Rayz began to distance himself from the Communist cause with the onset of the show trials in the Soviet Union and publicly broke with the Morgn Frayhayt in the wake of the Molotiv-Ribbentrop Pact. He set out his reasons in “Di, vos blayben mit der Morgn Frayhayt” (“Those who stay with the Morgn Frayhayt”) in response to Morgn Frayhayt editor Moissaye Olgin's “Di vos gayen avek” (“Those who leave”). Rayz discusses his relationship to the Communist Party in his posthumous Moyde Ani (Confessions).

== Published works ==
=== Yiddish originals ===
- "Der Rebbe Elimelech" is a Yiddish song published in 1927 and is loosely based on the song Old King Cole.
- https://archive.org/search.php?query=moishe%20nadir

=== English translations ===
- From Man to Man ("fun mentsh tsu mentsh") (2006) (This includes an extensive biographical essay by the translator, Harvey Fink.)
- For a 1920 collection of his literary improvisations in English translation see Peh-el-peh (Face to Face), translated by Joseph Kling, Pagan Publishing Co., New York.
- Anthologised in Proletpen : America's rebel Yiddish poets / edited by Amelia Glaser and David Weintraub; translated by Amelia Glaser; with illustrations by Dana Craft; special editorial assistance from Yankl Salant. University of Wisconsin Press 2005
- Messiah in America ("Moshiekh in Amerika"), Farlag Press (2018) http://www.farlag.com/messiah-in-america
- Puppet Play: In the other World ("Marioneten Shpil: In Yener Velt") https://archive.org/details/InTheOtherWorld

== See also ==
- Yiddish literature
- Yiddish language
- Yiddish Renaissance
- List of Yiddish language poets
- Yiddish theatre
