= Srul Bronshtein =

Romanian writer (1913–1943)

Srul Bronshtein (Yiddish: סראָל בראָנשטײן; c. 1913–1943) was a Romanian and Soviet Yiddish-language poet.

== Biography ==
Srul Bronshtein was born into a Jewish baker's family in the village of Ştefăneşti, Bessarabia Governorate — at the time a southwestern province of Imperial Russia (Ştefăneşti is currently in Floreşti district, Moldova). As a child, he received a traditional cheder education.

In the 1930s, Bronshtein lived in Bucharest, where he debuted with poetry and critical essays in the Yiddish-language literary periodicals of Romania. Among other magazines, he published in Di Vokh ("The Week"), edited by prose writer Moyshe Altman, and in Shoybn ("Windows"), edited by the poet and theatrical director Yankev Shternberg. Shternberg organized a circle of Yiddish literati, predominantly from Bessarabia, which in addition to Srul Bronshtein included poets Tzvi Tzelman, Zishe Bagish and prose writers Ikhil Shraybman, Arn Ocnitzer, Azriel Roitman, among others.

It was in Bucharest that Bronshtein's first collection of Yiddish verse was published in 1938, entitled Moldove, mayn heym ("Moldavia, my home"). It was followed by the second collection Kh'ob geefnt breyt di toyern ("I've opened wide the gates") a year later. A large selection of his poetry appeared in the Yiddish-language periodicals of Bucharest throughout the 1930s, including Shpitol-Lider ("Hospital poems"), Fabrik-Lider ("Factory poems"), Tfise-Lider ("Prison poems"), the ballad Malkutse Der Gasnfroys Farveynt Harts ("The cried-out heart of the street girl Malcuţa"), and a long poem, Banakhtike Asfalt-Leygers ("Nocturnal Asphalt Pavers").

In 1940 Bessarabia was annexed by the Soviet Union, and Bronshtein, as with almost all other Bessarabian writers, moved back home. Later in World War II, he was mobilized into the Red Army at the outbreak of the German invasion (June 1941) and suffered a penetrating lung wound from shrapnel the following year. Bronshtein died of the wound in winter 1943 at a military hospital in Tashkent, Uzbek SSR (present-day Uzbekistan).

Despite his humble, provincial background, Bronshtein's poetics are pointedly urbane, with typical modernistic themes of anomie,

Kh'shlep arum a zak mit beyner
Af di gasn tsu farkoyfn
Keyner ober vil ba mir di skhoyre koyfn,
Keyner.
Pardon, kh'ob yo a koyne af ir getrofn.
Darf er ober beyner hobn emesdike toyte,
Nit vi mayne, lebedike un bahoyte...

— I. Shraybman, "Zibn yor mit zibn khadoshim" (p.261)
Translation:

I drag around a bag of bones
In the streets to sell,
No one, however, wants to buy it,
No one.
Pardon, I did encounter a customer.
But he needs real bones, dead in earnest,
Not like mine, alive and still in flesh...

== Published works ==
- Moldove, mayn heym: lider un poemen (מאָלדאָװע, מײַן הײם; "Moldova, my home: verses and long poems"), illustrated by А. Lebas, Bucharest, 1938 Harvard University Library, under Brunstein, S.
- Kh'ob geefnt breyt di toyern (כ'האָב געעפֿנט ברײט די טױערן; "I've opened wide the gates", poetry), Bucharest, 1939

== Critical works about Bronshtein ==
- Ikhil Shraybman, Zibn yor mit zibn khadoshim (יחיאל שרײַבמאַן, זיבן יאָר מיט זיבן חדשים; "Seven years with seven months, an autobiographic novel"), Yiddish and Russian; Chapter 6: biographical information on Srul Bronshtein), Editura Ruxandra, Chişinău, 2003
- Sarah Shpitalnik, Bessarabskiy Stil' (Сара Шпитальник, Бессарабский стиль; "Bessarabian style"), Russian-language bibliographic information on Bessarabian Yiddish authors, Editura Ruxandra, Chişinău, 2005
