= Reuben Iceland =

American poet

Reuben Iceland (Yiddish: ראובן אײַזלאַנד, romanized: Ruvn Ayzland; April 29, 1884 – June 18, 1955) was a Galician-born Jewish-American Yiddish poet, translator, and journalist.

== Life ==
Iceland was born on April 29, 1884, in Radomyśl Wielki, Galicia. He began writing Hebrew poems in 1900 and Yiddish poems in 1904. He immigrated to America in September 1903.

In 1907, Iceland helped form the literary movement Di Yunge. A principal contributor to the movement's periodicals and anthologies, he was editor of Literatur un Leben in 1915 and co-editor of Der Inzl with Mani Leib from 1915 to 1926. His works included the 1922 Fun Mayn Zumer (From My Summer), which was a transitional work from his earlier impressionistic poems to a tonally more mystical, the poem Tarnow, which captured the Jewish community of the town of Tarnów, and the 1954 Fun Unzer Frillig (From Our Spring), which included his reminiscences of Di Yunge.

In 1918, Iceland became a regular contributor for Der Tog, followed by Der Tog Morgn Zhurnal. He translated Heinrich Heine's series of poems from Die Nordsee ("North Sea") and four volumes of prose by Heine into Yiddish. He also translated Herman Bang's novels De uden Fædreland ("Without a Fatherland") and Fratelli Bedini. He translated poems from, among others, Richard Dehmel, Max Dauthendey, Friedrich Nietzsche, and Robert Louis Stevenson. He also translated works from Chinese poets, including Su Dongpo, Du Fu, and the Zhuangzi. He wrote a drama called R’ Asher Kahane (Rabbi Asher Kahane).

Iceland came to know poet Anna Margolin when he was thirty-five. They became involved and lived together for 30 years, until her death in 1952. she inspired him to write Fun Mayn Zumer, which depicted their emotional struggle before finding fulfillment in each other. His memoir Fun Unzer Frillig included a lengthy biographical sketch of her.

Ill for the last few years of his life, Iceland retired from his journalistic activities and settled in Miami Beach, Florida, where he published his last book. He died there on June 18, 1955. He was buried in New York.
