= Fradl Shtok =

American poet

Fradl Stock
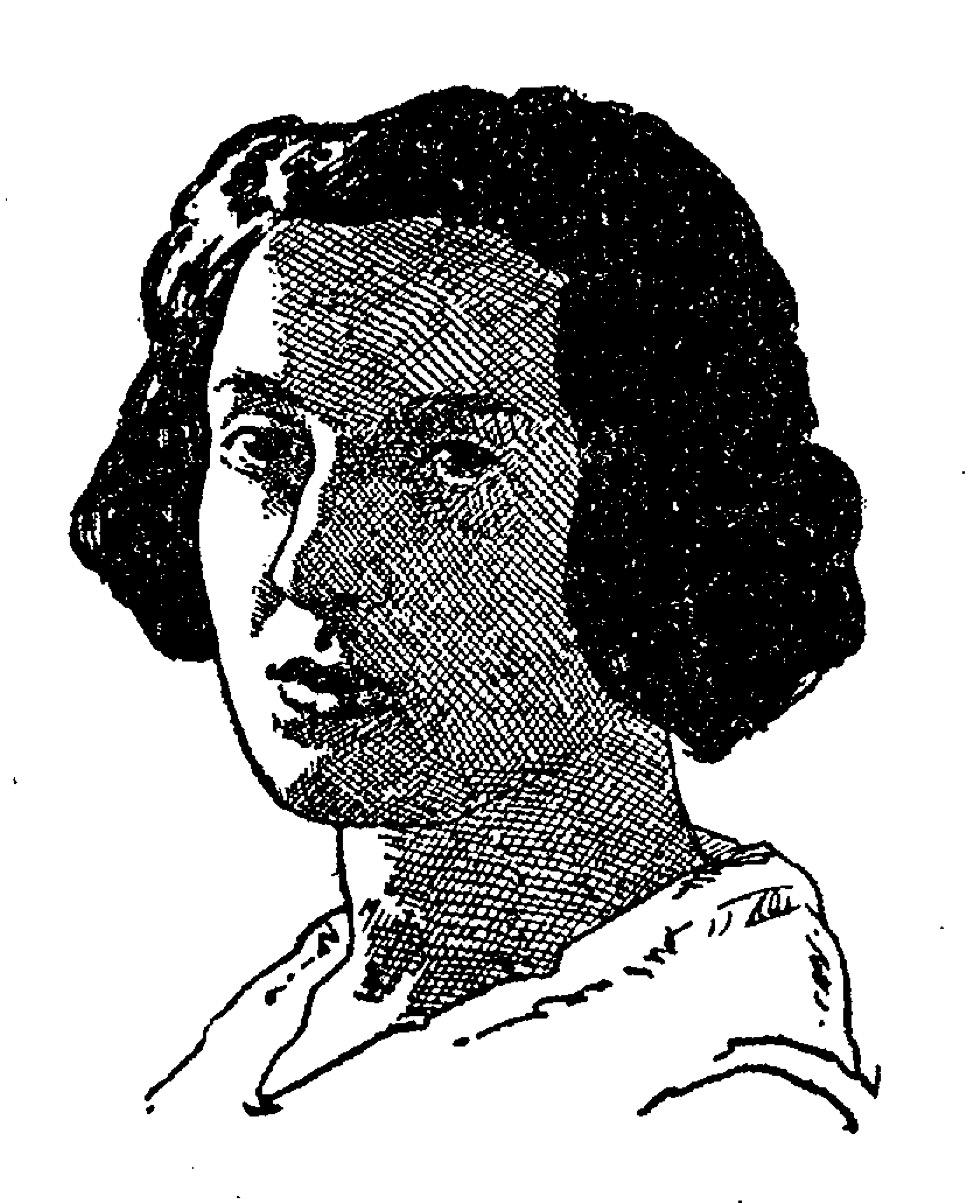
- Born: 1888; Skala-Podilska
- Died: 1990 (aged 101–102)
- Occupations: Poet and writer
- Known for: Yiddish poetry

Fradl Shtok (Yiddish: פֿראַדעל שטאָק) (also Fradel Stock, 1888 – 1990?) was a Jewish-American Yiddish-language poet and writer, who immigrated to the United States from Galicia, Austria-Hungary, at the age of 18 or 19. She is known as one of the first Yiddish poets to use the sonnet form; and her stories, which were less well received than her poems in her lifetime, have since been recognized as innovative for their exploration of subjectivity, and, in particular, for their depiction of Jewish female characters at odds with traditional roles and expectations.

== Biography ==
Fradl Shtok was born in the shtetl, or small town, of Skala, in eastern Galicia, in the Austro-Hungarian Empire (today in Ukraine). Her mother died when she was one year old, and her father went to prison a few years later, for his part in the murder of a man during a brawl; after that she was raised by an aunt. Shtok was a talented student, played the violin, and could recite from the works of the classic German poets Goethe and Schiller.

In 1907, she immigrated to the United States, settling in New York City. Beginning in 1910, she published poems and stories in Yiddish periodicals and anthologies, mostly in publications of the literary group known as Di Yunge. In 1914, Shtok was among a group of writers led by Joseph Opatoshu, who broke away from Di Yunge out of a philosophic disagreement, and published their own anthology, Di naye heym (The new home), edited by Opatoshu; not satisfied with their colleagues' emphasis on literary playfulness, the writers of Di naye heym were interested in exploring the ties between their own milieu and the past generation. The anthology included a cycle of eight sonnets by Shtok.

Shtok was recognized in her own time and later as a significant lyric voice in Yiddish. Jacob Glatstein wrote appreciatively in retrospect: "Her poetry is elegant, original ... masterful ... capable of inscribing a beautiful chapter into Yiddish poetry". In an analysis of two major anthologies of Yiddish poetry published in the early 20th century, the scholar Kathryn Hellerstein notes that "Shtok stands out as an innovator in verse forms, enriching the meters and stanzas of Yiddish poetry." In Moyshe Bassin's anthology of Yiddish poetry over five centuries (Finf hundert yor yidishe poezye; 1917), volume two (covering the modern period), which included only a narrow selection of female poets (nine of the total 95 poets), Shtok was by far the best represented. A generous selection of Shtok's poems also appeared in Ezra Korman's 1928 anthology of Yiddish poetry by women from the 16th century to the contemporary era (Yidishe dikhterins), which included 70 women poets.

In 1918, she married a photographer Samuel (Simcha) Zinn and took his name, the couple divorced 5 years later.

In 1919, Fradl Shtok published a collection of 38 stories, Gezamelte ertsehlungen (Collected stories). Most of the stories are set in a shtetl that resembles, or, in some instances, is directly or indirectly identified as her hometown Skala, while ten stories take place in a Jewish immigrant milieu in the United States. Contemporary reviews of the book were mixed, with one or two striking a particularly negative tone.

Subsequently, Shtok withdrew from the Yiddish literary scene. In 1927 she published a novel in English, Musicians Only, which received little positive attention from critics in either English or Yiddish. A review in the New York Times criticized the novel for its "remarkably bad" writing but still admitted that it "assumes over the reader an unwilling fascination" thanks to its emotional authenticity.

In 1942 Shtok was in contact with Abraham Cahan, editor of the Yiddish newspaper Forverts (The Forward), and he received from her a new story in Yiddish, "A soycher fun fel" (A fur merchant), which appeared in the newspaper on November 19, 1942.

Her correspondence with Cahan indicated that she was at that time going by the name of Frances Zinn, and was living in California.

There is no certainty about Shtok's later life. Until recently, it was believed that the writer died in 1958, but Yiddish literature researcher (and translator of Shtok's works) Allison Schachter discovered that – once again – the people mixed the writer up with other woman of the same name. Thanks to the declassification of some documents and their introduction into the public domain, it was possible to reconstruct her biography. According to the latest sources, we know that Shtok died in Rockland State Hospital in 1990.

== Publications ==
Books

- 1919: Gezamelte ertsehlungen [stories]. New York: Farlag "Naye Tsayt"
- 1927: Musicians Only [novel]. New York: Pelican

Stories

- November 19, 1942: A soykher fun fel. Forverts

Plays

- 1923: Der Amerikaner (The American)
- 1925: The Savior
- 1927: A Prince Too Many
- 1928: Millstones

== Works in translation ==
Stories

- "The Archbishop" (Der erts-bishof), translated by Joachim Neugroschel. In: Neugroschel (Ed./Trans.), No Star Too Beautiful: Yiddish Stories from 1382 to the Present. New York: Norton, 2002. p. 462–469
- "At the Mill" (Bay der mil), translated by Irena Klepfisz. In: Sandra Bark (Ed.), Beautiful as the Moon, Radiant as the Stars: Jewish Women in Yiddish Stories: an Anthology. New York: Warner Books, 2003. ISBN 978-0-446-69136-9. p. 75–81
- "A Cut" (A shnit). Translated by Jordan Finkin and Allison Schaechter. Your Impossible Voice (19), 2019.
- "The First Patient" (Der ershter patsyent). Translated by Jordan Finkin and Allison Schachter. Pakn Treger, Summer 2020
- "Sonnet"; "A Winter Echo"; "Dusks." Translated by Kathryn Hellerstein. In Jewish American Literature: A Norton Anthology, edited by Jules Chametzky, John Felstiner, Jilene Flanzbaum, and Kathryn Hellerstein. W. W. Norton, 2001. ISBN 978-0-393-04809-4.
- "The Shorn Head" (Obgeshnitene hor), translated by Irena Klepfisz. In: Melanie Kaye/Kantrowitz and Klepfisz (Eds.), The Tribe of Dina: A Jewish Women's Anthology. Boston: Beacon Press, 1989. p. 190–193
- "The Veil" (Der Shleyer), translated by Brina Menachovsky Rose. In: Frieda Forman et al. (Eds.), Found Treasures: Stories by Yiddish Women Writers. Toronto: Second Story Press, 1994. ISBN 978-0-929005-53-9. p. 99–104
- "Winter Berries" (Kalines), translated by Irena Klepfisz. In: Sandra Bark (Ed.), Beautiful as the Moon, Radiant as the Stars: Jewish Women in Yiddish Stories: an Anthology. New York: Warner Books, 2003. ISBN 978-0-446-69136-9. p. 21–27
