= Joel Slonim =

American poet

Joel Slonim (October 12, 1884 – October 26, 1944) was a Belarusian-born Jewish-American Yiddish journalist and poet.

== Life ==
Slonim was born on October 12, 1884, in Drahichyn, Russia, the son of Isaac Slonim and Esther Halpern. His last name was originally Slonimski, and he was related to Hayyim Selig Slonimski.

Slonim immigrated to America when he was two, initially living in Chicago before moving to New York City. His literary career began when he was fifteen, when he wrote poems in both English and Yiddish. While leading English critics praised his work, he later chose Yiddish as his medium. The first Yiddish writer to spend virtually his whole life in America, his background implemented his role as a founder of a school of modern Yiddish poetry in the Western world.

Slonim's poems debuted in Philadelphia's Di Idishe Velt, after which he published poetry in a variety of periodicals, mainly based in New York. He helped established the Zionist quarterly Di Naye Shtime in 1903, although it only lasted until 1905. He cofounded Literatur in 1908. He co-edited the anthology Troymen un Virklekhkeyt, Literarishes Zamelbukh with Jacob Adler in 1909, contributing an article on Edgar Allan Poe and other items to the anthology. He also co-edited the anthology Literatur, Zamlbukh with Joel Entin and M. Y. Khayimovitsh in 1910, contributing an essay on Oscar Wilde and other items to the anthology. His poems appeared in Morris Bassin's 1917 anthology Finf Hundert Yor Yidishe Poezye and Nachman Meisel's 1955 collection Amerike in Yidishn Vort.

Slonim became associated with Di Yunge in 1908 and was an editor of Literatur. In 1906, he became a staff member of the newspaper Die Warheit. When the paper was absorbed by Der Tog, he joined that paper.

He wrote widely on English and American literature. He also reported on crime, and knew his way around the city's underworld and City Hall better than any other Yiddish reporter. He covered police headquarters, the courts, City Hall, and was on a first name basis with the judges and racket bosses. He worked with Tammany Hall to make sure Der Tog's endorsement of Democratic candidates was rewarded with a generous number of paid municipal notices. Chief political reporter of the paper for 25 years, he covered Albany for the paper during the gubernatorial administrations of Smith, Roosevelt, and Lehman and established a friendly relationship with all three of them, Wendell Willkie, and Louis Brandeis. During Jimmy Walker's second mayoral term, he was secretary of the Department of Docks. Slonim was political editor of Der Tog from 1929 until his death, managing, literary, and dramatic editor of Warheit from 1921 to 1929, editor of Literatur und Leben from 1921 to 1924, and editor of Yugund in 1925. He was a director of the Harlem Hebrew Day and Night Nursery from 1921 until his death and the Hebrew National Orphan Home from 1929 until his death. He was an executive committee member of the American Jewish Congress. He was also cofounder and presidium member of IKUF, cofounder of the leftist Writers’ and Artists’ Committee, director of ICOR, and central committee member of Poale Zion. He was an executive committee member of the Non-Sectarian Anti-Nazi League, a member and director of the Jewish League for American Defense, and a member of the Jewish National Workers Alliance.

In 1910, Slonim married Sonia Peck. Their children were Jay and Irving. Jay was Assistant United States Attorney for the Southern District of New York, and Irving was deputy assistant New York County District Attorney. Both sons served in the military during World War II, with Jay serving as a lieutenant in the Coast Guard and Irving as a captain in the Army.

Slonim died in Fifth Avenue Hospital on October 26, 1944.
