= Brusyliv, Zhytomyr Oblast =

Rural locality in Zhytomyr Oblast, Ukraine

Brusyliv Брусилів
- Rural settlement
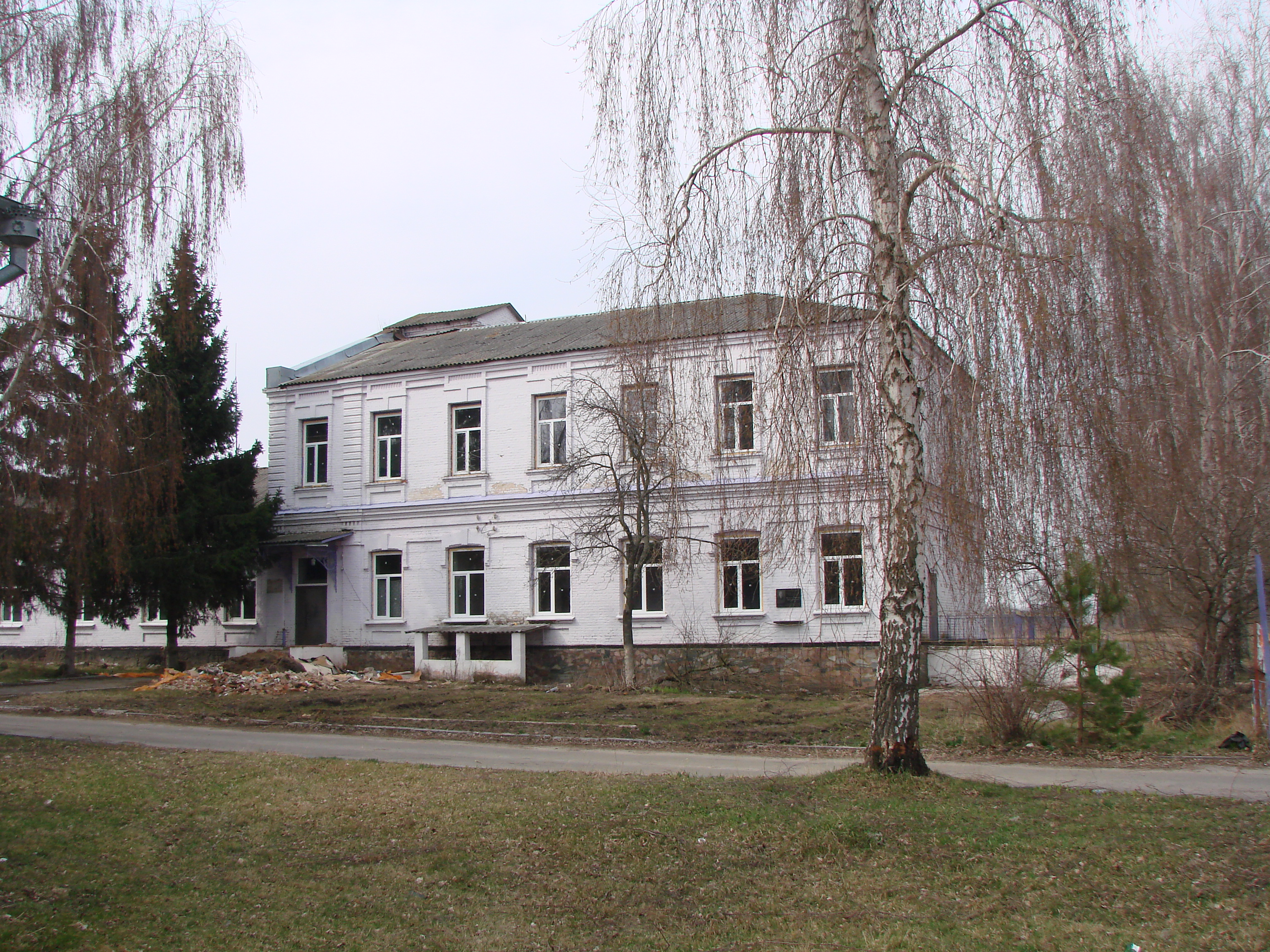
- Buildings of the old zemstvo hospital

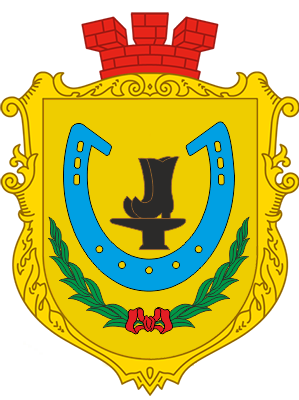
- Coat of arms

- Location in Ukraine Brusyliv (Ukraine)
- Coordinates: 50°17′08″N 29°31′21″E
- Country: Ukraine
- Oblast: Zhytomyr Oblast
- Raion: Zhytomyr Raion
- Hromada: Brusyliv settlement hromada

Area
  - Total: 16.5 km^{2} (6.4 sq mi)

Population (2022)
  - Total: 4,627
- Time zone: UTC+2 (EET)
  - Summer (DST): UTC+3 (EEST)

Brusyliv (Ukrainian: Брусилів; Russian: Брусилов, Brusilov) is a rural settlement in Zhytomyr Raion, in the eastern part of Zhytomyr Oblast in northern Ukraine. Brusyliv is the center of the Brusyliv settlement hromada, being situated on the river Zdvyzh. It had the status of an urban-type settlement since 1979 until 2024, when the status was abolished. Population: 4,627 (2022 estimate).

== History ==
Until 26 January 2024, Brusyliv was designated urban-type settlement. On this day, a new law entered into force which abolished this status, and Brusyliv became a rural settlement.

== Geography ==
Brusyliv is situated 29 km from the railway station Skochyshche, 56 km from Zhytomyr by railway and by 78 km by highway. First historical mention dates to 1543. Postal code for Brusyliv is 12605 and telephone code is +380-4162 (with international prefix +380). Mayor of the town in 2006 was Leonid Rybets.

== Notable people ==
- Ivan Ohienko (1882–1972) – Ukrainian linguist, historian and religious figure.
- David Ignatoff (1885–1954) – Yiddish writer and dramatist active in the USA.
- Stanislav Boklan (1960) – Ukrainian actor.
