= David Ignatoff =

American writer

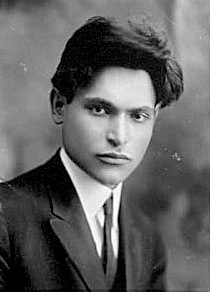
- Born: David Ignatovski; 15 October 1885; Brusilov, Russian Empire
- Died: 26 February 1954 (aged 68); New York City, United States of America
- Resting place: Mount Carmel Cemetery
- Spouse: Malka "Minnie" Ignatoff (1889–1971)
- Children: Daniel Ignatoff; Judith (Ignatoff) Danoff
- Writing career
- Language: Yiddish
- Movement: Di Yunge

David Ignatoff (Yiddish: דוד איגנאַטאָוו; 15 October 1885 – 26 February 1954), born David Ignatovski (Yiddish: דוד איגנאַטאָווסקי), was a Russian-born American Yiddish author and playwright. A member of the Di Yunge literary movement, Ignatoff wrote short stories, novels, plays, and children's stories.

== Biography ==
David Ignatoff was born to a poor Hasidic family in Brusilov, where he received a traditional religious education. He went to Kiev in 1903, where he became active in the Iskra faction of the Russian Social Democratic Workers Party and was arrested for revolutionary activities. He emigrated to New York City in 1906, finding work as a factory worker and union leader.

Ignatoff published his first story, "Ervachung," in Der yugend in 1907, and his novel Tsvey kreftn was published in 1908. He helped found the literary group Di Yunge and, together with I. J. Schwartz, edited and published the literary annual Literatur in 1910. Ignatoff founded the avant-garde literary quarterly Shriftn in 1912, which he edited until 1926. He also edited the annual Velt-ayn, Velt-oys (1916).

Ignatoff's "Der giber" ('The Hero'), a biblical story based on the legend of Yiftaḥ, was published in the first Shriftn. In 1918 he released Dos Farborgene Likht ('The Hidden Light', 1918), a collection of tales based on the stories of Rabbi Nachman of Breslov. His major works include In keslgrub ('In the Crucible', 1918); Vundermayses fun Altn Prag ('Wondertales of Old Prague', 1920); the trilogy Af vayte vegn ('On Distant Roads', 1932); Dos vos kumt for (1932); and Far a nayer velt (1939). He later composed the biblical plays Yiftokh ('Jephthah', 1939) and Gideon (1953).

In the last forty years of his life Ignatoff was a member of the staff of the Hebrew Immigrant Aid Society. He died in New York on 26 June 1954. Arrangements for the funeral were made by the World Congress for Jewish Culture, Jewish PEN Club, Jewish Writers Union and other cultural organizations.
