= Alter Esselin =

American writer

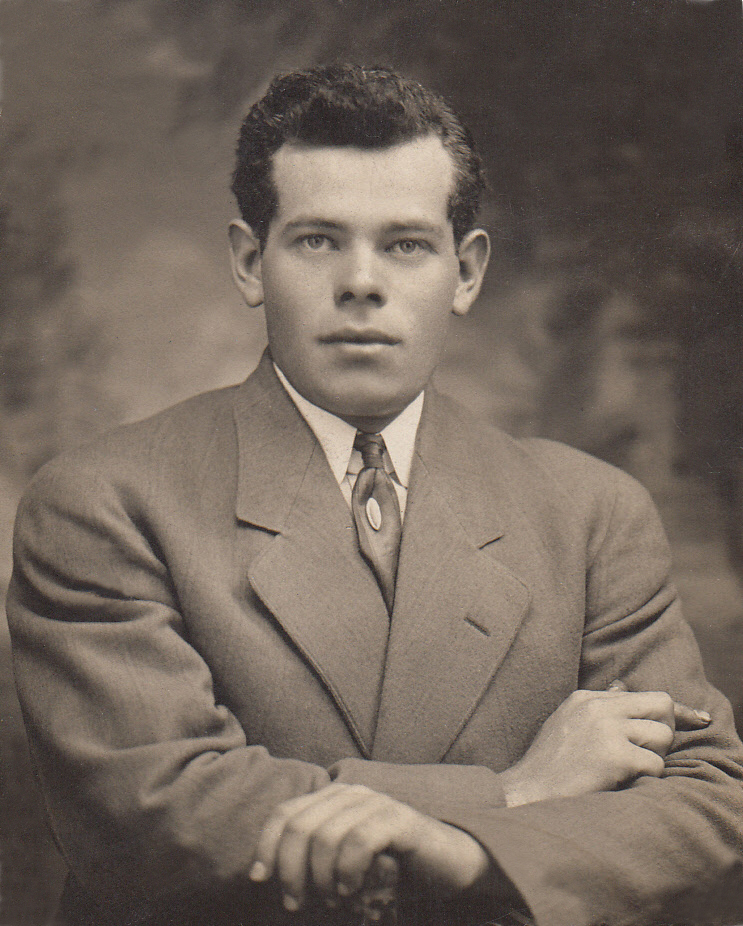
- Alter Esselin
- Born: Orkeh Serebrenik; April 23, 1889; Chernihiv, Chernigov Governorate, Russian Empire
- Died: November 22, 1974 (aged 85); Milwaukee, Wisconsin
- Citizenship: American
- Occupations: Poet, Carpenter
- Spouse: Becky (nee Friedland)
- Children: Joseph, Jacob
- Writing career
- Language: Yiddish, English
- Notable awards: The Harry Kovner Award for the best collection of Yiddish poetry of the year 1954

1969 recording of Alter Esselin reading his poem in Yiddish, "Elegy for a Tree".

1969 recording of Alter Esselin reading his poem in English, "Elegy for a Tree".

1969 recording of Alter Esselin reading his poem "Consolation Comes Late"

1969 recording of Alter Esselin recalling his life as a poet.

Alter Esselin (Yiddish: אלטער עסעלין, born Orkeh Serebrenik) was a Jewish-American poet who wrote in the Yiddish language. He was born in Chernihiv, in the Chernigov Governorate of the Russian Empire (present-day Ukraine) on April 23, 1889, and died in Milwaukee, Wisconsin, on November 22, 1974. In fifty years of his life, he wrote and had published several hundred poems in such publications as Di goldene keyt, Di veg, Kundus, The Zukunft or Di Tsukunft (The Future) and many others.

His work is discussed in Sol Liptzin's A History of Yiddish Literature and is included in Nachman Mayzel's America in Yiddishen Vort.

Three books of his poetry were published. The first was Knoytn (Candlewicks) in 1927; The second, Unter der last (Under the Yoke), in 1936, and the third, Lider fun a midbarnik (Songs of a Hermit) in 1954 for which The Jewish Book Council gave him The Harry Kovner Award as the best collection of Yiddish poetry of the year, in 1955.

Esselin's long poem "Proletarier" was published in the July 12, 1924, issue of the left wing newspaper Morgen Freiheit and in the January 19, 1925, issue the editor, Moissaye Joseph Olgin, announced that Esselin's poem had been awarded the first place prize in the Freiheit's international competition.

Esselin received other recognition. In 1954 the distinguished Yiddish critic, O. Rapaport, wrote an article about Esselin in the journal Di Tsukunft, entitled "dos vort is lebedik (the Word is Alive)" in which he praised Esselin's unique poetic voice, a bittersweet voice that Rapaport says emerged from his effort to overcome suffering.

In October, 1969, Esselin appeared on "The People of the Book," a weekly television program devoted to Jewish culture on WTMJ, Milwaukee. Please see the sidebar for audio excerpts from the program, with Esselin reading both Yiddish and English versions of his poem "Elegy for a Tree". Also included is a reading of his poem, "Consolation Comes Late" and an audio excerpt of Esselin recalling his life as a poet.

== Biography ==
Esselin's formal education came to an end with the death of his father when he was ten, an event that had a lifelong effect. His mother, left with four small children to rear, reluctantly sent Orkeh, the eldest, out to work—to serve a five-year apprenticeship to a carpenter, an occupation that he followed the rest of his life.

Due to his lack of schooling, he became a passionate autodidact—a passion that was enhanced by his dedication to the writing of poetry.

Esselin came to the US as a boy of fifteen in 1904, but the uncle who was expected to be his sponsor (his mother's brother) had died while Esselin was in transit, and the other relatives were unsympathetic. He joined the Carpenter's Union under the name Artur (in honor of Artur Rubenstein, the pianist) and the surname Solomon (the wisest man). Later, when he began writing poetry, he adopted the name Alter Esselin. (Alter—the old one) in following the custom among Ashkenazi Jews of renaming the eldest surviving son in event of a father's early demise as a way of asking the Angel of Death not to bother the family again; and Esselin, using the consonants in Solomon.

Following the break up of a youthful marriage, Esselin became a journeyman carpenter, working for a time in one city after another until he saved enough to last a few weeks and then to hole up in a rented room to devour books from the library. Over the next few years he immersed himself in the then lively world of Yiddish poetry in America. He became fascinated by the poetry of Moyshe-Leyb Halpern, whose melancholy, tragic voice spoke powerfully to him, and later on Halpern became his mentor.

Esselin began to compose poetry of his own, but oddly enough, his first publication was in Polish. He had settled for a while in Canton, Ohio, and was befriended by a young Jewish woman, an immigrant from Poland. When he showed her a poem he had written, Di fodim fun gloibn (The Thread of Belief) she was so taken with it that she insisted on translating it into Polish and got it published in a local paper that covered the Polish-Jewish community.

He was so encouraged by this that he sent several poems to the Detroit Yiddish newspaper, Der veg (The Jewish way). When the second poem appeared in the paper, it was accompanied by a boxed notice from the editor that said that he regarded Esselin's poetry as the emergence of a new literary star, and that he hoped the star would shine for a long time.

Esselin moved to Chicago and lived there for a few years becoming an active member of Chicago's Yiddish literary world and there met his second wife, Becky. After a year or two they moved to Los Angeles and lived there till 1925.

In 1926, Esselin and his family moved to Milwaukee, Wisconsin, where he spent the rest of his life, working as a carpenter in the daytime and composing his verse at night...although if an idea came to him on the job he would scribble it down during the lunch break.

Esselin's poetry often dealt with themes that are thought to be morbid and pessimistic... loneliness, the bite of conscience, the scourge of poverty...themes that came directly from his life experiences. When his son, Joseph, once asked him why he chose such dark subjects, his answer was that when he began to write poetry he asked myself what he should write about, and the answer was simple: to write about themes that troubled him the most—in order to defy them, and thus to overcome them.

In his second book, Unter der last, Esselin has one of his most moving poems, malach guter (Gracious Angel), dedicated to his mentor Moyshe-Leyb Halpern, in which he declares that the spirit of a great poet is not stilled, because there is a bridge—his poetry—over which the gracious angel is able to bring the poet's spirit back to life.

On April 22, 1969, The Forward (Forverts) published an article by Yitzok Perlov "In Celebration of the Eightieth Birthday of Alter Esselin" which detailed the events of his career and evoked the eloquent bittersweet tone of his poetry.

Earlier in 1969, Jacob Glatstein in Der Tag Yiddish Journal, praised the publication of the translations into English—the collaboration of Esselin with his son, Joseph—in book form, as a worthy tribute to Esselin's accomplishments.

All through Esselin's lifetime his work has been favorably reviewed by major Yiddish critics, but he is remembered after his death as well. Thirty years after his death, Mikhail Krutikov wrote a retrospective article in The Forward (Forverts) going over Esselin's life and celebrating his unique poetic voice.

Esselin's Yiddish poetry has been translated into English both by his son, Joseph, and other translators.

The Alter Esselin Archive is in the Judaica Section of Harvard University's Widener Library.
