= Congress for Jewish Culture =

Yiddish cultural organization based in New York City, New York, U.S.

The Congress for Jewish Culture (also known as the World Congress for Jewish Culture or, in Yiddish, der Alveltlekher Yidisher Kultur-kongres) is a secular organization founded in 1948 to promote Yiddish culture throughout the world.

== History and operations ==
Individuals active in the founding of the organization included Yiddish writers and intellectuals, including Shmuel Niger, Chaim Grade, Avrom Reyzen, Shmerke Kaczerginski, and Pinkhos Schwartz. At its founding, the society had offices in New York City, Buenos Aires and Paris. Today, only the New York City office remains active.

Since 1953, the organization has published Die Zukunft (The Future, founded in 1892), the world's oldest Yiddish journal still in publication. It has also been an important publisher of Yiddish reference works and monographs, including the eight-volume Biographical Dictionary of Modern Yiddish Literature (co-edited by Shmuel Niger and Jacob Shatzky) and a supplemental work, the Biographical Dictionary of Yiddish Writers in the Soviet Union.

The organization also conducts yearly memorials in New York City in memory of the Warsaw Ghetto Uprising of April 19, 1943, and in memory of the Soviet Yiddish writers murdered on August 12, 1952 (also known as the Night of the Murdered Poets).

The Congress for Jewish Culture's website, congressforjewishculture.org, highlights it events, artwork, publications, and has a large and growing lexicon (in English and Yiddish) of Yiddish writers.

== See also ==
- List of Jewish organizations
