= Boris Sandler =

Yiddish-language writer and journalist

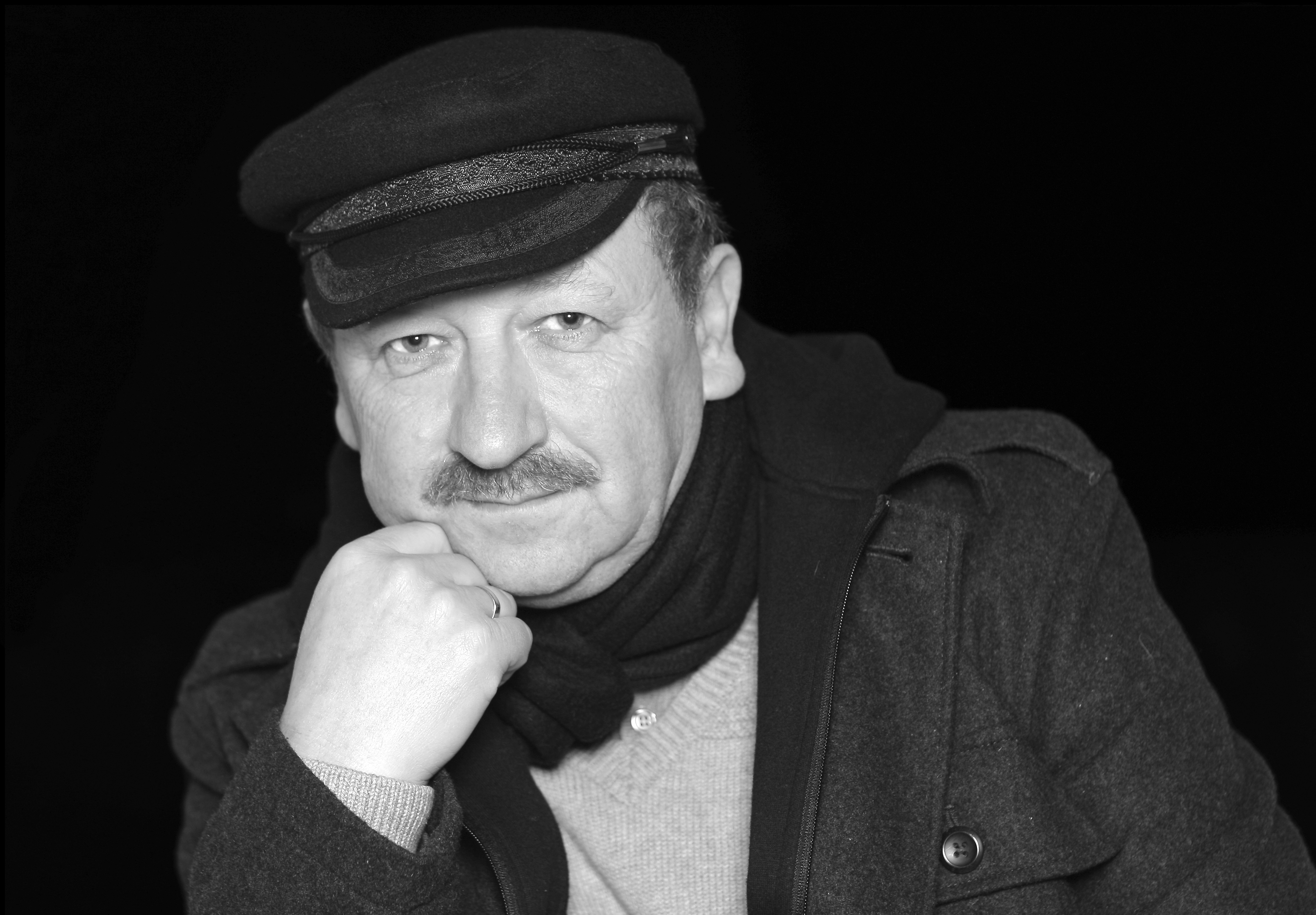
Sandler in 2009

Boris Sandler (Yiddish: באָריס סאַנדלער; born January 6, 1950) is a Yiddish-language author, journalist, playwright and lyricist and the former editor of the Yiddish edition of the Forward.

== Early life; career beginnings ==
Boris Sandler was born in 1950 in Bălți, Bessarabia (Yiddish: Beltz, today: Moldova), where he was raised among Holocaust survivors and their children in a Yiddish-speaking milieu which would inspire many characters and scenes in his later literary works. From his parents and neighbors, mostly former residents of small towns and villages who had moved to larger cities after the Holocaust, he learned the native folk traditions of Jewish Bessarabia along with its rich Yiddish dialect.

Sandler began studying music at the age of five, eventually enrolling in a music conservatory. He worked as a professional violinist for a decade, including seven years playing with the Moldovan State Orchestra. He took a two-year hiatus from his musical career, however, to study literature as part of a group of Yiddish and other minority-language writers who attended the Gorky Literature Institute in Moscow for graduate studies. There in 1981 Sandler was among the first cohort of Yiddish writers and poets to study Yiddish literature at the graduate level in the USSR since Stalin's purge of Yiddish writers and educational institutions in the late 1940s. He made his literary debut that same year in the USSR's state-sponsored Yiddish literary journal Sovetish Heymland, where he would later serve on the journal's editorial board. His first collection of short fiction, Stairway to a Miracle, was published in 1986.

== Final years in Moldova; move to Israel ==
In 1989 Sandler became the host and lead producer of the first regularly-appearing Yiddish-language television show On the Jewish Street, which aired for several years on Moldovan television. During this period Sandler created two Yiddish-language documentary films, "Where is My Home" and "Don't Give Up Yiddish!" about Moldovan Jewish life. Sensing that most of the community would soon leave for Israel, he used the documentaries as a way to preserve the memories of Bessarabian Jewry at a time of great upheaval. From 1990 until 1992 Sandler was also the editor of the Yiddish section of the Chișinău-based newspaper Our Voice.

Sandler moved to Israel in 1992, where he soon became active in the local community of Yiddish writers and journalists, contributing articles to the Yiddish press, working in a publishing house and at Hebrew University where he assisted in the cataloging of interwar Yiddish periodicals. In addition to his work as the executive director of Leivick House Publishing, Sandler published a children's magazine Kind un Keyt. During this period three of Sandler's books appeared in Israel; the novella Case Number 5390 (1992) and the short story collections The Old Well (1994) and Gates (1997).

== Emigration to America; editor of the "Yiddish Forward" ==
In 1998 Sandler moved to New York to begin working at the Yiddish edition of The Forward. After the unexpected death of editor-in-chief Mordechai Strigler several months later Sandler took over the newspaper, adding an international lineup of new contributors and training two generations of new Yiddish journalists. Sandler also expanded The Forward's literary offerings, publishing new works by esteemed writers of the older generation including Abraham Karpinowitz, Yekhiel Shraybman, Zvi Eisenmann, Misha Lev, Rivka Basman Ben-Hayim, Tsvi Kanar, Moyshe Shklar, Yente Mash, Chaim Beider and younger writers such as Mikhoel Felsenbaum, Boris Kotlerman, Moishe Lemster, Emil Kalin and Evgeny Kissin. Additionally, Sandler oversaw the production of several thousand hours of The Forward's weekly Yiddish radio show, and produced a dozen CDs of Yiddish music and audio books, which were released under the aegis of The Forward. During this period several of Sandler's novels appeared as serials in the paper.

Besides his work as a writer and editor Sandler also produced a series of twelve documentary films about the lives of Yiddish writers. Most of these films, released between 2009 and 2016, were based on interviews conducted in the late 1990s, when the last generation of Yiddish writers who came of age before World War II were still active in Israel. Additionally he oversaw the launch of the newspaper's YouTube channel.

== Retirement from "Yiddish Forward"; "Yidish Branzhe" ==
Sandler retired from the "Yiddish Forward" in 2016 after 18 years as editor-in-chief. He continues to publish his own fiction as well as the works of others in the online publication "Yidish Branzhe", which he founded and edits.

== Literary style/influences/themes ==
While most of Sandler's fiction takes place in the post-war Bessarabia of his youth his subject matter ranges from historical novels about the Kishenev Pogrom and novellas about the Holocaust to portrayals of immigrant Jewish life in Israel and New York and even occasional science fiction. In addition to strong influences from classic Yiddish writers such as Sholem Aleichem and modernist Yiddish writers such as David Bergelson Sandler's fiction often incorporates elements of Magic realism. Among Sandler's frequent themes are intergenerational trauma resulting from the Holocaust, the effect of totalitarian political regimes on the lives of artists and writers, the fate of Yiddish language and culture in the 21st century and the impact of immigration on multigenerational families.

Sandler has also written a series of Yiddish children's stories based on Jewish folktales as well as the collection of rhyming couplets ניט געשטויגן, ניט געפֿלויגן (roughly: "It Didn't Happen that Way.")

== Awards ==
Boris Sandler has received nearly every Yiddish literary prize that was still being awarded in the 1990s and 2000s including the Jacob Fichman Prize (2002), the Dovid Hofshtein Prize awarded by the Yiddish Writer's Union in Israel (2005) and the J. I. Segal Prize from the Jewish Public Library of Montreal for the best new work of Yiddish literature (2010, 2014 and 2020).

Additionally Sandler's short film on the history of the Forward building received an Ippies award from the Center for Community and Ethnic Media at CUNY.

In 2024 he was awarded the Rubinlicht Prize.

== Bibliography ==
Stairway to a Miracle (Yiddish: Moscow, Sovietsky Pisatel Publishers, 1986)

Stairway to a Miracle (Russian translation: Moscow, Sovietsky Pisatel Publishers, 1988)

Case Number 5390 (Yiddish: Jerusalem, Y. L. Peretz Publishing, 1992)

The Old Well (Yiddish: Jerusalem, Y. L. Peretz Publishing, 1994)

Gates (Yiddish: Tel Aviv, H. Leivick Publishing, 1997)

Глина и плоть (Russian Translation of When the Golem Closed His Eyes: Kishinev, Pontos Publishing, 2003)

Die grunen Apfel des Paradieses (German Translation: Berlin, Ed. Dodo Publishing, 2003)

When the Golem Closed His Eyes (Yiddish: Tel Aviv, H. Leivick Publishing, 2004)

Nisht geshtoygn, nisht gefloygn (Yiddish Rhyming Couplets for Children, New York, Ed. Kind-un-Keyt, 2007)

Red Shoes for Rachel (Yiddish: New York, Forverts Publishing, 2008)

In Klangennets fun Netsekh (Yiddish Poems, New York, Forverts Publishing, 2010)

Hidden Saints I Recall (Yiddish: New York, Forverts Publishing, 2010)

Stones Don’t Bear Witness (English Translation of When the Golem Closed His Eyes: Jersey City, KTAV Publishing, 2011)

Green Apples of Paradise (Russian translation: New York, Forverts Publishing, 2011)

Keinemsdorf (Yiddish: New York, Forverts Publishing, 2012).

Apocrypha (Yiddish Poems, New York City, Forverts Publishing, 2014)

Express-36 (Russian Translation of Hidden Saints I Recall, Moscow, Ed. Knizhniki, 2017)

Red Shoes for Rachel (English: Syracruse University Press, 2017)

Helfand Eli un Kleptshk-Bebtshik (Yiddish and Russian Translation: Birobidzhan, 2018)

Helfand Eli un Kleptshk-Bebtshik (Yiddish and English Translation: New York City, Yiddish Branzhe Publishing, 2018)

Tall Tales About Animals With Tails (English and Russian Translation: New York City, Yiddish Branzhe Publishing, 2019)

Antiques From My Travel Bag - vol. 1 (Yiddish: New York City, Yiddish Branzhe Publishing, 2019)

Detective Rabbi Meir Okun and Others - vol. 2 (Yiddish: New York City, Yiddish Branzhe Publishing, 2019)

Memorial Day In The Town Of Amnezia (Russian Translation of Antiques From My Travel Bag, New York City, Yiddish Branzhe Publishing, 2020)

With a Mission to Moscow (Yiddish: New York City, Yiddish Branzhe Publishing, 2022)

Kuriositäten aus der Reisetasche (German Translation of Antiques From My Travel Bag: Salzburg, Verlag Anton Pustet, 2022)

In a Splinter of a Mirror, poems from different years (Russian translation: New York City, Yiddish Branzhe Publishing, 2024)
