= Olexander Beyderman =

Ukrainian writer

Olexander Abramovytsch Beyderman (Ukrainian Олександр Абрамович Бейдерман, Scientific transliteration Oleksandr Abramovyč Bejderman; also: Bejderman; * 1949 in Odessa) is a Soviet-Ukrainian writer of Jewish descent. He is a lecturer of Hebrew, Russian and English philology at the University of Odessa.

Beyderman writes in Yiddish, Ukrainian and Russian and is considered to be one of the last and more important Yiddish authors in the former areas of Russian Jews. His entree to Soviet literature took place with the assistance of literature functionaries of the time, though he was never an orthodox follower of the dogmas of socialist realism and soon found his own style combining realistic language with harsh expressiveness that outreaches the simplicity of his themes. He treats the extermination of Jews in World War II as well as topics reminiscent of Sholem Aleichem and other earlier Jewish writers. His depictions range from subtle criticism of society to quasi-blasphemous sarcasm. His texts are read in Israel and the United States as well as in Ukraine. The editions of his novels and plays are more numerous in Russian and Ukrainian. During the last couple of years, Ukrainian has come to play a greater role in his writings.

Beyderman was a Fellow in the Moses Mendelssohn Centre and works for the Claims Conference.
