= California Institute for Yiddish Culture and Language =

Cultural center near Los Angeles

The California Institute for Yiddish Culture and Language (CYCL) started in 1999 and serves as a multi-generational center for the teaching, promotion, celebration and learning of Yiddish in all of its embodiments, with an emphasis on the arts and other areas that influence the cultural formations that inform its existence. The institute owes its establishment to Miriam Koral, who is the Founding Director, and who, as a Yiddish instructor at UCLA and native Yiddish speaker, created the center and community that brings world-renowned Yiddish authors, playwrights, musicians, poets, artists and others to the Los Angeles area.

== See also ==
- Yiddishkeit
