= Miriam Hoffman =

Polish-American Yiddish-language playwright and lecturer

Miriam (Schmulewitz) Hoffman (born 1936) was a Yiddish language playwright and lecturer.

Hoffman was born in Łódź, Poland to a Yiddish-speaking family. While she was a child, her father was sent to a forced labor camp in Siberia, accompanied by Hoffman and her mother. After a difficult passage through several other countries, the family arrived in the United States in 1949. In 1957 Hoffman finished the Jewish Teacher's Seminary with a B.A. in pedagogy. In the 1970s she taught Yiddish at the University of Tel-Aviv, Israel. She received a B.A. from the University of Miami, cum laude, in 1981, and an M.A. from Columbia University, in 1983. From 1991 to 1994 she taught Yiddish and Yiddish Dramatic Arts in the Oxford University Summer Program. From 1992 until her retirement in 2017, she was a professor of Yiddish language and culture at Columbia University.

Since the late 1990s Hoffman was a columnist and feature writer for the Jewish Forward, where she published over two thousand articles. She also edited a monthly literary supplement for the Forward. In 1992 she won the Israeli equivalent of a Tony Award for her English-to-Yiddish translation of Neil Simon's The Sunshine Boys.

== Playwright ==
She was a playwright, with ten Yiddish plays to her name, produced and performed both at the N. Y. Shakespeare Festival and the Joseph Papp Theater, off-Broadway at the Astor Theater, the John Houseman Theater, the 92nd St. Y, with productions in major American and European cities, among them: Amsterdam, Zurich, Munich, Dresden, Regensburg and Warsaw, Poland. Original plays staged at The Folksbiene Yiddish Theater in New York, the Jewish Repertory Theater-Playhouse 91, Center for Jewish History, the Sadye Bronfman Theater in Montreal, Canada, Akzent Theater in Vienna, Austria and the Yiddishpiel Theater in Tel-Aviv, Israel. 1992 Israeli equivalent of the Tony Award for translation into Yiddish of Neil Simon's The Sunshine Boys.

== Author ==
The Congress for Jewish Culture published a series of Hoffman's Yiddish children's books. Fellowship award from the Holocaust memorial Foundation, literary awards from the National Foundation for Jewish culture and the New School for Social Research. Published in "Di Goldene Keyt," literary magazine in Israel - a scholarly work on - "Łódź - Yiddish dialect." Winner of the Dora Teitelbaum Foundation for a literary work, published "Memory and Memorial," in the Yivo Bleter Publication. Entry on the History of the Yiddish Theater in the Encyclopedia Americana (pp. 678–679), published the History of the Joseph Papp Yiddish Theater in the "Oxforder Yiddish," volume two, "Women in the novels of A. M. Fuks," "Oxforder Yiddish," volume three.

== Lecturer ==
Hoffman lectured all over the world, topics include: "Yiddish language and Folklore, Yiddish Theater and Film", "The unpublished diary of a Jewish Soldier in the First World War," "Hebrew vs Yiddish," Chaim Grade's "Deciphering a Seminal Masterpiece," "Life in a D.P. Camp in Germany (displaced persons - saving remnants of the Holocaust)" (1946–1949), also a collection of Songs in four languages, (Yiddish, Hebrew, Russian and Polish) which was written down in the D.P. Camp in Ulm, Germany by the then ten-year-old Miriam, and brought to America in 1950, now at the Holocaust Museum in Washington. She was fluent in Yiddish and Hebrew, and had a speaking knowledge of Russian, Polish and some German.
