= Yoel Matveyev =

Soviet poet (born 1976)

Yoel Matveyev (יואל מאַטוועיעוו), born in 1976, is a Yiddish, English and Russian poet, writer and journalist from Leningrad, USSR with background in computer programming. He taught himself Yiddish at high school age and started writing Yiddish poetry as a teenager.

Matveyev's poems, prose and verse translations of Russian, English, Irish, Evenki and Esperanto poetry into Yiddish were published in the literary magazines Der Nayer Fraynd, Der Bavebter Yid, Yugntruf, Di Tsukunft, Yiddishland, the newspaper Birobidzhaner Shtern, read on the Israeli international radio Kol Israel, published in several books, including Step By Step, a 2009 anthology of contemporary Yiddish poetry with parallel English translation and A Ring, a 2017 anthology of contemporary Yiddish poetry.

In 2002, he started working as a staff writer for the Yiddish Forward. In 2004–2005, Matveyev helped to establish and coedited the magazine Der Nayer Fraynd, the only Yiddish literary magazine that existed at that time in Russia founded by Yisroel Nekrasov, a Yiddish poet who lives in Saint Petersburg. Matveyev's articles also appeared in English, Russian and Croatian publications. In 2017, Matveyev returned to his home city, Saint Petersburg, where he is currently based. His publications in Russia include Russian prose and poetry, as well as English poems.

== Bibliography ==
- Step by Step, Contemporary Yiddish Poetry, 2009, edited by Elissa Bemporad & Margherita Pascucci, ISBN 9788874622573
- A Ring, Contemporary Yiddish Poetry, 2017, edited by Velvl Chernin & Michael Felzenbaum, ISBN 9789659260539
- Almanac Birobidzhan (v. 16, 2021), edited by Yelena Sarashevskaya, ISBN 9785604463437
