= Anna Margolin =

American writer (1887–1952)

- Born: Rosa Harning Lebensboym; 1887; Brest, Russian Empire (now Brest, Belarus)
- Died: 1952 (aged 64–65); New York City, U.S.
- Occupation: Poet
- Writing career
- Language: Yiddish
- Literary movement: Di Yunge

Rosa Harning Lebensboym (1887–1952), known by her pen name Anna Margolin (Yiddish: אַננאַ מאַרגאָלין), was an American Yiddish language writer of Jewish descent. She wrote journalism, criticism, and fiction, but is by far the best known for her poetry.

== Biography ==
Born in Brest, then part of the Russian Empire, she was educated up to secondary school level, where she studied Hebrew. She first went to New York in 1906, and permanently settled there in 1913. Most of her poetry was written there. Margolin was associated with both the Di Yunge and ‘introspectivist’ groups in the Yiddish poetry scene at the time, but her poetry is uniquely her own.

In her early years in New York City Margolin joined the editorial staff of the liberal Yiddish daily Der Tog (The Day; founded 1914). Under her real name, she edited a section entitled "In der froyen velt" (In the women's world); and also wrote journalistic articles under various pseudonyms, including "Sofia Brandt," and – more often, in the mid 1920s – "Clara Levin." During the same period, she wrote prose short stories, often pseudoymously, which have received less critical attention than her poetry.

Though her reputation rests mainly on the single volume of poems she published in her lifetime, Lider ('Poems', 1929), a posthumous collection, Drunk from the Bitter Truth, including English translations, has also been published. One reviewer described her work as "sensual, jarring, plainspoken, and hard, the record of a soul in direct contact with the streets of 1920s New York". In 2022, a collection of four or her short stories was translated as During Sleepless Nights and Other Stories by Daniel Kennedy with Farlag Press.

== Bibliography ==
Poetry

- Lider. [Poems] (1929)
- Drunk from the Bitter Truth: The Poems of Anna Margolin. Translated Shirley Kumove. (SUNY, 2005) ISBN 0-7914-6579-9 [ Review]

Prose

- During Sleepless Nights and Other Stories. Translated Daniel Kennedy. (Farlag Press, 2022) ISBN 0-7475-3269-9
