= Jacob Sternberg =

Yiddish poet and playwright (1890–1973)

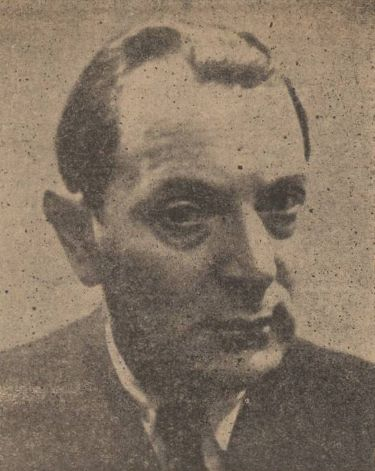
Jacob Sternberg

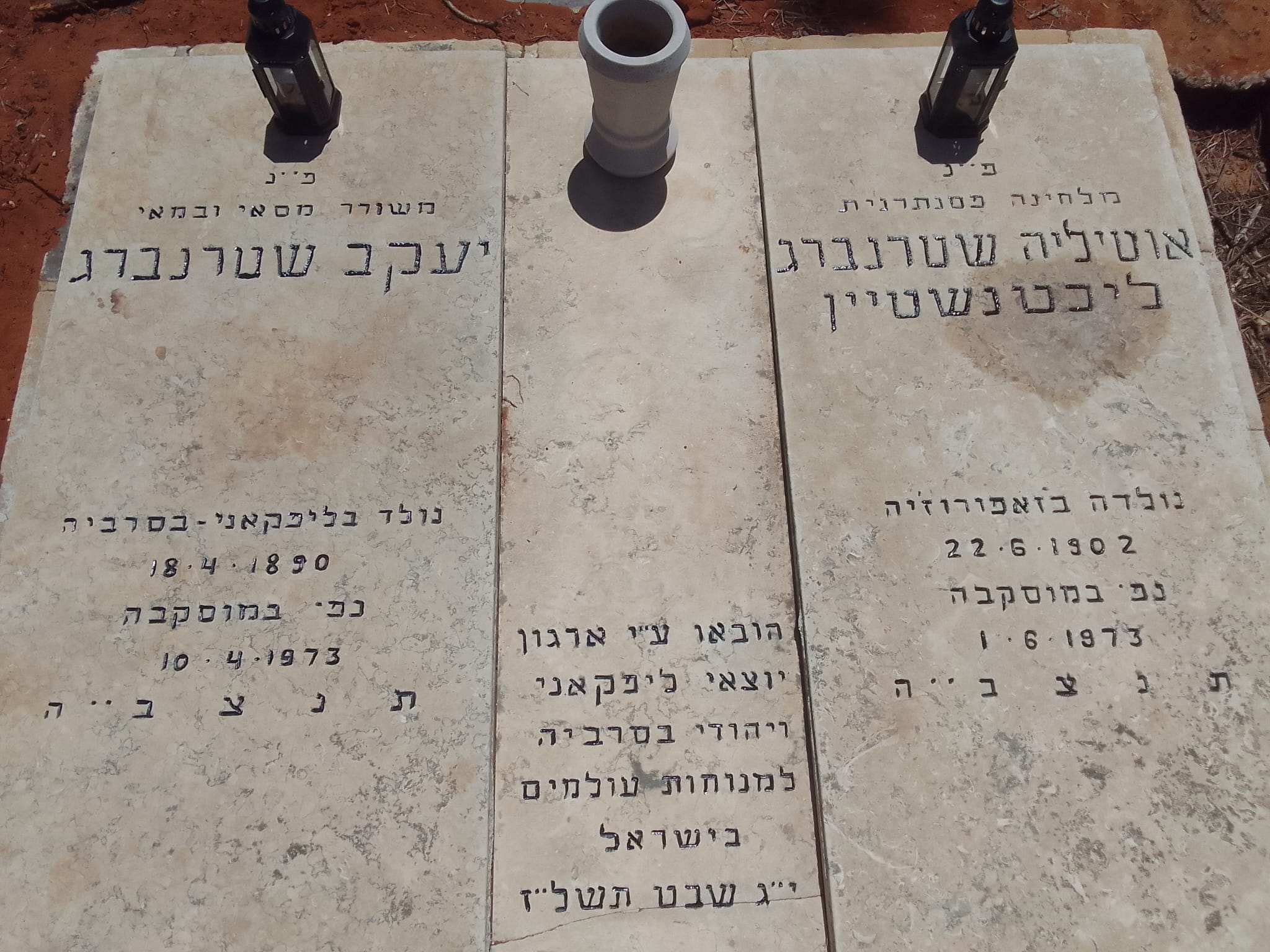
Jacob Sternberg's tombstone

Jacob Sternberg (Yiddish: יעקבֿ שטערנבערג; Russian: Яков Моисеевич Штернберг; 1890, Lipcani, Bessarabia, Russian Empire – 1973, Moscow, USSR) was a Yiddish theater director, teacher of theater, playwright, avant-garde poet and short-story writer, best known for his theater work in Romania between the two world wars.

== Biography ==
Sternberg grew up in the northern Bessarabian shtetl of Lipkany (Yiddish: Lipkon, now Lipcani in Moldova), which was famously termed "Bessarabian Olympus" by Hebrew and Yiddish poet Chaim Nachman Bialik and which in the second half of the 19th century produced several major figures of the modern Yiddish and Hebrew belle-lettres, among them Yehuda Shteinberg and Eliezer Steinbarg. He attended a Russian secondary school in Kamenets-Podolsky, where he was a classmate and close friend of the future Yiddish writer Moyshe Altman.

Sternberg debuted in 1908 with a fairy tale in the newspaper Unzer Lebn (Odessa). He published poetry in Reizen's collections "Fraye Erd" (1910) and "Dos Naye Land" (1911). In the 1910s, he published poetry in the periodicals Hamer (Brăila), Frayhayt, Arbeter Tsaytung, and Dos Naye Lebm (all in Czernowitz), as well as Gut Morgn (Odessa), Literarishe Bleter (Warsaw), and Tsayt (New York).

In 1914 Sternberg settled in first in Czernowitz (then part of Austria-Hungary, now Chernivtsi, Ukraine), and later in Bucharest, Romania. He became associated with the short-lived Yiddish-language magazine Likht ("Light"), four issues of which were published in Iaşi between December 1914 and September 1915. Likht called for a "renaissance of the Jewish stages in Romania" and condemned the "poor foundation" of Yiddish theater as a commercial institution: "The Yiddish stage ought to be a place of education, of drawing Jews closer together through the Yiddish word… we will fight against this [commercial] state of things." Israil Bercovici counts the "literary-musical" gatherings sponsored by that magazine as "the beginning of modern Yiddish theater in Romania", and sees Sternberg as preparing the way for the Vilna Troupe, the Yiddish theater troupe that brought the ideas of Konstantin Stanislavski to Romania. Nonetheless, Sternberg adopted as a slogan "Back to Goldfaden". Calling Abraham Goldfaden "the Prince Charming who woke up the lethargic Romanian Jewish Culture" when he founded professional Yiddish theater in 1876 (Iaşi), Sternberg wrote, "The only milieu that attracts the great Jewish masses is a traditional-cultural theater. Not even a literary theater… From that I created a social-political theater, a theater… [of current events]… which I think was, then, the first of its kind in Yiddish".

In 1917–18, Sternberg and Jacob Botoshansky together founded a Yiddish revue theater in Bucharest, for which they wrote and produced nine short plays (revues), including Tsimes (named after the traditional pureed vegetable dish tsimes), Bukaresht-Yerusholaim ("Bucharest-Jerusalem"), In mitn drinen ("All of a sudden"), Grine bleter ("Green leaves"), Kukuriku, Sholem-Aleykhem ("Hello"), and Hershele Ostropoler ("Hershele of Ostropol"). In 1917, in response to antisemitic violence at that time in Romania and elsewhere in Eastern Europe, he staged passages from Bialik. In 1920, he became the editor of "Der Veker", official organ of the Jewish section of the Romanian Socialist Party. In 1924–26, he was the director for the "Vilner trupe". The Romanian daily newspaper Adevărul wrote on August 23, 1924, shortly after the troupe's arrival in Bucharest, that "Such a demonstration of artistry, even on a small stage such as Jigniţa and even in a language like Yiddish ought to be seen by all who are interested in superior realization of drama."

In 1930 he created a hugely successful studio theater BITS ("Bukareshter Yidishe Teater-Studiye"), housed in Bucharest's Jewish quarter Văcărești, that played a prominent role in the development of modern trends in European theater. BITS staged works of Osip Dymov (Yashke-muzikant – "Yashka the Musician"), Jacob Gordin, I.L. Peretz (Banakht afn altn mark – "A night at the old market"), Sholem Aleichem (Oytser – "Treasure", and most famously Der farkishefter shnayder – "The Enchanted Tailor"), Leib Malach (Der Geler Shotn, 1935), Nikolai Gogol (Zhenit'ba – "The Marriage"), – mostly musical comedies with elements of grotesque, but also I.Y. Singer's Yoshe Kalb and his own play Teater in Flamen ("Theater in Flames") on the theme of the then-ongoing Spanish Civil War. Sidi Tal starred in many of these productions. The performances were popular with the Bucharest intelligentsia and Peretz's "Banakht Afn Altn Mark", for one, was played more than 150 times. During this time, Sternberg published his first collection of poetry, in Bucharest (1938). As antisemitic, pro-fascist tendencies gained power in Bucharest, the theater left for a prolonged tour of major European cities and eventually Sternberg moved to Czernowitz, where he continued his theatrical activities.

In 1939, Sternberg along with Moyshe Altman sneaked across the Dniester and became a Soviet citizen. A year later, when his native Bessarabia was annexed by the Soviet Union, he and most of his former troupe settled in Kishinev, where Sternberg became artistic director of the Yiddish-language Moldovan State Jewish Theater and staged, among other works, M. Daniel's Zyamke Kopatsh and Sholom-Aleichem's Motl Peysi Dem Khazns ("Motl Peysi, the cantor's son") with Sidi Tal in the boys' roles. During the war, he and his theatre evacuated to Uzbekistan, where he worked for the Jewish Anti-Fascist Committee and was mobilized into a paramilitary construction unit. After the war, he returned to Kishinev and resumed his work at the Moldovan State Jewish Theater, where he staged his play Di Balade fun der Esesovke Brunhilde un ir hunt ("The ballad of the SS soldier Brunhilde and her dog") and published poetry in the almanac Heymland (1948). He was arrested at the height of the Stalin's campaign against "rootless cosmopolitans" (Jews) in the spring of 1949 and was sent to labour camps for 7 years. On his early return and rehabilitation 5 years later, Sternberg settled in Moscow and worked as a translator of Romanian literary works into Russian. He began to publish literary essays and poetry in the newly founded Sovetish Heymland in 1961 and briefly became a member of its editorial board. Collections of his poetry were published in Bucharest and Paris, and in Hebrew translation by Shlionsky and Penn in Israel on the occasion of his 75th birthday. Sternberg died of a heart attack in 1973 on the very day he received a permission to leave for Israel. His wife, the composer Otiliya Likhtenshteyn, who set his poems and those of other Soviet Yiddish poets (first of all Leib Kvitko) to music, died the same year. A collection of Sternberg's literary essays on theatrical topics was published posthumously in Israel.

A committed socialist, Sternberg wrote that, in the wake of the October Revolution, "we satirized bourgeois assimilation, struggled with the [Jewish] clergy, fought for progressive Jewish culture, for the emancipation of the Jews, for the rights of citizenship… for progressive Jewish literature."

== Books ==
- Shtot in profil. Lid un grotesk ("City in Profile. Poetry and Grotesque", Bucharest, 1935)
- Izbrannoe ("Collected Poetry", in Russian, Moscow: Sovetskiy Pisatel', 1954)
- Lid un balade af di karpatn ("Songs and Ballads of the Carpathians", Paris: Afsnay, 1968)
- In krayz fun yorn (geklibene lider) ("At the Crossing of Years" (collected poems)", Bucharest: Kriterion, 1970)
- Veygn literatur un teater ("On Literature and Theater" (critical essays), Tel Aviv, 1987)

== Notes and references ==
- Bercovici, Israil, O sută de ani de teatru evriesc în România ("One hundred years of Yiddish/Jewish theater in Romania"), 2nd Romanian-language edition, revised and augmented by Constantin Măciucă. Editura Integral (an imprint of Editurile Universala), Bucharest (1998). ISBN 973-98272-2-5. 116–119 and 148. Also, 125–143 is an extensive discussion of the Vilner Trupe's activities in Bucharest.
