= H. Leivick =

American writer and Yiddish poet (1888–1962)

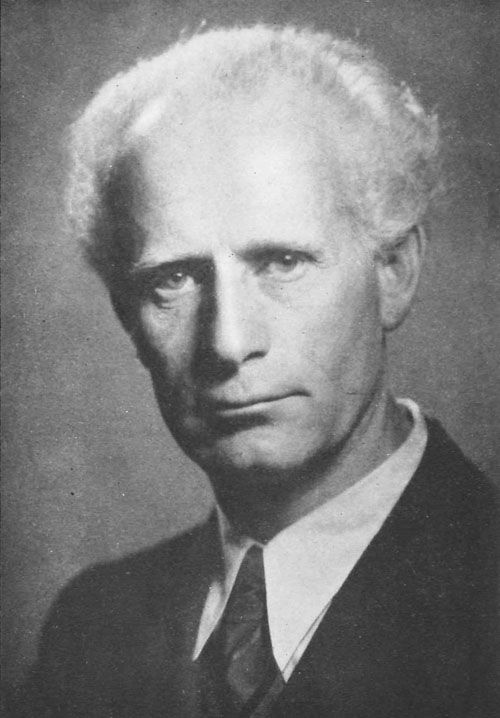
Leivick c. 1940

H. Leivick (Yiddish: ה. לײװיק; pen name of Leivick Halpern, December 25, 1888 – December 23, 1962) was a Yiddish language writer, known for his 1921 "dramatic poem in eight scenes" The Golem. He also wrote many highly political, realistic plays, including Shop. He adopted the pen name of Leivick to avoid being confused with Moyshe-Leyb Halpern, another prominent Yiddish poet.

== Early life and imprisonment ==
Leivick was born in Chervyen, Belarus, the oldest of nine children. His father was a Yiddish instructor for young servants. Leivick was raised in a traditional Jewish household and attended a yeshiva for several years, an experience he thoroughly disliked and depicted in his dramatic poem Chains of the Messiah. Leivick joined the Jewish Bund before or during the 1905 Russian Revolution. The influence of the organization helped to convince Leivick to become secular and to focus his writing on Yiddish rather than Hebrew.

In 1906 Leivick was arrested by Russian authorities for distributing revolutionary literature. He refused any legal assistance during his trial and delivered a speech denouncing the government instead:

I will not defend myself. Everything that I have done I did in full consciousness. I am a member of the Jewish revolutionary party, the Bund, and I will do everything in my power to overthrow the tsarist autocracy, its bloody henchmen, and you as well.

Leivick, then only eighteen, was sentenced to four years of forced labor and permanent exile to Siberia. His prison years were spent in St. Petersburg, Moscow and Minsk, where he wrote Chains of the Messiah. In March 1912 he was marched to Siberia on foot, a journey that lasted more than four months. Leivick was eventually smuggled out of Siberia with the assistance of Jewish revolutionaries in America and sailed to America in the summer of 1913.

== Rise to fame ==
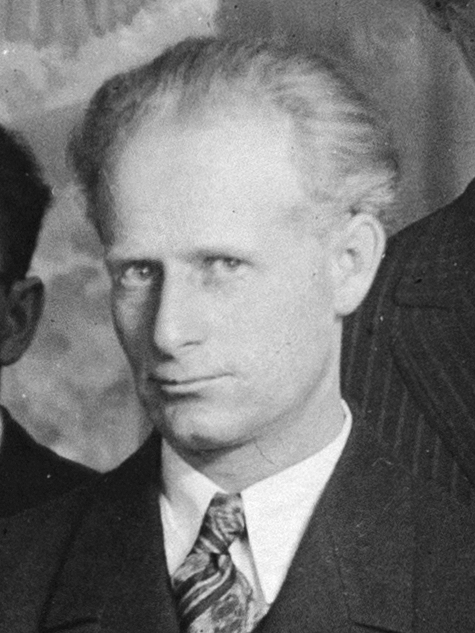
Leivick c. 1922–1923

By the early 1920s, Leivick was writing poetry and drama for several Yiddish dailies, including the Communist Morgen Freiheit. From 1936 to his death, he wrote regularly for Der Tog. He was also active as an editor, working with fellow writer Joseph Opatoshu on an exhaustive series of Yiddish anthologies. Leivick was involved with Di Yunge, a group of avant-garde American-Yiddish poets who praised Yiddish for its artistic and aesthetic possibilities, not merely a conduit for disseminating radical politics to the immigrant masses. Di Yunge included such notable personalities as Moyshe-Leyb Halpern and Mani Leib. Leivick spent most of his life employed as a wallpaper-hanger while simultaneously pursuing his writing.

Leivick's style was neo-Romantic and marked by a deep apocalyptic pessimism combined with an almost naive interest and yearning for the mystical and messianic, themes that continually appeared in his writing, particularly The Golem, which depicts the Jewish Messiah and Jesus Christ as representatives of a peaceful redemption, only to be chased away by the Maharal of Prague and his violent Golem, who ultimately rampaged through the streets of Prague injuring large numbers of people. In The Golem, Leivick simultaneously condemns any attempts to heal the world through violence, and highlights the fallibility and impotence of all would-be Messiahs. The poem was widely interpreted as a thinly veiled critique of the Bolshevik Revolution, and caused Leivick to be criticized by the Soviet Union and Communist Yiddishists. Leivick stopped writing for the Communist papers in 1929 following their public support for the Arab riots in Palestine and broke off all connections with the left following the Molotov–Ribbentrop Pact of 1939.

Leivick's writing also incorporated his deep childhood wounds from his abusive father and unpleasant experiences with Orthodox Judaism, as well as his years of imprisonment. Leivick's own suffering strongly influenced that of his poetic characters', taking on near-mythic proportions and requiring similarly grandiose acts of redemption.

Many of his poems dealt with themes of illness or exile, and his more realistic works were often set in sweatshops, like the ones Leivick had worked in as a new immigrant in Philadelphia.

Leivick's work strongly resonated with the Yiddish public and helped him become one of the most prominent Yiddish poets in the world.

== Legacy ==
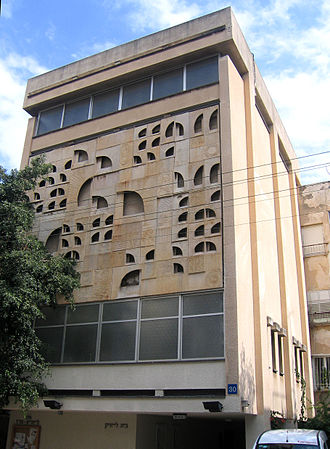
Beit Leivik

The Leyvik House ("Beit Leivik"), named after H. Leivick, is a three-story building in Tel Aviv founded in 1970. It serves as the offices for the Association of Yiddish Writers and Journalists in Israel, the H. Leyvik Publishing House, and the Israeli Center for Yiddish Culture.
