= Mani Leib =

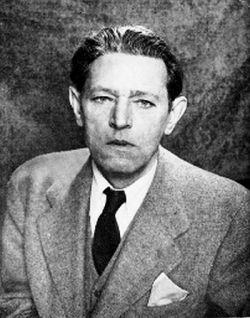
- Born: Mani Leib Brahinsky; December 20, 1883; Nizhyn
- Died: October 4, 1953 (aged 69); New York City
- Occupation: Poet
- Spouse(s): Feyge Rolnick, Rochelle Weprinski
- Children: 5
- Writing career
- Genre: Yiddish-language poetry

Mani Leib (Mani Leyb, Yiddish: מאַני לייב; born Mani Leib Brahinsky, Russian: Мани Лейб Брагинский; 20 December 1883, Nezhin, Russian Empire – 4 October 1953, New York) was a Yiddish-language poet.

== Early life ==
Mani Leib was born in Nizhyn. He was one of eight children; his father sold furs, hides, and animals at regional fairs. His mother supported the family selling hens, geese and eggs. In A mayse vegn zikh (A Story About Myself), he describes her as a fount of spontaneous rhymes, poems, and epigrams.

At the age of 11 Leyb left school to be apprenticed to a bootmaker and as a participant in "revolutionary activities", he was arrested twice while still in his teens.

== Career ==
Leib migrated to the United States at the age of 22 and settled in New York City in 1906. He published his poems in Yiddish newspapers like The Jewish Daily Forward. Writing in the cadences of ordinary speech, he formed a group of poets called Di Yunge ("the Young"). According to the Jewish Virtual Library, Leib's sound poems drew renewed attention to the Yiddish language through their skillful use of alliteration and repetition." These poems proved controversial, and were parodied by Moyshe-Leyb Halpern in 1910; the two, it is argued, became rivals.

Mani Leib also wrote about children. His classic, Yingl Tsingl Khvat, was illustrated by the Russian avant-garde master, El Lissitzky.

He worked throughout his life making shoes and boots, and he references his profession in the poem "I Am." He contracted tuberculosis and lived in a sanatorium for two years. He never lost his belief in "the ability of poetry to transform the mundane into the divine."

His reputation continued to grow after his death, when his collected work was published: Lider un Baladn (Songs and Ballads) in 1955 and Sonetn (Sonnets) in 1961. Lider un Baladn was reprinted in 1963 with parallel Hebrew translations by Shimshon Meltzer, and an introduction by Itzik Manger. The second volume of Lider un Baladn contains a brief autobiography.

== Personal life ==
Leib was married to Feyge Rolnick and had five children. He later left his wife to marry poet Rochelle Weprinski.
