= Di Yunge =

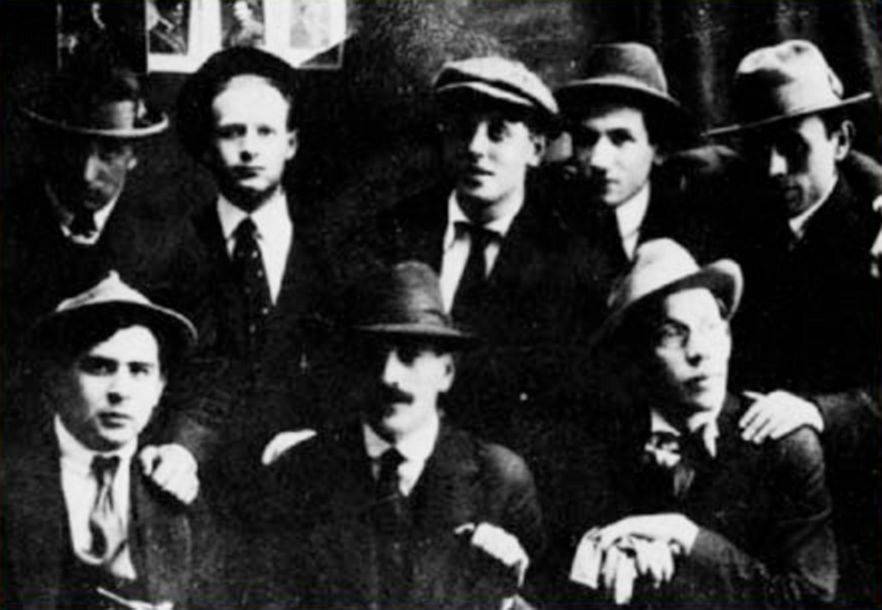
Members of Di Yunge. Seated, left to right: Menakhem Bereisho, Abraham Reisen, Moyshe Leyb Halpern. Standing: A. M. Dillon, H. Leivick, Zishe Landau, Reuben Iceland, Isaac Raboy.

Di Yunge was the first major literary movement of Yiddish poetry in America. During the early 20th century, their work emphasized romanticism, individualism, subjectivism, and free and indirect expression.

== History ==
Yiddish literature was most prominent in Eastern Europe during the century preceding World War I. In the period leading up to World War II, Yiddish literature in Poland and Russia changed in response to the political status of Jews. For a time in-between, countries across the Americas developed a literature of new immigrants, of which Di Yunge was the first important group of Yiddish poets in America.

The writers of the literary movement known as Di Yunge emigrated to the United States from Eastern Europe between 1902 and 1911 as part of a wider migration of Jews from that region. Di Yunge, which translates as "the young ones" or "youngsters", typified the Jewish immigrant: young, unwed, and impoverished. As a group, their influences included Heinrich Heine, German Expressionism, and Russian symbolism. Their work was characterized by its romanticism and advocacy for individualism, subjectivism, and free and indirect expression. Di Yunge was the first school of Yiddish literature to stress an aesthetic standard above a social and national purpose; it sought to eschew the communal and didactic perspectives of the socialist labor poetry of the previous generation (represented by poets such as David Edelstadt and Morris Rosenfeld).

Di Yunge writers included I. J. Schwartz, Mani Leib, Zishe Landau, Itzik Manger, Aaron Zeitlin, Moyshe-Leyb Halpern and David Ignatoff. The group of poets differed in regional origin and politics. Schwartz's Kentucky was the first American Yiddish epic—it tells how the new rural life of Jewish immigrants changed their Jewish spiritual life. Schwartz later won the 1970 Itzik Manger Prize for poetry in Israel.

After World War I and the Russian Revolution of 1905, a less defiant group known as the Insichists (or "In-Zikh"), who sought to "refract the outer world through the prism of the self", replaced Di Yunge.
