= Moyshe Altman =

Yiddish writer

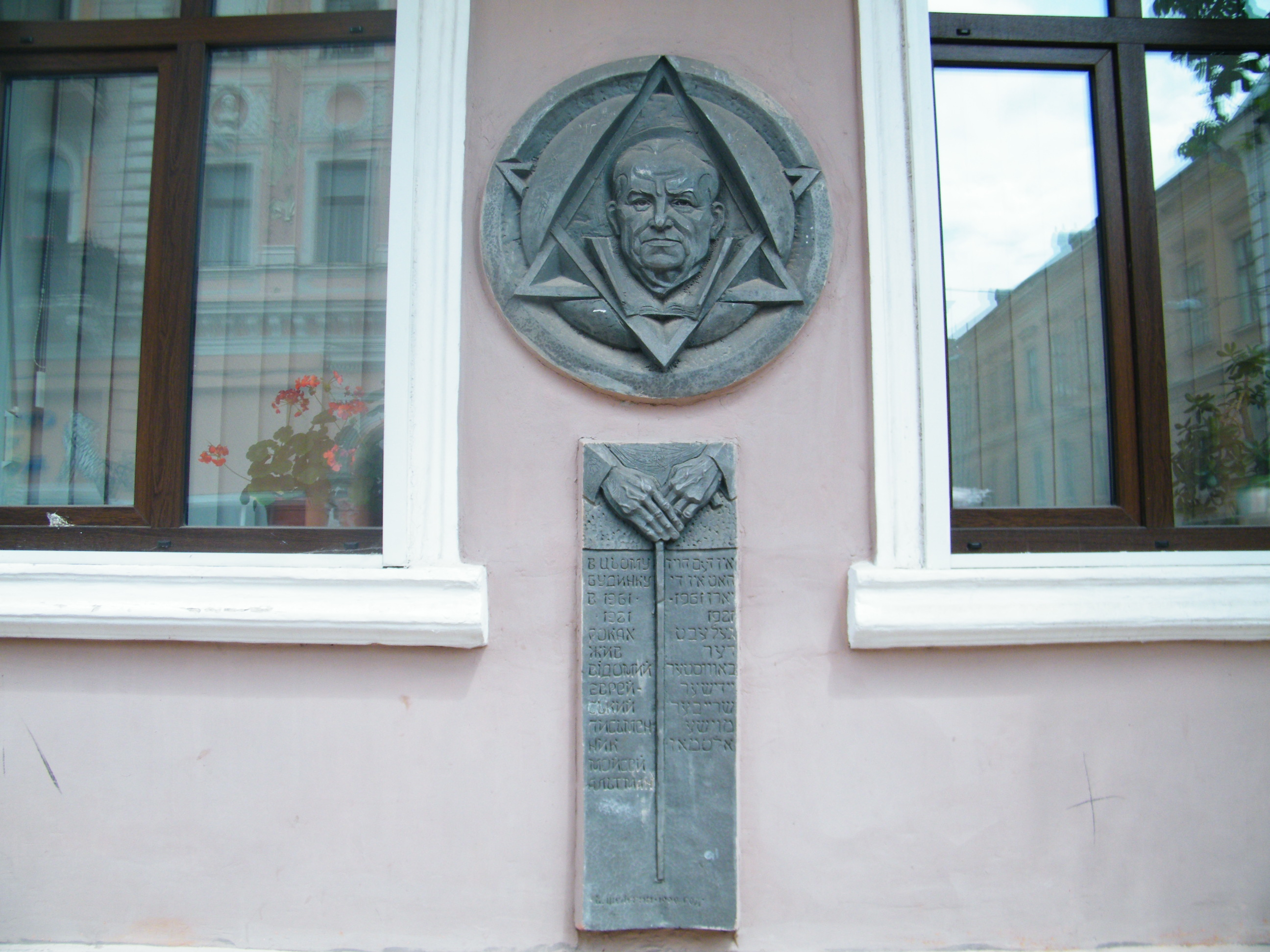
Bas-relief of Moses Altman, on the house where he lived, on Olha Kobylianska Street in Chernivtsi

Moyshe Altman (Yiddish: משה אַלטמאַן; Russian: Моисей Элевич Альтман; Romanian: Moisei Altman) (May 7, 1890, Lipcani, Bessarabia - October 21, 1981, Chernivtsi, USSR) was a Yiddish writer.

== Biography ==
Moyshe Altman was born on May 7, 1890, in Lipcani. He was educated at a school in Kamianets-Podilskyi, where he was a classmate and friend of Jacob Sternberg. In 1914, he published his first poems in Unser lebn, a Yiddish journal in Odessa. In 1919 he moved to Chernivtsi where he published poetry and literary criticism in local journals such as Frayhayt and Dos Naye Leben. With the rise to power of Ion Antonescu and the growing antisemitism, he moved with Sternberg to Chișinău, where he became a member of the Union of Soviet Writers.

In 1944, he returned to Chernivtsi, where he worked as a playwright for the Moscow State Jewish Theater, a Yiddish avant-garde theater, directed by Moïse Goldblat. On April 15, 1949, he was arrested in connection with what was later called Case No. 5390, which targeted writers accused of being Trotskyists and nationalists including Iakov Iakir, Motl-Herș Saktsier, Herzl Rivkin, Ihil Șraibman, Herș-Leib Kajber, Zvi Zelman and more. After a brief investigation into the allegations, Altman was sentenced to 10 years in Siberia. He was sent to the gulag in Tayshet where he stayed until his release in 1953.

== Works ==
- בלענדעניש (Блэндэниш — мираж: две новеллы), Култур: Черновцы, 1926.
- די װינער קאַרעטע (Ди Винэр Каретэ — венская карета, повести и новеллы), Бухарест, 1935.
- אױף די שפּאָרן פֿון מאָטל אומרו: מדרש-פּינחס (Аф Ди Шпорн Фун Мотл Умру: Медрэш-Пинхэс — по следам Мотла-Непоседы: Сказание Пинхоса, согласно листкам Мотла Непоседы, роман), Шолом-Алейхем: Бухарест, 1936.
- שמעטערלינגען (Шмэтэрлинген - мотыльки, роман), Бухарест, 1939.
- דער װאָרצל (Дэр Ворцл - корень: рассказы военных лет), Дэр Эмэс: Москва, 1949.
- געקליבענע װערק (Геклибэнэ Вэрк — избранные произведения), составитель Шлоймэ Бикл, ЦИКО-фарлаг: Нью-Йорк, 1955.
- Корни (рассказы), русский перевод О. Любомирского, Советский писатель: Москва, 1959.
- אױטאָביִאָגראַפֿישע בלעטלעך (Ойтобиографише Блэтлэх — автобиографические листки), Идише Шрифтн: Варшава, 1959.
- Бе-омек hа-рем сипурим ве-романим кецерим (избранные рассказы и романы в переводе на иврит), Тель-Авив, 1967.
- באַם פֿענצטער: זקנישע נאָטיצן (Бам Фэнцтэр: Зкейнише Нотицн — у окна: стариковские заметки), Библиотечка журнала «Советиш Геймланд», №7, Советский писатель: Москва, 1980.
- די װינער קאַרעטע (Ди Винэр Каретэ — венская карета, избранное), предисловие Ихила Шрайбмана, Советский писатель: Москва, 1980.
