= Moyshe-Leyb Halpern =

American poet

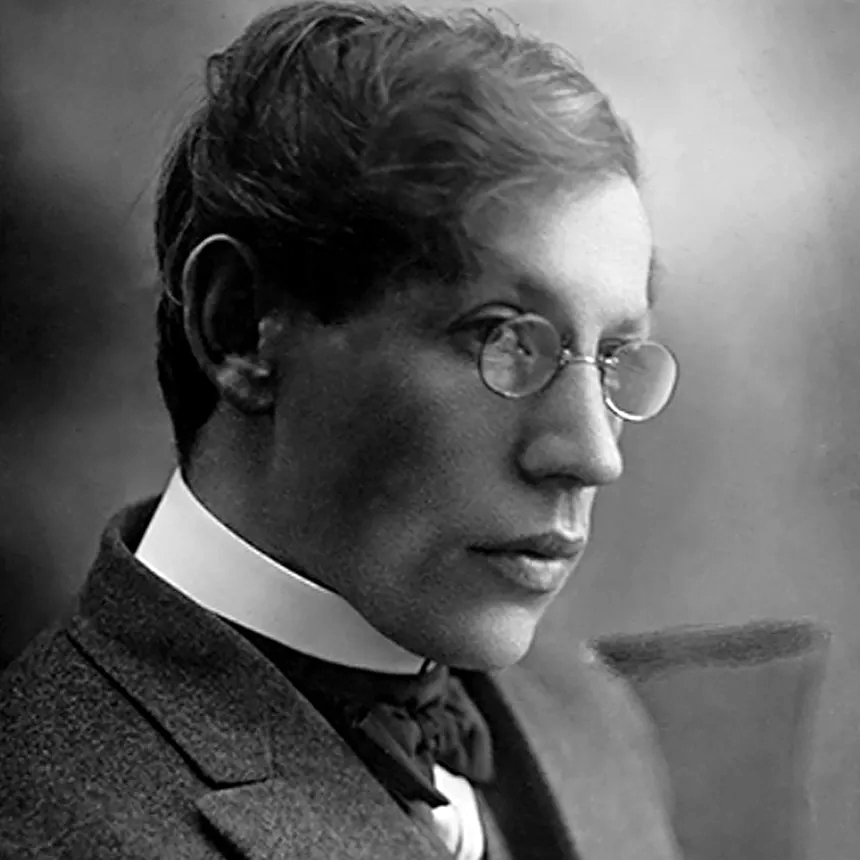
- Born: January 2, 1886; Zlotshev, Kingdom of Galicia and Lodomeria, Austro-Hungarian Empire
- Died: August 31, 1932 (aged 46); New York City, U.S.
- Occupation: Poet
- Spouse: Rayzele Barron
- Children: Issac Halpern
- Writing career
- Language: German, Yiddish
- Genre: Modernist poetry

Moyshe-Leyb Halpern (Yiddish: משה-לײב האַלפּערן) (January 2, 1886 – August 31, 1932) was a Yiddish-language modernist poet. He was born and raised in a traditional Jewish household in Zlotshev, Galicia and brought to Vienna at the age of 12 in 1898 to study commercial art. He then began writing modernist poetry in German. Upon returning to his hometown in 1907, he switched to writing in Yiddish. One of his best-known poems is a satire about his hometown.

In order to avoid the military draft, Halpern emigrated to New York City in 1908 where he became associated with a group of Yiddish poets called Di Yunge (The Young Ones). He published his first book of poetry in 1919, In nyu york (In New York), translated to English by Kathryn Hellerstein

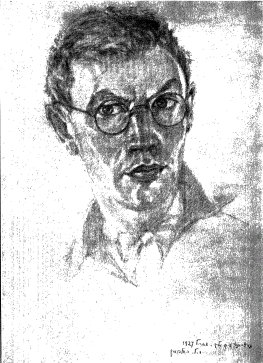
Self-portrait, 1927

That same year he married Rayzele Barron. Their son Isaac (Ying) Halpern was born in 1923. His second book, Di Goldene Pave, was published in 1924. Halpern also wrote for satirical magazines and Morgen Freiheit, a communist Yiddish newspaper. After leaving the Freheit in 1928, he lived in Los Angeles for two years. He died of a heart attack in New York in 1932.

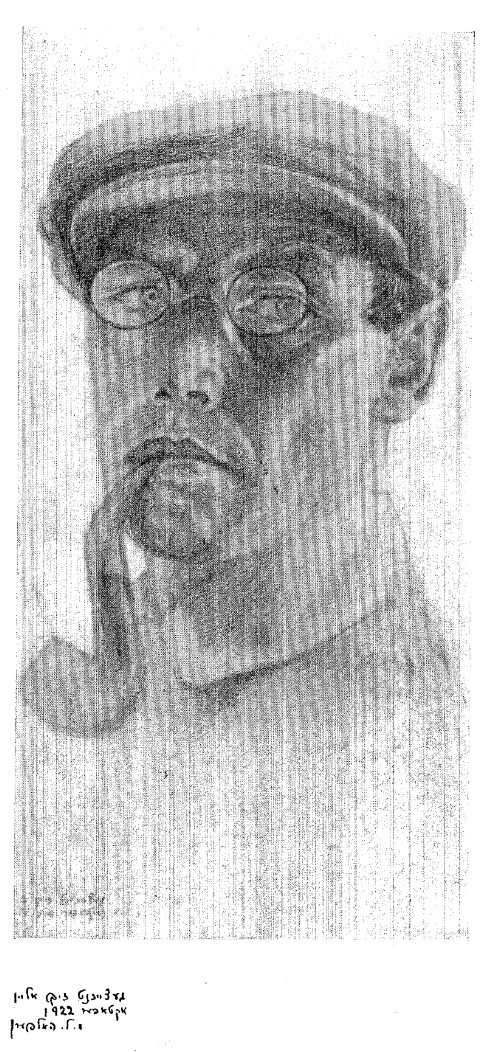
Self-portrait, 1922

Ruth Wisse writes about him thus:

Halpern was generally less sociable than his literary colleagues and everyone who met him in the early immigrant years commented on the solitude which seemed particularly pronounced in him. His fellow poet, Mani Leib, recalled that “we, his friends, like all other Jewish immigrants, also bore the fear of this wondrous unknown called America. But somehow we . . . gave in, adapted ourselves, ‘ripened’ and gradually became . . . real Americans. Not Moishe Leib. He could never compromise or bend.” Though he contributed to the group’s many publications and little magazines, he was slightly apart from the others, the lone wolf, or, as the play on his name suggested, the brooding Lion, Moishe Leib. Almost alone among his fellow writers he failed to find steady work in the small factories, manual trades, or editorial offices where most of the others eventually made their living, and this economic precariousness, which continued practically without interruption until his death, contributed to his image as a troubling nonconformist, and to his artistic distance.

Halpern's importance can be measured in the 50 poems and 400 articles written from 1932 to 1954 on him by his contemporaries, some of whom include Jacob Glatstein, Itzik Manger, and Mani Leib.
