= Eliezer Blum =

Polish-born American Yiddish poet, critic, and translator

Eliezer Blum (1896–1963), known by the pen name B. Alkvit (also Blum-Alquit), was a Polish-born American Yiddish poet, short-story writer, critic, and translator associated with the New York–based In-Zikh (Introspectivist) movement. He contributed poetry, prose, and literary criticism to Yiddish periodicals including Tsukunft, Der Yidisher Kemfer, Di Feder, Fraye Arbeter Shtime, Undzer Bukh, Kern, Kultur, Hamer, Yidish, Oyfkum, Kinder-Zhurnal, Tog, Morgn-Zhurnal, and Di Prese. His work appears in major anthologies and scholarly editions of Yiddish literature.

== Biography ==
Blum was born in 1896 in Chełm, Poland, and immigrated to the United States in 1914, initially working as a tailor, and eventually settled in New York City. Writing primarily under the pen name B. Alkvit, Blum's poetry, fiction, and criticism appeared widely in Yiddish literary circles; from 1926 he was a member of the editorial staff of the Morgn-Zhurnal (Jewish Morning Journal), writing a weekly column for the paper. Blum died in New York in 1963.

== Literary career ==
=== Poetry ===
Blum began publishing poetry in Yiddish periodicals during the 1910s and 1920s. His work reflects modernist experimentation, psychological introspection, and urban themes characteristic of the In-Zikh aesthetic.

His first book of poetry, Vegn tsvey un andere ("About Two and Others"), was published by Inzikh in 1931. A posthumous collection, Lider ("Poems"), consisting largely of the same poems in a revised arrangement along with several newly added poems, was published in 1964 under copyright held by his widow, Etta Blum. His poems were later selected for major anthologies, including Sing, Stranger: A Century of American Yiddish Poetry and A Treasury of Yiddish Poetry, situating his work within the canon of American Yiddish verse.

=== Prose ===
Blum's short stories, written over more than three decades, were collected in the Yiddish volume Oyfn Veg Tsum Perets Skver ("On the Way to Peretz Square", New York: Tsiko, 1958). A selection of 27 of these stories was translated into English by Etta Blum and published posthumously as Revolt of the Apprentices and Other Stories (1969).

=== Translation ===
Blum also worked as a literary translator. In 1926, Blum's Yiddish translation of Arthur Schnitzler's Casanovas Heimfahrt was published under the title Kasanovas aheymker.

== In-Zikh movement ==
Blum was associated with the In-Zikh movement, a New York–based Yiddish avant-garde group that arose in 1919 when Aaron Glanz-Leyeles, Jacob Glatstein, and N. B. Minkoff agreed on a shared poetic program and the founding of the literary journal Inzikh as its organ. Blum's debut appeared in the journal's second issue in February 1920, and he was a co-editor of Inzikh from 1934 to 1938. Liptzin describes Blum's poetry as marked by a compassionate, restrained lyricism and striking, original metaphor, with recurring themes of childhood memory and premonitions of death.

== Critical writing ==
Alongside his creative work, Blum wrote literary criticism and participated in contemporary literary debates. In 1935, Blum's review of Debora Vogel's poetry collection Acacias Bloom, titled "Modern Prose", was published, to which Vogel responded in 1936, and Blum in turn replied. All three pieces are preserved in the scholarly volume Blooming Spaces: The Collected Poetry, Prose, Critical Writing, and Letters of Debora Vogel.

== Legacy ==
Sol Liptzin's A History of Yiddish Literature describes Blum as "the quietest of the Insichists," noting recurring themes of childhood memory and premonitions of death rendered in a compassionate, restrained lyrical style.

Writing in 1931, fellow In-Zikh poet Aaron Glanz-Leyeles praised Blum's poetry collection as one of the most eloquent expressions of Introspectivist lyric achievement, describing the book as a unified, singular work with its own distinct rhythm and character.

Zutra notes that Blum has been called "the fourth one of the triad," alongside fellow In-Zikh poets Aaron Glanz-Leyeles, Jacob Glatstein, and N. B. Minkoff, and argues that his 1931 collection Vegn tsvey un andere represents a distinctive response to Glatstein's poetic influence within the movement.

Blum's poetry and short fiction have been included in major anthologies of American Yiddish literature, and his critical exchange with Debora Vogel is preserved in scholarly editions of her collected work.

== Selected publications ==
=== Poetry ===
- Vegn tsvey un andere (1931)
- Lider (1964)

=== Prose ===
- Oyfn Veg Tsum Perets Skver (1958)
- Revolt of the Apprentices and Other Stories (1969)
- Contribution to Khelmer Yizkor-bukh (Johannesburg: Khelmer Landsmanschaft, 1955)

=== Translation ===
- Kasanovas aheymker (1926)
