= 1960 Israel Song Festival =

Israel Song Festival 1960

Date and venue
- Final: 2 May 1960
- Venue: Heichal HaTarbut, Tel Aviv

Organisation
- Musical director: Gary Bertini
- Presenters: Itzhak Shimoni

Participants
- Number of entries: 9

Vote
- Winning song: "Erev Ba" (Evenfall; Hebrew: ערב בא)

The 1960 Israel Song Festival was the 1st edition of the annual Israel Song Festival. It took place in Tel Aviv and was held at Heichal HaTarbut on 2 May 1960 as part of the 1960 Independence Day celebrations. The show was hosted by Itzhak Shimoni.

Nine songs were selected to participate in the competition. Each song was performed twice on the night, once by a male singer and once by female singer, in order to give precedence to the song over the performing artist.

The winning song was "Erev Ba" (Evenfall; Hebrew: ערב בא), which was written by Oded Avisar and composed by Arie Levanon and was performed by Aliza Kashi and by Shimon Bar.

== History ==
The idea for the competition came from Kol Yisrael producer Israel Daliyot after seeing people celebrating Domenico Modugno's victory in the 1959 Sanremo Music Festival while on vacation in Rome. Daliyot approached the Israel Broadcasting Service, and with involvement of the Prime Minister's Office, the first festival was held as part of the 1960 Independence Day celebrations, using budget allocated for the celebrations, rather than Kol Yisrael budget.

A committee headed by Minister of Health Yisrael Barzilai selected the nine participating songs out of hundreds of songs submitted. The winning song was allocated a prize of 1,500 pounds, while second and third prizes were IL1,000 and IL500. Each prize was split by the writer and composer of the song. The prize was awarded to the winners by Minister of Education & Culture, Abba Eban.

== Format ==
Each song was allocated a male and female singer which performed the song one after the other. Following the performance an interval show was performed by Maîtrise de Radio France while the crowd present in the venue cast its votes. Following the interval, the third, second and first prizes were announced, with each song performed by the two performers (as a duet) after each announcement.

== Songs ==
The song "Leil HaChag" was originally written by Iraqi Jew Shlomo Sha'ashu'a in Arabic and was translated to Hebrew by poet Yosef Lichtenboim. On the night, in each performance of the song, the first verse of the song was sung in Arabic.

== Results ==
Place	Song	Writer	Composer	Performers
1	"Erev Ba" (Evenfall; Hebrew: ערב בא)	Oded Avisar	Arie Levanon	Aliza Kashi, Shimon Bar
2	"HaAlma" (The Maiden; Hebrew: העלמה)	Nathan Alterman	Mordechai Zeira	Rama Samsonov, Gideon Singer
3	"Leil HaChag"/"Laylat al-Eid" (Night of the Holiday; Hebrew: ליל החג; Arabic: ليلة العيد)	Shlomo Sha'asu'a (translated by Yosef Lichtenboim)	Shlomo Hoffmann	Lilith Nagar, Jo Amar
–	"Uzi VeZimra Ya" (The Lord is my strength and song; Hebrew: עוזי וזמרת יה)	biblical	Nahum Nardi	Netania Davrath, William Wolff
–	"Shir Yada'ati" (I Knew a Song; Hebrew: שיר ידעתי)	Fania Bergstein	Moshe Gessner	Lilith Nagar, Jo Amar
–	"Shir HaPelech" (Song of the Shire; Hebrew: שיר הפלך)	Fania Bergstein	Shlomo Yoffe	Netania Davrath, William Wolff
–	"Mechol HaRo'eh" (Dance of the Shepherd; Hebrew: מחול הרועה)	Oded Avisar	Arie Levanon	Aliza Kashi, Shimon Bar
–	"Ayelet Ahavim" (Loved Doe; Hebrew: איילת אהבים)	Moshe Dor	Yosef Hadar	Rama Samsonov, Ilka Raveh
–	"Kumi VeNetze HaSade" (Get Up and We'll Go Out to the Field; Hebrew: קומי ונצא השדה)	I. L. Peretz	Ram Da-Oz	Shulamit Livnat, Shimon Bar
