= Hasye Cooperman =

American Yiddish poet (1907–1992)

- כאַסיע קופּערמאַן
- Born: February 2, 1907; New York City, U.S.
- Died: April 18, 1992 (aged 85); New York City, U.S.
- Other names: Clara Cooperman; Chasye Cooperman
- Education: Hunter College (AB); Columbia University (AM, PhD)
- Occupations: Poet; translator; professor
- Years active: 1924–1992
- Employer: The New School for Social Research
- Movement: Yiddish Introspectivism; Yiddishism
- Spouse: N. B. Minkoff (m. 1932; died 1958)

Hasye Cooperman Minkoff (Yiddish: כאַסיע קופּערמאַן; February 2, 1907 – April 18, 1992) was an American poet, translator, critic, professor, and Yiddishist. She was the first person, and first woman, born in the United States to publish poetry in Yiddish. She was also one of few women affiliated with the Yiddish Introspectivist movement.

== Early life and education ==
Hasye Cooperman was born in 1907 to parents Ephraim and Miriam who had immigrated to New York City from near Kyiv. As a child, she attended secular Yiddish schools run by The Workers Circle, and in 1926 she graduated from its teaching seminary.

She graduated from Hunter College in 1927 with a Bachelor of Arts in French, writing her thesis on the politics of Stendhal. In her youth and at Hunter, she befriended other American-born Yiddish women writers and artists, including Ruth Rubin, Evlin Yehoash Dworkin, the daughter of Yehoash, and Tamara Kahana, the granddaughter of Sholem Aleichem.

A scholar of French Symbolism, Cooperman received a master's degree from Columbia University in 1928, writing her thesis on Remy de Gourmont, and a PhD in French from the university in 1933. Her dissertation on the aesthetics of Stéphane Mallarmé was published as a monograph in 1934. In 1935, the poet and critic R. P. Blackmur reviewed it unfavorably in Poetry, writing that Cooperman was "too much identified with the corpus examined."

== Poetry ==
Cooperman's first poem was published in the Fraye Arbeter Shtime in December 1924. Her poems then appeared in Yiddish literary magazines associated with the In-Zikh movement in New York, alongside work by Jacob Glatstein, Milton R. Konvitz, and Mikhl Licht. In 1928, her poetry was also included in Ezra Korman's anthology of Yiddish women's poetry, Yidishe dikhterins (Yiddish: ייִדישע דיכטערינס).

In 1929, she published her only Yiddish collection, Yagd (Yiddish: יאַגד), which included adapted versions of some of her earlier poems. Evlin Yehoash Dworkin illustrated the frontispiece and dust jacket. In 1932, Cooperman published The Chase, a self-translation of selections of Yagd into English alongside original English poetry.

Cooperman continued to publish poetry and translations in English, including in the Beloit Poetry Journal, Midstream, and Poet Lore. Her work was included in several Poetry Society of America anthologies. Her two English collections, Men Walk the Earth (1953) and The Making of a Woman (1985), were published through vanity presses. In 1957, she received the National Award for Poetry from the American Literary Association.

Her Yiddish poetry was translated into English in several 20th-century anthologies. In the 21st century, it has been translated into both Polish and English, most recently by Kathryn Hellerstein and Tyler Kliem.

== Teaching ==
Beginning in the late 1930s, Cooperman and her husband, N. B. Minkoff, taught courses on Yiddish literature at The New School for Social Research. From 1950 until her death, she was a professor of American and comparative literature there, where she continued teaching courses on literature and aesthetics; from 1961 to 1967, she was head of the literature department at The New School.

Throughout the 1970s and 1980s, Cooperman lectured Yiddish radio programs on WEVD-FM, in cooperation with Touro College and the Jewish Teachers' Seminary and People's University.

== Personal life ==
In 1932, Cooperman married the Yiddish poet and critic N. B. Minkoff in Greenwich, Connecticut. They had two children.

Cooperman was a member of the Poetry Society of America and the James Joyce Society of America.
