= Kathryn Hellerstein =

American academic

Kathryn Ann Hellerstein
- Born: 1952 (age 73–74); Cleveland, Ohio, U.S.
- Education: Wellesley College Brandeis University (BA) Stanford University (MA, PhD)
- Occupations: Yiddishist; professor; translator; author
- Spouse: David Stern
- Awards: Guggenheim Fellowship (1999) National Jewish Book Award (2014)
- Website: kathrynhellerstein.com

Kathryn Ann Hellerstein (Yiddish: קאַטרין העלערשטײן; born 1952) is an American academic and scholar of Yiddish-language poetry, translation, and Jewish American literature. Specializing in Yiddish, she is currently a professor of Germanic Languages and Literatures and former Ruth Meltzer Director of the Jewish Studies Program at the University of Pennsylvania. She is known for her research focus on Yiddish women writers, notably Kadya Molodowsky, Malka Heifetz Tussman, and Celia Dropkin.

== Personal life ==
Hellerstein was born in 1952 in Cleveland, Ohio. Her father, Herman Kopel Hellerstein (1916–1993), was a cardiologist born in Dillonvale, Ohio. Her mother, Mary Feil Hellerstein (1922–2011), was a pediatrician born and raised in Cleveland. Hellerstein's father served in the United States Army during World War II and liberated the Bergen-Belsen concentration camp. Her distant relatives were from Brest-Litovsk in the Russian Empire (present-day Brest, Belarus), Bavaria, and near present-day Prague. Alongside her five siblings, Hellerstein was raised in Cleveland Heights, close to the University Hospitals Cleveland Medical Center where both of her parents practiced. She grew up in a Reform Jewish household.

Hellerstein considers herself a feminist.

Hellerstein is married to American academic David Stern. In 2002, The Daily Pennsylvanian reported that Hellerstein and her husband would have likely stayed in Illinois if the University of Pennsylvania had not jointly offered both of them jobs as spouses.

== Education ==
=== University ===
Hellerstein attended Wellesley College in the early 1970s for two years before transferring to Brandeis University, where she graduated in 1974 with a degree in English. While at Brandeis, she enrolled in courses on Yiddish literature and translation of songs.

Upon graduation, Hellerstein entered graduate school at Stanford University as an Edith Mirrielees Poetry Fellow, earning a master's degree in English and creative writing. Hellerstein continued her education at Stanford, earning a PhD in English and American literature. During her PhD program, she became inspired to learn Yiddish after reading Irving Howe's book World of Our Fathers: The Journey of the East European Jews to America and the Life They Found and Made, which featured a chapter on Yiddish literature and poetry of the Lower East Side.

=== Language study ===
While at Stanford, then PhD student Marcia Falk introduced Hellerstein to Yiddish writer Malka Heifetz Tussman, who was living in Berkeley, California at the time. Hellerstein became Tussman's pupil. Every Friday for the coming years, she learned Yiddish poetry and translation under the tutelage of Tussman.

In 1977, Hellerstein took YIVO summer courses in Yiddish at the instruction of Mordkhe Schaechter, learning alongside other students such as Aaron Lansky, Jonathan Boyarin, and Steven Zipperstein.

After graduating from her PhD program in 1980, Hellerstein moved to Israel to conduct intensive Hebrew study in an ulpan.

== Academic career ==
=== Teaching ===
In 1981, Hellerstein began to teach freshman English courses at Stanford and, later, English courses at Wellesley. In 1991, she began to teach English literature and Yiddish language courses at the University of Pennsylvania. She continues to teach Yiddish courses at the university, alongside David Botwinik's son, Alexander.

=== Women writers ===
Hellerstein became interested in women writers of Yiddish at the same time as her ongoing work with Tussman. Tussman showed Hellerstein an anthology of Yiddish women writers by Ezra Korman, titled Yidishe dikhterins (Yiddish: ייִדישע דיכטערינס, "Yiddish Women Poets"), intriguing Hellerstein.

In 1999, Hellerstein was awarded a Guggenheim Fellowship for her research focus on Yiddish women poets.

=== Ashkenazic Jewry and China ===
In 2000, Hellerstein visited Jerusalem and met Irene Eber, a scholar who was studying Central European Jewish refugees in China from the war period. Eber served as a mentor to Hellerstein on the research focus between Ashkenazic Jewry and China for over a decade. In 2019, Hellerstein edited a collection of Eber's scholarly articles and essays on Jewish and Chinese cultures, titled Jews in China: Cultural Conversations, Changing Perceptions.

After working with Eber and visiting the Shanghai neighborhood of Hongkou in 2007, Hellerstein became inspired to research the transculturation of Ashkenazic Jewry and China. In 2022, Hellerstein released a book, titled China and Ashkenazic Jewry: Transcultural Encounters, on the topic.

=== Research, translation, and works ===
In the early 1980s, Hellerstein wrote an essay analyzing the history and purpose of Yiddish women writing, titled "A Question of Tradition: Women Poets in Yiddish." Expanding on her essay, Hellerstein released a full-length monograph on the topic in 2014, titled A Question of Tradition: Women Poets in Yiddish, 1586-1987. That same year, the book was awarded the Jewish Book Council's National Jewish Book Award in the women's studies category. In 2015, the book also won the Fenia and Yaakov Levant Memorial Prize, sponsored by the Modern Language Association.

Hellerstein, with the help of Tussman, translated Moyshe-Leyb Halpern's first book of poetry In Nyu-York (Yiddish: אין ניו־יאָרק, "In New York") into English, which was published in 1982 as In New York: A Selection. This selection was originally adapted from Hellerstein's PhD dissertation and her critical analyses of Halpern's poetry.

In 1999, Hellerstein translated and published a book of Kadya Molodowsky's poetry, titled Paper Bridges: Selected Poems of Kadya Molodowsky. Chana Bloch was one of two anonymous readers of Hellerstein's manuscript, which was initially rejected. In 2001, Hellerstein co-edited the anthology Jewish American Literature: A Norton Anthology with Jules Chametzky, John Felstiner, and Hilene Flanzbaum.

Throughout her academic career, Hellerstein has researched and translated poetry of other Yiddish women poets into English, including Irena Klepfisz, Fradl Shtok, Debora Vogel, Celia Dropkin, Anna Margolin, Rachel Korn, Miriam Ulinover, and her mentor, Malka Heifetz Tussman. She has also conducted research on the Jewish American writer Cynthia Ozick.
