= David Krivoshei =

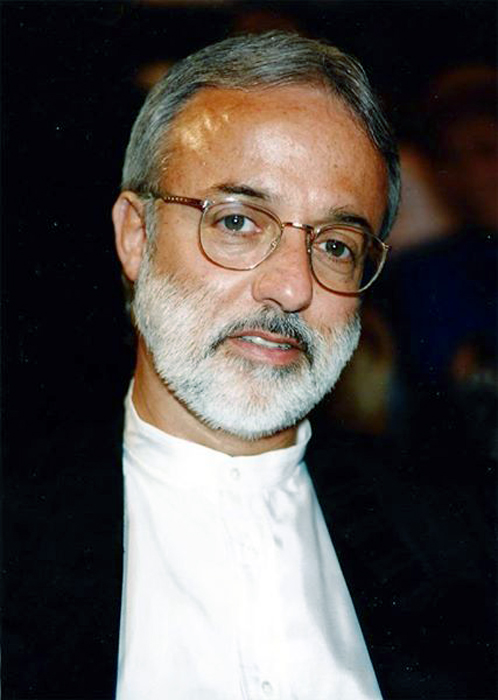
David Krivoshei, 1988

David Krivoshei or David Krivoshey (Hebrew: דוד קריבושי, sometimes transliterated as David Kriboshi; born July 1, 1944) is an Israeli composer, conductor, and musical arranger, a prominent figure in the field of popular music and jazz in Israel.

After graduation from school, David joined the Israeli Air Force Band. In 1960s he joined the backing band of Arik Einstein named "The Einsteins", where he played organ and made music arrangements.

Since 1966 David Krivoshei composed or arranged a large number of songs.

== Notable songs ==
One of the early hit songs composed by Krivoshei is My daughter, are you crying or laughing?, words by Yoav Katz, written in 1967, after the Six-Day War. It was performed by various artists.

In 1970, the duo Hedva and David won the first place at the Yamaha Song Festival in Tokyo, Japan, with the song "I Dream of Naomi" (אני חולם על נעמי "Ani Cholem Al Naomi"), lyrics: Tirtza Atar, music: David Krivoshei.

== Family ==
David's father, Mordechai, immigrated to Mandate Palestine with his family (four brothers and four sisters) from the city of Gomel, Belarus in 1924. His mother, Tamara Tenenbaum, immigrated to Mandate Palestine from Poland in the 1930s. David has two daughters.
