= David Tal =

David Tal may refer to:

- David Tal (historian), expert on Israel's security and diplomatic history and U.S. disarmament policy
- David Tal (politician) (born 1950), four-time Member of Knesset and member of Israel's Kadima party
- David Tal (singer), member of the duo Hedva and David
