= Aliza Kashi =

Aliza Kashi עליזה קשי
- Born: 1936 (age 89–90); Jerusalem, Mandatory Palestine (Israel)
- Genres: Israeli pop, American pop, French pop, samba, bolero
- Occupation: Singer
- Instrument: Vocals
- Years active: 1960–2001
- Labels: Hed Arzi; Mocambo; Indica; Jubilee

Aliza Kashi (Hebrew: עליזה קשי; born 1936) is an Israeli singer. In 1960, she won the first edition of the Israel Song Festival with her performance of "Erev Ba" ("Night Comes"). In 1961, her single "Shovach Yonim" ("The Dovecote") became a top ten hit in Israel.

== Life and career ==
Born in Jerusalem, Kashi debuted as a soloist in the Nahal Entertainment Troupe. "Ya Mishlati" ("The Base") was one of her first hits. She also studied at the Hebrew University of Jerusalem. Later, she joined the Green Onion ensemble and recorded her first extended play for Hed Arzi.

In 1961, Kashi made nightclub appearances in Brussels, Belgium and Paris, France. The following year, she traveled to Argentina to perform on Argentine television and resided in Buenos Aires. While in Argentina, she signed contracts to perform in Uruguay, Chile, and Peru.

In 1963, Kashi toured Brazil and recorded an album titled A Internacional Aliza Kashi (The International Aliza Kashi) for the Mocambo record label. The album features a variety of international songs, including "Yo te pido, Dios", "Non, je ne regrette rien", "Erev Ba", "I Can't Stop Loving You", "Hava Nagila", "Samba de uma nota só", and "Et maintenant". That same year, she made a series of recordings in Costa Rica for the Indica record label. Her Indica recordings include the album Aliza Kashi, la dama (Aliza Kashi, the Lady), which was also released in Mexico, Brazil, United States, Europe, and Israel. These recordings were highly successful throughout Mexico, Europe, and South America and Aliza Kashi, la dama was known as "the long play that put Indica on the international market". She also appeared in the Argentine-Mexican film La diosa impura (1963), singing "Amor Que Acabou".

In 1966, Kashi went to the United States and toured with American comedian Jack Benny in his show An Hour and 60 Minutes with Jack Benny, which included a successful performance at Caesars Palace in Las Vegas. She appeared once on The Ed Sullivan Show and many times on The Merv Griffin Show.

In February 1967, Kashi signed a record deal with Jubilee Records. In June, she gave a concert at The Town Hall in New York City. Robert Windeler, who reviewed the concert for The New York Times, wrote: "Miss Kashi is a beautiful young Israeli, who sings in Hebrew and at least five other languages, always well and in a strong voice that is capable of conveying a wide range of emotions. This was her New York debut, and a full house of loyal fans was there to greet her […]." Her first Jubilee studio album was titled Aliza Kashi. In July, Cash Box named Aliza Kashi one of its "Pop Best Bets". In August, Record World editors included Aliza Kashi in their "Albums of the Week" section (of the 5 August issue) and gave it a positive review: "Aliza Kashi, Israeli songstress making a name on the Merv Griffin TVer and in niteries, bows with a list of evergreens she makes even fresher and greener".

In 1968, Kashi released her second Jubilee album, Hello, People!. Billboard included it in its Special Merit Picks section and wrote: "With a boost from the exposure of the Merv Griffin Show, Miss Kashi is coming on in popularity. Her vivacious personality and charm come across in this LP recorded live at a hotel. Her voice packs a wallop in "Goin' Out of My Head," among others. Her ad libs to the audience are a show in themselves."

== Discography ==
=== Extended plays ===
- Lama? (Hed Arzi, 1960)
- Meet Aliza Kashi (Hed Arzi)
- The Young Man and the Sun (Hed Arzi, 1962)

=== Studio albums ===
- A Internacional Aliza Kashi (Mocambo, 1963)
- Aliza Kashi, la dama (Indica, 1964)
- Aliza Kashi (Jubilee, 1967)
- Hello, People! (Jubilee, 1968)
- Aliza Kashi (Jubilee, 1969)

== Filmography ==
- La diosa impura (1963)
