= Jo Amar =

Moroccan-Israeli singer (1930–2009)

Jo Amar ג'ו עמר

Background information
- Born: Yosef Amar יוסף עמר; 1 June 1930; Settat, Morocco
- Origin: Morocco
- Died: 26 June 2009 (aged 79) Woodmere, New York, U.S.
- Genres: Mizrahi, Jewish.
- Occupation: Singer (hazzan)

Yosef "Jo" Amar (Hebrew: יוסף "ג'ו" עמר, Arabic: يوسف (جو) عمار) (1 June 1930 – 26 June 2009) was a Moroccan-Israeli singer and hazzan, notable for his pioneering of the Mizrahi genre and his influence on many artists such as Zohar Argov (who would cover one of Amar’s songs "Barcelona"), Eyal Golan, Ishai Levi and Oren Hen.

== Biography ==
Joseph (Jo) Amar was born in Settat, and began his singing career in the late 1940s in Morocco. In 1956, Amar emigrated from Morocco to Israel where he lived on Moshav Yad Rambam.

Jo Amar performed with Lilith Nagar in the 1960 Israel Song Festival, winning third place with the song "Leil HaChag." The first verse of the song was sung in Arabic.

He was a pioneer in the introduction of Moroccan Jewish liturgical music to Israel. He became associated with mizrahi music, mixing the melodies of traditional Sephardic Jewish music with Arabic music and Western music.

Amar tried to introduce Mizrahi music originating in Middle Eastern or North African countries to mainstream Israeli culture. He then moved to New York City in 1970, where he performed music and became noted for his work as a Jewish cantor. Within twenty years, he moved back to Israel.

He published an anthology of liturgical music from Morocco and recorded more than 20 albums, including two with the Israeli Andalusian Orchestra (התזמורת האנדלוסית הישראלית). His hits include "Yismah Moshe", "Shalom LeVen Dodi", "Barcelona", "Song of the Drunkard", "Ani Havatzelet HaSharon", and many more.

In 2008, a musical evening of tribute was held in his honor in Jerusalem. Mayor Uri Lupoliansky presented Amar with a certificate of appreciation, and selections from a movie on his life, beginning with his childhood in Morocco, were screened.

== Death ==
Jo Amar died aged 79, at the home of his son in Woodmere, New York. He had been suffering from Parkinson's disease. He was buried at Moshav Yad Rambam, in central Israel.

== See also ==
- Music of Israel

== Sources ==
- Menashe Ravina, Shlomo Skolsky (Ed.): Who is who in ACUM. Authors, Composers and Music Publishers, biographical notes and principal works. Acum Ltd., Societe d'Auteurs, Compositeurs et Editeurs de Musique en Israel, 1965.
