= Dropkin =

Dropkin is a surname. Notable people with the surname include:

- Celia Dropkin (1887–1956), Russian-born American poet
- Korey Dropkin (born 1995), American curler
