= In-Zikh =

American Yiddish modernist poetry movement

In-Zikh (Yiddish: אין זיך, "In the Self"; also transliterated In Sich), also known as Introspectivism or Insichism, was a modernist movement in American Yiddish poetry that arose in 1919.

The movement was founded by Aaron Glanz-Leyeles, Jacob Glatstein, and N. B. Minkoff, who agreed on a shared literary outlook and established the journal In Sich as an outlet for their work and that of like-minded poets. The established poets Yehoash and H. Leivick were early supporters of the new group.

The movement soon attracted a number of younger immigrant poets, among them Eliezer Blum (pen name B. Alkvit), Bernard Lewis, Kalman Heisler, Reuben Ludwig, Jacob Stodolsky, and Alef Katz. In later years the journal published work by additional writers, including J. I. Segal, Mikhl Likht, Eliezer Greenberg, A. Lutzky, Aaron Kurtz, Shloime Schwartz, Celia Drapkin, Esther Shumiacher-Hirshbein, and Anna Margolin.

By the late 1930s In Sich appeared irregularly and was edited by a rotating committee that included Leyeles, Glatstein, Blum, and Y. A. Vaysman; the journal's final issue appeared in December 1940.
