= Dwora Gilula =

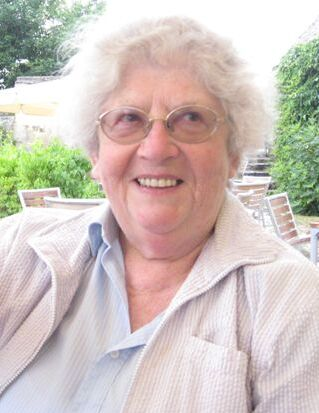
Dwora Gilula

Dwora Gilula (((Hebrew: דבורה גילולה; born 9 May 1934, Lublin,Poland) is the Louis Lipsky Professor Emerita of Drama in the Department of Classical Studies and the Theater Studies at the Hebrew University in Jerusalem. She also edits and translates from five different languages into Hebrew, including Greek and Latin literature. Her research interests are ancient Roman and Greek drama and theater, Greek oratory, and Nathan Alterman's works. She received the Israel Prize for Literature, Poetry and Translation in 2025.

== Early life and education ==
Dwora Gilula (née Cynamon) was born in 1934 in Lublin, Poland, to Simcha Cynamon and Leah (Lola) (née Glatstein). Lola was the sister of the Yiddish poet and writer Jacob Glatstein. In February 1946, after World War II, she immigrated to Israel as part of the Youth Aliyah movement as an orphaned Holocaust survivor, and was educated at Kibbutz Kfar Masaryk.

In 1961, she received her Bachelor of Arts degree in Hebrew literature and Bible at the Hebrew University in Jerusalem, and in 1966, she received a Master's of Arts in Classical Studies. She received her PhD in Classical Studies in 1977 from the Faculty of Humanities, Department of Classical Studies at Hebrew University. She wrote her PhD thesis, under the supervision of Prof. Baruch Lifshitz, on the comedy "The Eunuch" by Terentius, (Terence) written in Roman. The main focus of the work was the creation of a scientific edition of the play: the interpretation of the text, linguistic and literary, as well as the writing of introductions and appendices.

Starting in 1963, while still a student, she began teaching in the Department of Classical Studies at the Hebrew University.

== Career ==
Upon receipt of her PhD in 1977, she joined the university faculty as an associate teacher in the Department of Classical Studies. Over time, she rose through the academic ranks, becoming Senior Lecturer in 1982, Associate Professor in 1991, Full Professor in 1996, until retiring as Professor Emerita in 2002. In 1987-1983 and 1990-1988, she served as head of the Department of Theater Studies, part of the Faculty of Humanities at the Hebrew University.

While living abroad from 1969 to 1972, she taught classical studies at the University of Illinois at Chicago as an assistant professor.

Together with Professor Eli Rosik, Professor of Theatre Arts at Tel Aviv University, she founded the Israeli Society for the Advancement of Theater Research in 1988, and served as its chairwoman from 1992 to 1996. In addition to her position at Hebrew University, she founded the Department of Theater and the Integration of Arts in Teaching at the David Yellin College of Education, in 1999, where she lectured and served as the head of the department until 2003.

For many years, Gilula edited several theatre-related periodicals/journals, including "Eskolot", "Bamah" (Israeli Theatre Magazine ) and its follow-on journal "Bamot v'Masach" (Scene and Screen), which began publishing in 2009 after Bamah ceased publication. Its last issue, Number 11, was published in February 2014.

In addition to her extensive editing and translation of classics, from Latin, Greek, French, English, and Polish into Hebrew, Gilula researched the works of the poet and playwright, Nathan Alterman. She published editions of some of his never-published work, including an expanded and annotated version of his "Tur Hashevii" (The Seventh Column). Some of the poems had never seen the light of day. The project began in 2009 and lasted until 2017, when the sixth volume was released.

In 2025, she was awarded the Israel Prize, granted to Israelis who have contributed significantly to Israeli culture. In selecting Gilula, the prize committee stated that her classic language translations, which have received many accolades, have contributed significantly to the Israeli bookshelf.

== Personal life ==
She was married to Prof. Mordechai Gilula (1936–2002), a linguist and Egyptologist, and is the mother of Moshe, Simcha, and Leah Chaya. Her daughter, Dr. Leah Gilula, is the director of the IIsrael Goor Theater Archives and Museum. She is the niece of the Yiddish writer Jacob Glatstein.

== Bibliography ==
=== Books in Hebrew ===
- Gilula, Dwora, Socrates in the Clouds, Ancient Theatre and Drama, (1996), Jerusalem, Magnes Press, ISBN 965-223-909-7
- Gilula, Dwora, Facing Retribution with Applause: Nathan Alterman and the Hebrew Stage, (2008), Tel Aviv, Kibbutz Hameuchad Publishing House

=== Translations from Latin into Hebrew ===
- Epistulae Morales Vol. I, by Seneca the Younger, (2017) Jerusalem, Magnes Press, ISBN 978-965-7763-28-5
- Epistulae Morales Vol. II, by Seneca the Younger, (2019) Jerusalem, Magnes Press, ISBN 978-965-7008-86-7.
- Amphitruo by Plautus, (2015) Jerusalem, Magnes Press, ISBN 978-965-493-781-8
- Strategemata by Frontinus, (2014) Jerusalem, Magnes Press, ISBN 978-965-493-739-9
- Aulularia by Plautus, (2007) Jerusalem, Magnes Press, ISBN 978-965-493-339-1
- The Brothers, a Comedy, (2002) by Publius Terentius (Terence), Jerusalem, Magnes Press, ISBN 978-965-493-138-0
- Pseudolus, A Comedy by Plautus (2002) Jerusalem, Magnes Press, ISBN 965-493-110-9
- Phormio Comedy by Publius Terentius (Terence), (1995) Jerusalem, Magnes Press, ISBN 965-223-893-7
- The Eunuch by Publius Terentius (Terence) (1999), Jerusalem, Magnes Press, ISBN 965-493-031-5
- Miles Gloriosus by Plautus, (1989) Jerusalem, Magnes Press, ISBN 965-223-721-3

=== Translations from Greek into Hebrew ===
- Lives, Lycurgus and Numa by Plutarchus,(2016) Jerusalem:Magnes Press, ISBN 978-965-493-896-9
- Sparta, Sayings and Customs by Plutarchus, (2011) Jerusalem, Magnes Press, ISBN 978-965-493-572-2
- The Constitution of the Spartans by Xenophon,(2001) Jerusalem, Magnes Press, ISBN 978-965-493-570-8
- Orations by Andocides, (2008) Jerusalem, Magnes Press, ISBN 978-965-493-303-2
- Knights by Aristophanes, (2006) Jerusalem, Magnes Press, ISBN 965-493-289-X
- Against Timarchos On Male Love, by Aeschines, (2005), Jerusalem, Magnes Press, ISBN 965-493-239-3
- Ars Poetica by Quintus Horatius Flaccus (Horace) (2004) Jerusalem, Magnes Press, ISBN 965-493-190-7
- Ploutus by Aristophanes, Jerusalem, Magnes Press, (1991) ISBN 965-223-754-X

=== Translations from English into Hebrew ===
- Pygmalion, A Romance in Five Acts by George Bernard Shaw, (2016) Jerusalem, Magnes Press, ISBN 978-965-7755 -21-1

=== Translations from French into Hebrew ===
- The Misanthrope, by Molière, (2015) Rishon Lezion, Levine Books

=== Translations edited by Dwora Gilula ===
- Peace, A Comedy, by Aristophanes, Translated by Ziva Caspi, Edited by Dwora Gilula, (2005) Jerusalem, Magnes Press, ISBN 965-493-201-6
- The Clouds, by Aristophanes, Translated by Ziva Caspi, Edited by Dwora Gilula, (2001) Jerusalem, Magnes Press, ISBN 965-493-190-5
- The Wasps, by Aristophanes, Translated by Ziva Caspi, Edited by Dwora Gilula, (2000) Jerusalem, Magnes Press, ISBN 965-493-070-6
- The Frogs by Aristophanes, Translated by Ziva Caspi, Edited by Dwora Gilula, (1998) Jerusalem, Magnes Press, ISBN 965-223-983-6
- Thesmophoriazusae by Aristophanes, Translated by Ziva Caspi, Edited by Dwora Gilula, (1997) Jerusalem, Magnes Press, ISBN 965-223-956-9
- Acharnians by Aristophanes, Translated by Ziva Caspi, Edited by Dwora Gilula, (1994) Jerusalem, Magnes Press, Catalog # 45–301049
- Asheri, David, Edited by Dwora Gilula, A Possession for All Times, Greek Historians and History Writing in Greece and Rome, 2004, Jerusalem, Magnes Press, (2004) ISBN 965-493-178-8

=== Journals and Articles ===
- Gilula, Dwora, P. OXY. 2737 and Aristophanes' Early Career, Zeitschrift für Papyrologie und Epigraphik 81 (1990) 101–102
- Edited by David Asheri and Dwora Gilula, Eshkolot Vol. II-III New Series, (1978) Jerusalem, Magnes Press
- Edited by Dwora Gilula, Eshkolot Vol. I New Series, (1976) Jerusalem, Magnes Press

=== Nathan Alterman books edited by Dwora Gilula ===
- Alterman, Nathan (posthumous) edited by Dwora Gilula, Last Days of Ur- A Play, (1990) Tel Aviv, Kibbutz Hameuchad Publishing House
- Alterman, Nathan, edited by Dwora Gilula, Moments (Vol II and III), (2021) Tel Aviv, Kibbutz Hameuchad Publishing House
- Alterman, Nathan, edited by Dwora Gilula, The Seventh Column (6 volumes) (2009-2017) Tel Aviv, Kibbutz Hameuchad Publishing House
