= David Stern (academic) =

American scholar

- Awards: Guggenheim Fellowship (2004)

Academic background
- Education: Columbia University (BA); Harvard University (PhD)

Academic work
- Discipline: Hebrew literature
- Institutions: University of Pennsylvania; Harvard University

David M. Stern is an American scholar of Hebrew literature. He is the Harry Starr Professor of Classical and Modern Hebrew and Jewish Literature at Harvard University.

== Biography ==
Stern received his B.A. from Columbia College and Ph.D. from Harvard University. He taught at the University of Pennsylvania and was the Berg Professor of Classical Hebrew Literature before joining Harvard's faculty in 2015. His work has focused on interpreting works of Jewish literature in their historical and cultural contexts as well as the material history of Jewish literary works, with a specialization in Classical Rabbinic and Medieval Hebrew literature.

Stern received a Guggenheim Fellowship in 2004. He is married to Kathryn A. Hellerstein, professor of Jewish studies at the University of Pennsylvania.
