= William Wolff =

German-British journalist and rabbi (1927–2020)

Rabbi William Wolff
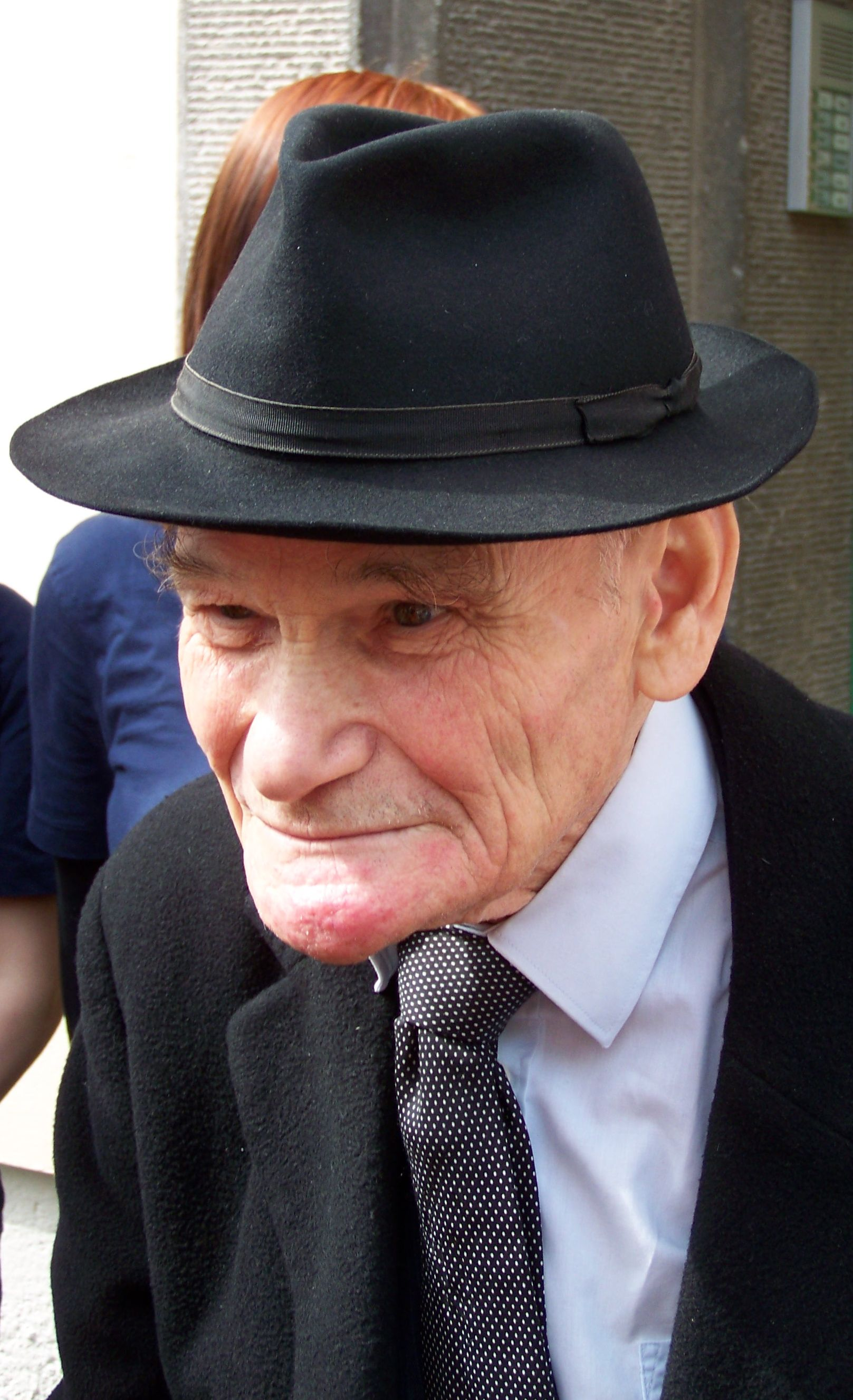

Personal life
- Born: Wilhelm Wolff; 13 February 1927 Berlin, Germany
- Died: 8 July 2020 (aged 93) London, England, United Kingdom
- Occupation: former Rabbi of West London Synagogue

Religious life
- Religion: Judaism

Jewish leader
- Synagogue: West London Synagogue

William Wolff (born Wilhelm Wolff; 13 February 1927 – 8 July 2020), also known as Willy Wolff, was a German-British journalist and rabbi.

== Life ==
Wolff was born in Berlin on 13 February 1927 as one of three children of German Jews. When he was six years old, his parents fled to Amsterdam with them and from there to London in 1939.

After studies, including economics, Wolff became a journalist. He worked as a department head at the Daily Mirror. Wolff was initially responsible for domestic policy, but then switched to foreign policy with the special topic of Britain's accession to the European Economic Community. He was responsible for company news for four years. In Germany, he also appeared in the early 1970s on the television program.

From 1979 to 1984, Wolff received an education at Leo Baeck College; in early July 1984, he received the Semicha (rabbinical ordination) in London. He worked, among other places, at the West London Synagogue, in Newcastle upon Tyne (1986-1990), in Milton Keynes (1990-1993), Reading and Brighton (1993-1997) and in Wimbledon (1997-2002). On 23 April 2002, he was appointed to the position of regional rabbi of Mecklenburg-Vorpommern in Schwerin, where he looked after three Jewish communities. In 2005, he was elected deputy chairman of the General Rabbinical Conference in Germany. In 2014 he received honorary citizenship in Schwerin on 27 January, the day of commemoration of the victims of Nazism. Wolff's contract as a regional rabbi ended on 31 March 2015. He retained the title of regional rabbi and wanted to continue working on a voluntary basis to a limited extent. However, he intended to spend most of his time in England in the future, where he lived in Henley-on-Thames. His successor was Yuriy Kadnykov.

In April 2016, the documentary Rabbi Wolff by director Britta Wauer was released in German cinemas. It was one of the three most successful German documentaries in 2016.

On 12 June 2017, he was awarded "Honorary Citizenship of the City of Rostock" in recognition of his extraordinary and lasting services to the Jewish community of Rostock, the interreligious dialogue and the common good of the citizens of the Hanseatic City of Rostock.

Wolff died on 8 July 2020 at the age of 93 in London. The Jewish Chronicle remembered him as the "'Ray of hope' rabbi who made the world laugh".
