= Aaron Glanz-Leyeles =

American Yiddish writer (1889–1966)

- אהרן לעיעלעס-גלאנצז
- Born: Aaron Glanz; March 5, 1889; Włocławek, Russian Empire
- Died: December 30, 1966 (aged 77); New York City
- Occupations: Writer; poet; editor; translator

Aaron Glanz-Leyeles (Yiddish: אהרן לעיעלעס-גלאנצז, March 5, 1889 – December 30, 1966) was a Yiddish poet, editor, translator, and journalist, who wrote under several pen names.

== Biography ==
Glanz-Leyeles was born in Włocławek, Russian Empire. His family traced ancestry to 17th century rabbi Yom-Tov Lipmann Heller. They moved to Łódź in 1892, where his father worked at HaMelitz and taught at a Talmud Torah. Glanz-Leyeles attended the school and graduated in 1901, then attending a Russian school. He moved to London in 1905 and studied at the University of London until 1908. While there, he wrote for Der nayer veg and was active in the Zionist Socialist Workers Party. He submitted poetry to Chaim Zhitlowsky's Dos Naye Leben and Abraham Reisen's Dos Naye Land.

He moved to New York City in 1909, and worked for the Jewish Territorial Organization in the United States and Canada. He studied literature at Columbia University from 1910 to 1913, and advocated for Yiddish education in schools. He founded and taught at the first Yiddish school in New York, located on Henry Street. He also founded Yiddish schools in Rochester, New York and Sioux City, Iowa, as well as Toronto and Winnipeg in Canada. He was part of a delegation in 1911 to appeal to Alaska District governor Walter Eli Clark to facilitate Jewish immigration there.

He was a delegate to the 1913 World Zionist Congress in Vienna, and advocated for Jewish migration to the United States. He was director of the Jewish People's and Peretz Schools in Chicago from 1913 to 1914, and helped start schools for The Workers Circle. He wrote for the Fraye Arbeter Shtime in 1914, using the pen name "A. Leyeles". He served as editor of literary, theatre, and political topics for Der Tog, where he attacked communist theory and methods, leading the Soviets to condemn him as a Trotskyist. He taught Yiddish literature at the Sholem Aleichem Folk Institute from 1917 to 1918, and then the Jewish Teachers Seminary. He started the In-Zikh ("Introspectivism") movement with Jacob Glatstein and N. B. Minkoff in 1919. He toured Poland in 1924, giving speeches and lectures.

He translated Edgar Allan Poe's The Raven, Annabel Lee, and Eldorado; as well as Leon Trotsky's History of the Russian Revolution into Yiddish. He helped found the Central Yiddish Cultural Organization (TSIKO) and the American branch of YIVO. He was president of the Yiddish PEN Club and other writer organizations.

He visited Israel for the first time in 1964 to celebrate his 75th birthday, which was attended by many Yiddish writers and the president of Israel Zalman Shazar. He died in New York City on December 30, 1966.

== Analysis ==
Shmuel Niger wrote that Leyeles modernized and urbanized Yiddish poetry with his dramatic and rich forms. Israeli president Zalman Shazar noted Leyeles for being a significant Yiddish playwright, poet, and journalist.

== Works ==
- Labirint (Labyrinth, 1918)
