= Tirtza Atar =

Israeli poet, songwriter, playwright (1941-1977)

- תרצה אתר
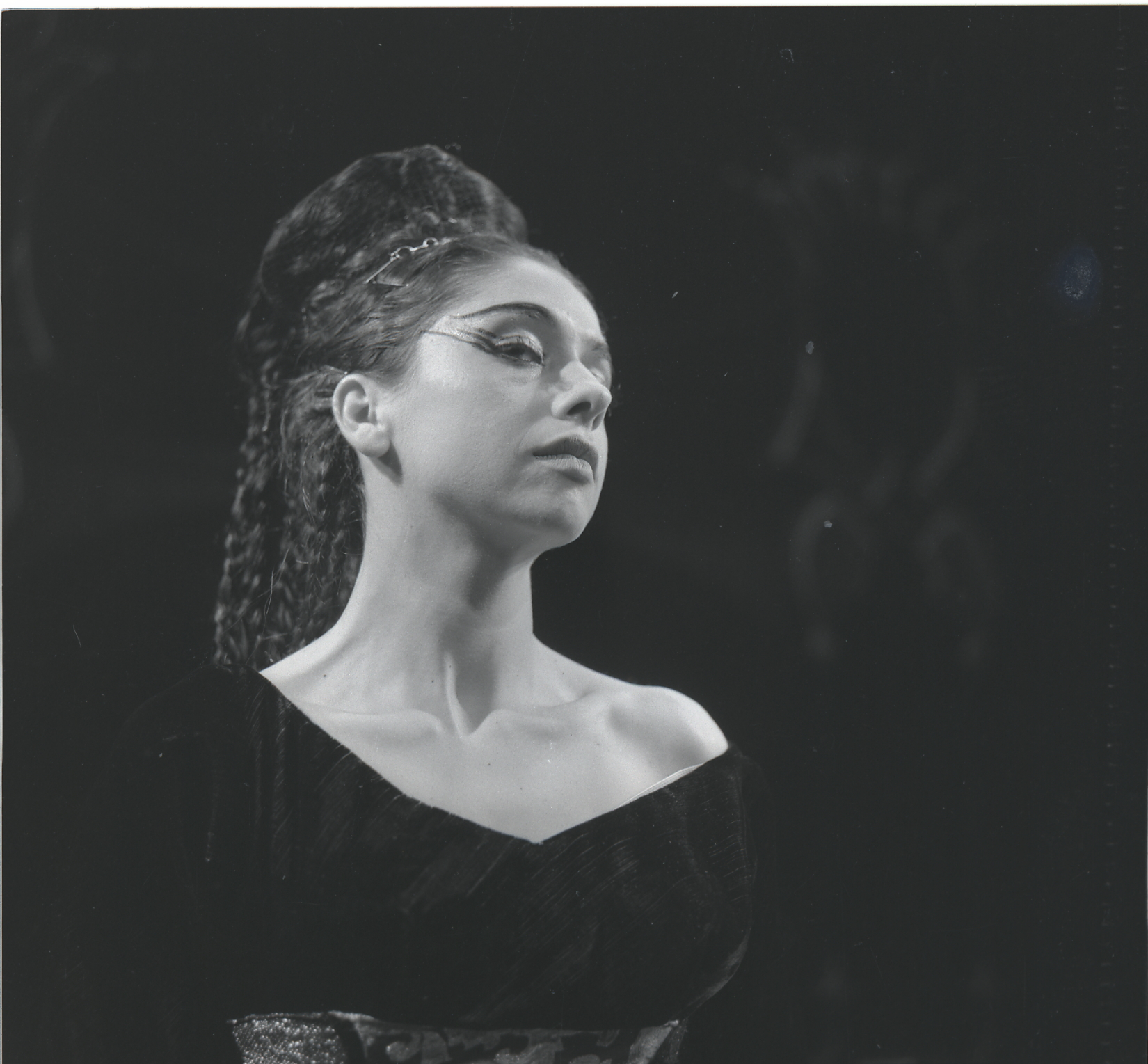
- Tirtza Atar, musical Queen Esther, 1966
- Born: Tirtza Alterman; 27 January 1941; Tel Aviv, Mandatory Palestine
- Died: 8 September 1977 (aged 36); Tel Aviv, Israel
- Occupations: Poet; songwriter; playwright; actress; translator; author
- Parents: Nathan Alterman (father); Rachel Marcus (mother)

Tirtza Atar (Hebrew: תרצה אתר; birth name: Tirtza Alterman; 27 January 1941 – 8 September 1977) was an Israeli lyricist, author, singer, theater actress, playwright, and translator.

Atar was her pen name, an abbreviation of her maiden surname, Alterman.

== Biography ==
Tirza Atar was born in Tel Aviv, the daughter of the renowned poet Nathan Alterman and the theater actress Rachel Marcus. She attended Tel Nordau Elementary School and Ironi D' High School. While in high school, she appeared as an extra in several plays at the Cameri Theatre.

In October 1958, shortly before her 18th birthday, she enlisted in the IDF and served as a singer in the Armored Corps Entertainment Troupe. As a soloist, she famously performed the song "Elipelet," written by her father, in the troupe's 1959 program, Yoter Midai Avak (Too Much Dust).

In 1962, she married Oded Kotler. Following her marriage, she traveled with her husband to New York to study acting.

In New York she experienced several mental health crises, which prompted her father, Nathan Alterman, to fly there to be with her. In his letters from New York to her mother, Alterman described an improvement in her condition, writing that she was in a good and energetic mood and not under stress. Nevertheless, her condition deteriorated again. Following a suspected suicide attempt by gas poisoning in her apartment, her father wrote the poem "Shir Mishmar" ("Guard Song", known by its opening words "Shimri Nafshech", Guard Your Soul) out of concern for her (the song was set to music by Sasha Argov). In response to this, she wrote "Shir HaNishmeret" ("The Guarded Woman's Song", set to music by Naftali Alter), in which she answers each of her father's statements in his poem.

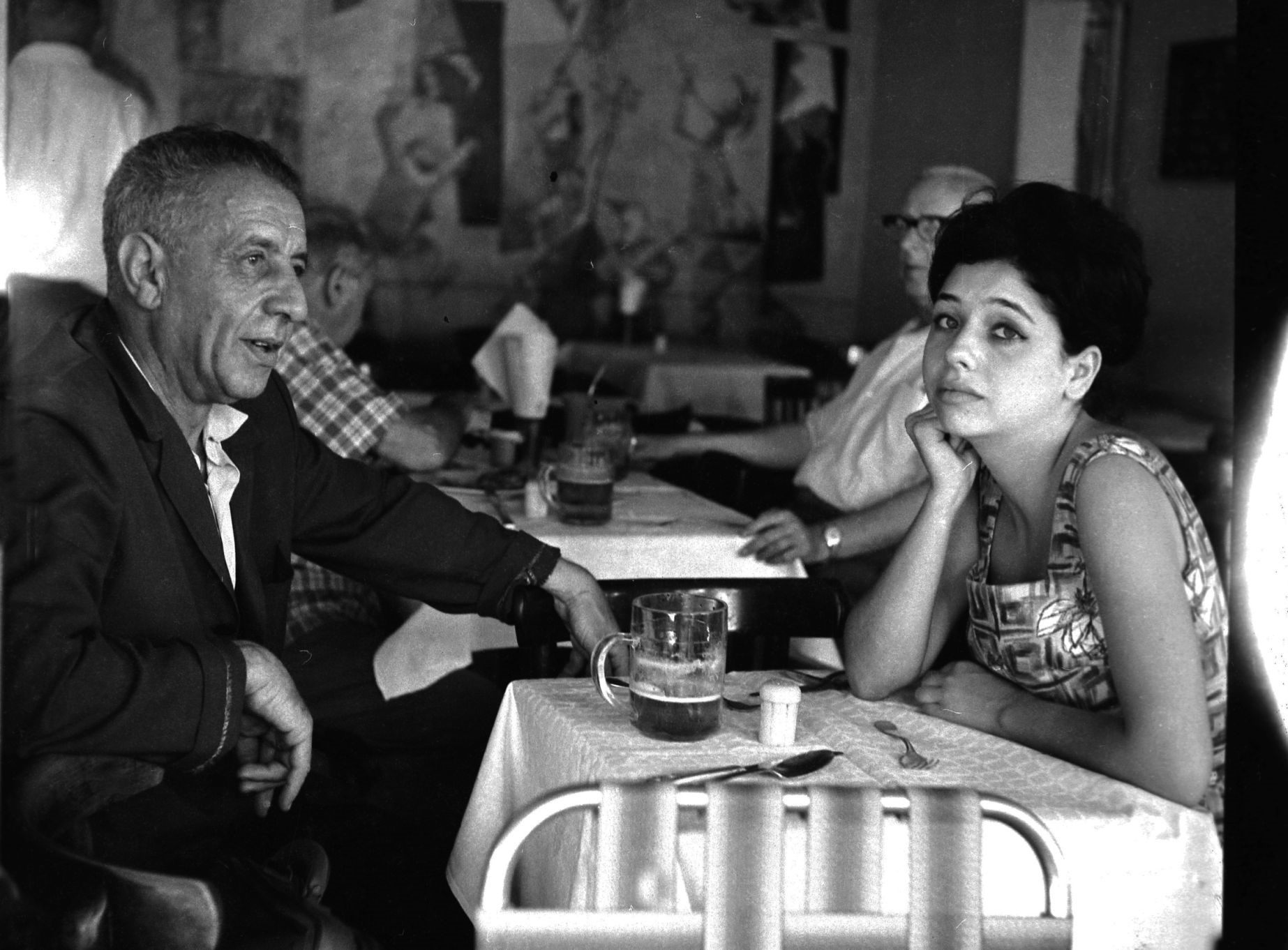
Nathan Alterman with his daughter Tirza Atar at the Café Kassit, 1960.

Less than a year after her arrival to The Big Apple, she returned to Israel with her father.

=== Career in theatre and writing ===
Back in Israel, she appeared in the play No Man's Land by Yehuda Amichai at the Zavit Theatre. She then took a break from the stage, focusing on writing poetry, stories, and a play, as well as translating plays.

In 1964, she was invited to act in the play Three Women in Yellow at the Habima Theatre, but after the play was postponed, she was left without a role. A while later, she was unexpectedly asked to appear at Habima in Miss Julie, despite being a beginner actress.

After several years she left the acting world. Atar explained:

"Success in the theater is not dependent solely on talent. There are other traits required of an actor, and I didn't have them... I didn't belong to the scene. The entire behavior and lifestyle were foreign to my spirit. I like to go to sleep early and wake up early in the morning... I started thinking, why do I need all this? To get bad reviews, to be tired, not to like the scene, and to want to write."

On March 28, 1970, her father passed away. Shortly after, her poem "Pit'om Achshav, Pit'om Hayom" (Suddenly Now, Suddenly Today), with music by Ya'akov Hollaender and performed by Shlomo Artzi, won first place at the 1970 Israel Song Festival.

Atar concentrated on translating plays and writing poetry. By the end of 1970, she had translated about 25 plays. Her poems were sung by prominent artists, including Chava Alberstein and Dorit Reuveni. In 1973, she was commissioned by the producer and singer Benny Amdursky to translate eight folk songs from England and the United States for the joint album Keshet Be'Anan (Rainbow in the Cloud) by The Dudaim and Susan and Fran.

During those years, Atar rarely appeared at public events.

In her short career she translated over 30 plays from English to Hebrew. The complete list of her works may be found at her webpage of The New Hebrew Literature Lexicon.

=== Family and death ===
Atar's marriage to Kotler did not last; Kotler later married Atar's cousin, Ordit, and Atar herself married Binyamin Salor.

From her second marriage, Atar had two children: Yael (Salor) Marzouk (the protagonist of the book Yael Is Traveling) and Nathan Salor (the protagonist of the book Noni, Noni, Ain Kamoni), a creator and singer who later renewed her song "Ballad for My Son Who Grew Up" (music by Sasha Argov).

On September 8, 1977, at the age of 36, Tirza Atar was killed by falling from the sixth-floor window of her home in Tel Aviv. The family claimed it was likely an accident. The day before her death, she was hit by a taxi while crossing the street. Following a night of headaches, a concussion, and sedating medications, her rest was disturbed by construction workers in the adjacent building. She approached the window to ask the workers for quiet, which allegedly caused her to fall. The police investigation determined that, following the difficult night, she may have been struck by dizziness and lost her balance while leaning out the window toward the workers.

The last poem she wrote was "Ballada La'Isha" (Ballad for a Woman). It was written for the play Four Women (an adaptation of Pam Gems' play, which she translated, and which deals with the suicide of one of the characters). The poem included the lines: "Even the books in the closed and sad room / Already knew she was not alright / She is going away for good." She gave the lyrics to the composer Moshe Wilensky. On the morning Wilensky delivered the composed song to Habima, Atar fell from her window and died.

To this day, there is no clear answer as to whether her death was an accident or a suicide. Wilensky suggested that having dealt with depression and a death wish for years, she may have fallen to her death without intending to.

Atar was buried in Kiryat Shaul Cemetery, next to her father.

== Awards ==
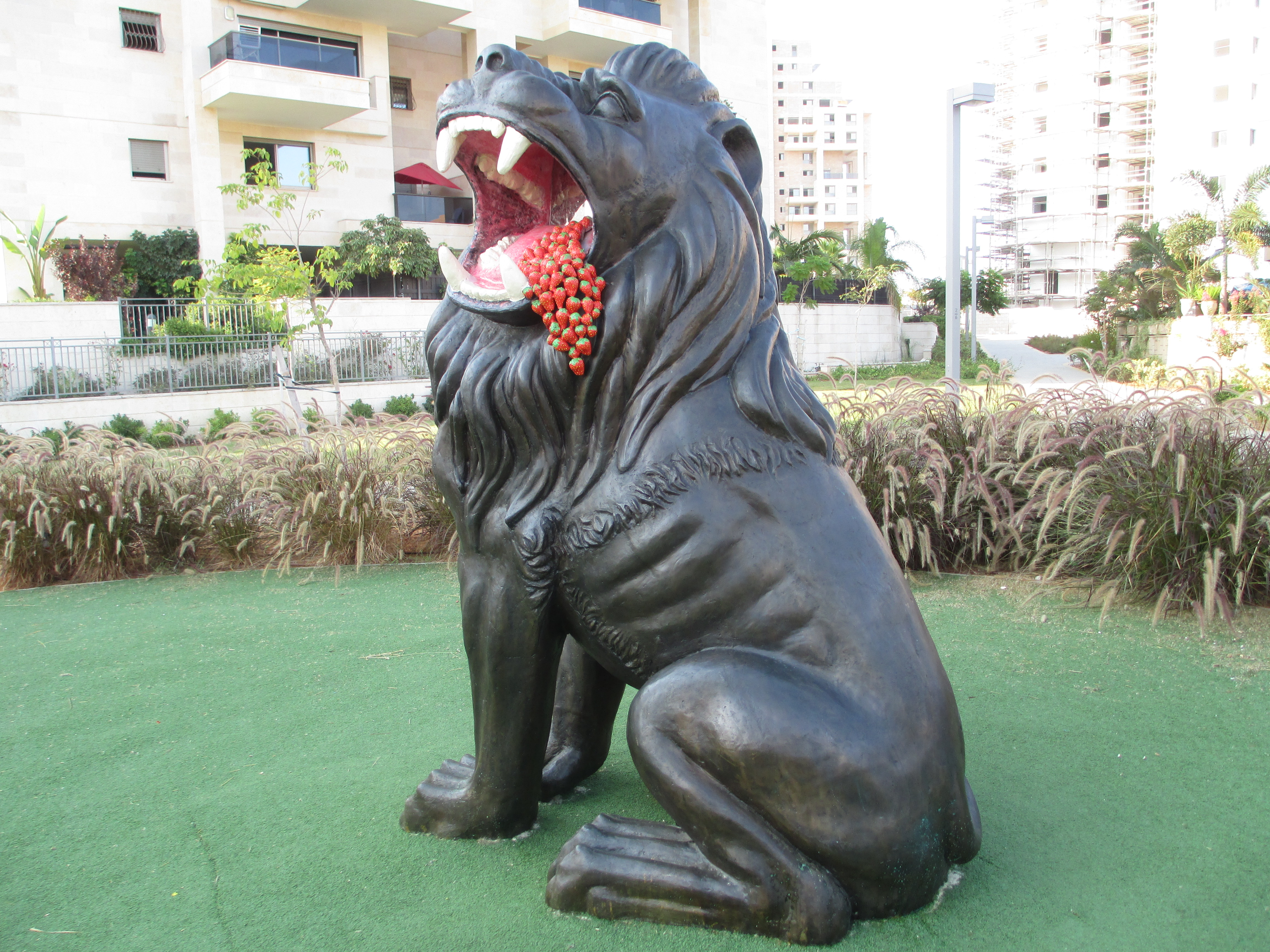
The Lion Who Loved Strawberries, Holon, by Asaf Lifshitz

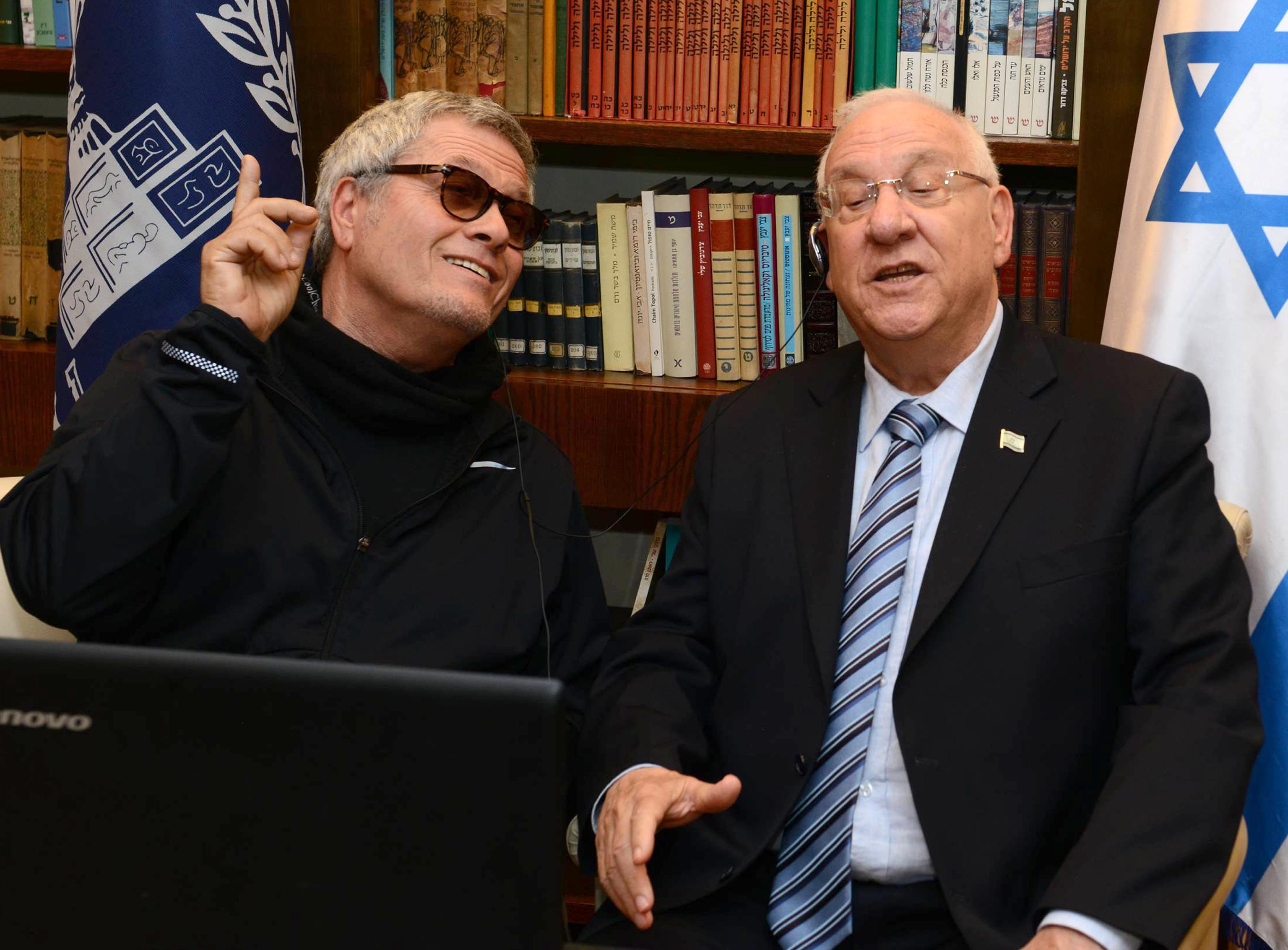
Shlomo Artzi and former Israeli President Reuven Rivlin singing "Suddenly Now, Suddenly Today"

=== Prize winners ===
- Her children's book Ya'el Takes a Walk, which Atar wrote for her daughter Ya'el ("יעל מטיילת", 1971) received the 1973 Ze'ev Prize for children's and youth literature. A story from the book, The Lion Who Loved Strawberries (Ha'aryeh she'ahav tot), was republished in 2003 and was a national bestseller for 116 weeks.
- "Pit'om Achshav, Pit'om HaYom" Suddenly Now, Suddenly Today, performed by Shlomo Artzi, was the winner of the Israel Song Festival, 1970.
- In 1970 her song "Ani Cholem al Naomi" (I Dream of Naomi) sung by the duo Hedva and David won the first place at the Yamaha Song Festival Tokyo, Japan. Its Japanese version ナオミの夢 "Naomi no Yume" was sold between one and three million copies, becoming the gold record. It was placed second on the 1971 Israeli Annual Hebrew Song Chart.

== About her life and work ==
- In 2015 Ari Davidovich produced a documentary תרצה אתר: ציפור בחדר, which won the jury award at the 2015 Haifa International Film Festival.
- Gundula Schiffer, Tirza Atar: Wenn alles berührt. Eine Biografie der Dichterin in Essays und Übersetzungen, Edition Karo, Berlin 2019, ISBN 978-3-945961-09-4

== See also ==
- Category:Songs written by Tirza Atar at Hebrew Wikipedia
