= N. B. Minkoff =

American poet

Nahum Baruch Minkoff (November 18, 1893 – March 14, 1958) was a Polish-born Jewish American Yiddish poet, newspaper editor, and educator.

== Life ==
Minkoff was born on November 18, 1893, in Warsaw, Poland. His father Moyshe was a Hebrew teacher from Krasnaluki, Minsk Governorate who studied in Moscow, and his mother Elka came from a family of scholars and maskilim from Shilets, Mogilev Governorate.

Minkoff studied Hebrew with private tutors and received a general education in Ptashnik's school and Muravliev's business school in Warsaw. In 1906, he entered a Russian state high school. He passed his baccalaureate examinations in 1914. He also studied music. In 1914, following the outbreak of World War I, he immigrated to America. He initially settled in San Francisco with his sister and considered a career in medicine, only to move to New York City with the sister shortly afterwards. He initially studied in Columbia University and City College, and in 1917 he entered New York University School of Law. He supported himself during that time with music lessons and playing the violin in an orchestra. He graduated from New York University in 1921, although he never practiced law. He began studying Yiddish, which was virtually a foreign language to him before coming to America, and in 1921 he became a Yiddish teacher in Philadelphia. In 1922, he was a teacher in a New York City school. He also gave music lessons for Jewish schools in Harlem and West New York and worked as a Yiddish and Jewish history teacher for the Workmen's Circle's Middle School in New York.

Minkoff published his first Yiddish poem in the Neie Velt in 1918. His poems and essays appeared in numerous periodicals since then, including Yiddishe Folk, Fraye Arbeter Shtime, Der Tog, Undzer Buch, Kern, Bodn, Kempfer, and Tzunkunft. In 1920, he was an editor of the In Sich anthology and In Sich magazines. He was also co-editor, publisher and writer for the magazines 1925 and 1926 with Michel Licht and co-editor of Bodn. He issued the first manifesto of the In-Zikh group, which emphasized modernism, cosmopolitanism, and individualism, with Jacob Glatstein and Aaron Glanz-Leyeles. Leyeles was his mentor in Yiddish poetry, and Glatstein was his classmate at New York University. His poetry was described by one source as intellectualized emotion, and as a trained musician he experimented with subtle rhythms of free verse. His first volume of Yiddish poetry, Lieder (Songs), was published in 1924. This was followed by Beim Rand (At the Edge) in 1945, which was written following the devastation of the Holocaust. He also wrote a study on the sixteenth century Yiddish minstrel Eliahu Bocker in 1950 and on Glückel of Hameln in 1952. He published several books of essays on Yiddish poetry, including Yiddish Classical Poets in 1937, Six Yiddish Critics in 1954, and the three-volume series Pioneers of Yiddish Poetry in America in 1956.

Minkoff became managing editor of Zukunft in 1941. He was a contributing editor of the Algemeine Yidishe Entisklopedie and the Universal Jewish Encyclopedia. He became a faculty member of the Jewish Teachers Seminary in 1941, a lecturer in Yiddish literature for the New School for Social Research in 1946, and professor of Yiddish language and literature for the Academy for Higher Jewish Learning in 1952. He also became professor of Yiddish literature in the Philosophy Department of the Autonomous State University in Mexico City in the latter year to great success. He gave lectures in English. He was an initiator and co-founder of the Jewish Arts Center for the 1949 World Jewish Culture Congress in New York.

Minkoff married Hasye Cooperman in 1932 in Greenwich, Connecticut. Hasye was a Yiddish writer in her own right who worked with her husband over the course of his life and wrote and published a detailed biography of his life following his death. They had two sons, Amram and Eli.

Minkoff died at home from a heart attack on March 14, 1958. He was buried in the Workmen's Circle section of Mount Carmel Cemetery.
