= Israel Song Festival =

Israeli annual music competition

Israel Song Festival Festival HaZemer VeHaPizmon פסטיבל הזמר והפזמון
- Genre: Pop music, etc.
- Location: Israel
- Years active: 1960–1980
- Founders: Israel Broadcasting Authority

Israel Song Festival (Hebrew: פסטיבל הזמר והפזמון, romanized: Festival HaZemer VeHaPizmon, lit. 'Singer and chorus festival') was an annual music competition organized by the Israel Broadcasting Authority. In its final years, it served as the national final to select Israel's entry for the Eurovision Song Contest.

== History ==
The idea for the competition came from Kol Yisrael producer Israel Daliyot after seeing people celebrating Domenico Modugno's victory in the Sanremo Music Festival 1959 while on vacation in Rome. Daliyot approached the Israel Broadcasting Authority, and with the involvement of the Prime Minister's Office, the first festival was held as part of the 1960 Independence Day celebrations.

The festival became an annual fixture in the Independence Day celebration over the following years, although it was not held in 1962, 1962 and 1968, when it was replaced by other variety shows. In 1975, the festival was cancelled by then IBA director-general Yitzhak Livni, as he considered the festival's songs to be of low quality, and was replaced by another singing festival that didn't air to television. In 1976, there was another replacement called "The Singing Celebration", which worked differently; there was no competition, and the participants performed two songs each, one previously released song and one new song. The festival was reinstated in 1977, and by the following year it was designated as the national preselection for the Eurovision Song Contest, and until the festival was cancelled, in 1981, the competition was held between January and March.

After the 1980 edition, the competition was replaced by Kdam Eurovision as the national final for Eurovision. Attempts were made to reinstate the competition, first in 1987, as part of the Arad Hebrew Music Festival, with three further attempts in 2000–2001, 2005–2006 and 2013.

== Format ==
Between 1960 and 1966, each song was performed twice, once by a male singer and once by a female singer, in order to give emphasis on the song itself rather the performer. In 1967, the format was changed so each song was performed once. Following the main competition, an intermission was held during which the viewers could vote for their favorite song, while an interval act was performed. In 1969, votes from five ballots around Israel were added to the total of votes.

== Winners ==
| Year | Song | Artist | Lyricist | Composer |
|---|---|---|---|---|
| 1960 | "Erev Ba" (ערב בא) | Aliza Kashi, Shimon Bar | Oded Avisar | Arie Levanon |
| 1961 | "Saeni Imcha" (שאני עמך) | Esther Ofarim, Gideon Singer | Pnina Avni | Zvi Avni |
| 1964 | "Yaldati Imri" (ילדתי אמרי) | Benny Amdursky & Nechama Hendel, Rinat Choir | Moshe Dor | Ya'akov Hollaender |
| 1965 | "Ayelet HaChen" (איילת החן) | Arik Einstein, Yafa Yarkoni | Oded Betzer | Nathan Shachar |
| 1966 | "Leil Stav" (ליל סתיו) | Arik Einstein, Yafa Yarkoni | Haya Cohen | Haim Tzur |
| 1967 | "Mi Yode'a Kama" (מי יודע כמה) | Mike Burstyn | Rimona Di-Nur | Ya'akov Hollander |
| 1969 | "Balada LaChovesh" (בלדה לחובש) | Yehoram Gaon | Dan Almagor | Shimon Cohen |
| 1970 | "Pit'om Achshav, Pit'om HaYom" (פתאום עכשיו, פתאום היום) | Shlomo Artzi | Tirza Atar | Ya'akov Hollander |
| 1971 | "Rak HaYare'ach" (רק הירח) | Ilanit | Shimrit Orr | Dan Amihud |
| 1972 | "Tov Li LaShir" (טוב לי לשיר) | HaTov, HaRa VeHana'ara | Ehud Manor | Shmulik Kraus |
| 1973 | "At VeAni Noladnu BeTashach" (את ואני נולדנו בתש"ח) | Edna Lev | Moti Giladi | Yigal Bashan |
| 1974 | "HaBalada Al Baruch Jamili" (הבלדה על ברוך ג'מילי) | Shlomo Artzi and Mrs. Apple Group | Shlomo Artzi | Gidi Koren |
| 1977 | "Rakefet" (רקפת) | Ruhama Raz | Talma Alyagon-Rose | Moni Amarillo |
| 1978 | "A-Ba-Ni-Bi" (אבניבי) | Izhar Cohen and Alphabeta | Ehud Manor | Nurit Hirsh |
| 1979 | "Hallelujah" (הללויה) | Milk and Honey | Shimrit Orr | Kobi Oshrat |
| 1980 | "Pizmon Hozer" (פזמון חוזר) | The Brothers & the Sisters | Gidi Koren | Gidi Koren |
| 1987 | "Yona Im Aleh Shel Za'it" (יונה עם עלה של זית) | Southern Command Entertainment Group | Talma Alyagon-Rose | Talma Alyagon-Rose |
| 2000 | "Tfilat HaOr" (תפילת האור) | Aki Avni & Haya Samir | Nurit Bat Shachar-Tzafrir | Yoshi Sade |
| 2001 | "Rikud HaChayim" (ריקוד החיים) | Keren Shani | Avner Eshkol | Itzhak Eliezrov |
| 2005 | "Mishehu Gadol" (מישהו גדול) | Shay Gabso | Hana Goldberg | Dudi Levi |
| 2006 | "Im At BaInyan" (אם את בעניין) | Malta Baya | Assaf Shalem | Yair Eldar |
| 2013 | "Tachzeri" (תחזרי) | Pe'er Tasi | Pe'er Tasi | Dudu Matana |

== Presenters ==
| Years | Presenter(s) |
|---|---|
| 1960–1971 | Yitzhak Shimoni |
| 1972 | Yossi Banai and Rivka Michaeli |
| 1973–1980 | Rivka Michaeli |
| 1987 | Daniel Pe'er |
| 2000 | Moni Moshonov and Miki Kam |
| 2001 | Moni Moshonov and Yael Abecassis |
| 2005 | Erez Tal and Adi Ashkenazi |
| 2006 | Rivka Michaeli and Alma Zack |
| 2013 | Uri Gottlieb |
