= Hedva and David =

Israeli vocal duo

Hedva and David was an Israeli singing duo, comprising Hedva Amrani and David Tal (born David Rosenthal). In 1970, the duo won first place at the Yamaha Song Festival in Tokyo, Japan, with the song "I Dream of Naomi" (אני חולם על נעמי "Ani Cholem Al Naomi"), lyrics: Tirtza Atar, music: David Krivoshei. The song sold more than a million copies in its Japanese version (lyrics by Kazuko Katagiri), ナオミの夢 "Naomi no Yume." It was awarded a gold disc.

Amrani recorded her first hit song in 1962 while serving in the Israel Defense Forces. In 1965, Amrani and Tal cut their first album, Tzemed Zimrei Am, which included 12 folk songs in different languages.

In the late 1970s, Amrani launched a solo career. Amrani is married to Dudley Danoff and lives in Beverly Hills, California, United States.

== See also ==
- Best-selling international singles in Japan
