= Nathan Alterman =

Russian and Israeli writer, journalist and translator

- נתן אלתרמן
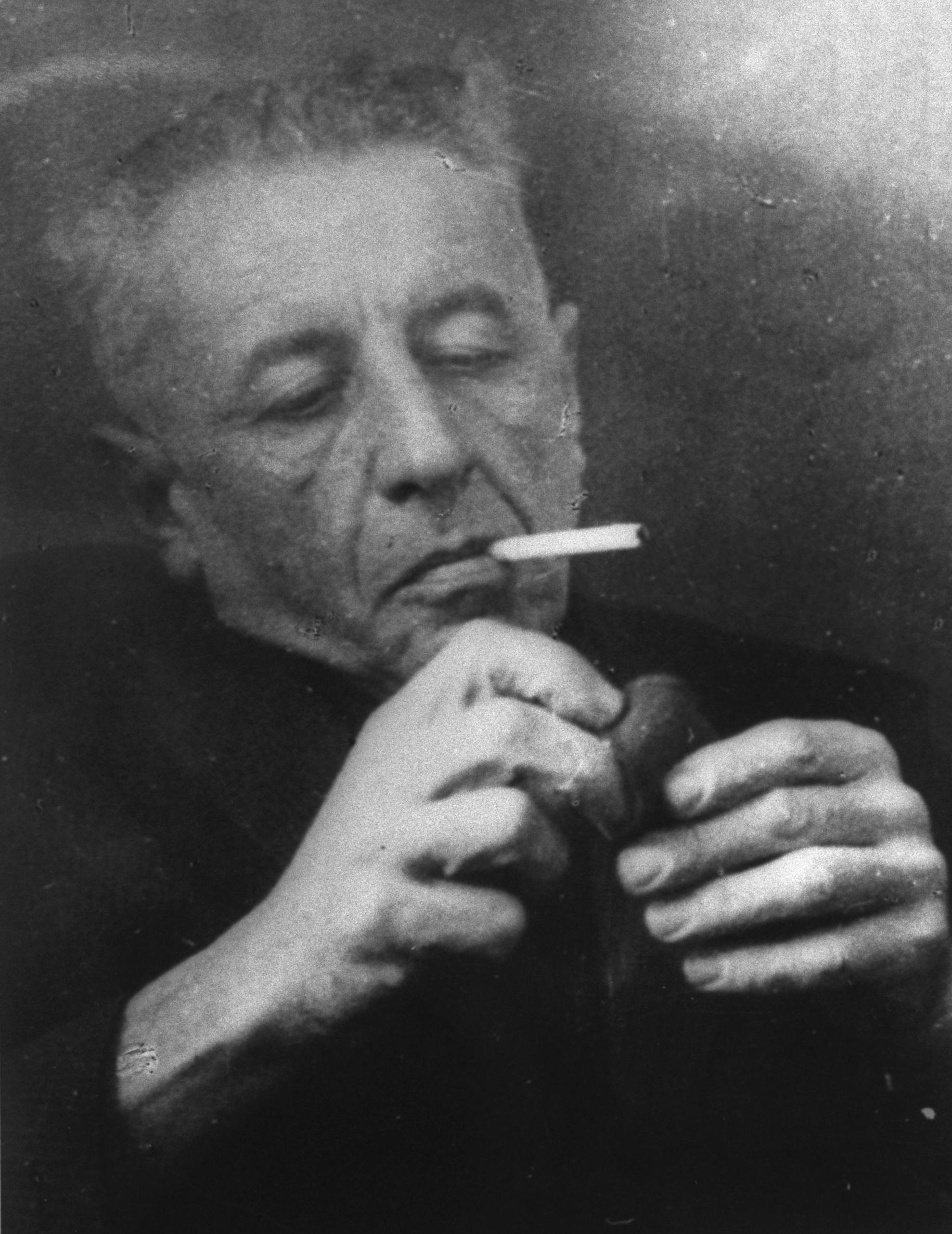
- Alterman in 1952
- Born: August 14, 1910; Warsaw, Congress Poland, Russian Empire
- Died: March 28, 1970 (aged 59); Tel Aviv, Israel
- Occupations: Poet, translator, playwright, journalist
- Spouse: Rachel Marcus Tzila Binder
- Children: Tirtza Atar
- Writing career
- Language: Russian, Hebrew, German, French, English, Polish
- Movement: Yakhdav (led by Avraham Shlonsky)

Nathan Alterman (Hebrew: נתן אלתרמן; August 14, 1910 – March 28, 1970) was a key figure in the Labor Zionist movement, though he held complex views on party leadership. His poetry is recognized for its sophisticated use of symbolic structure. He played a significant role in shaping public discourse, although he never held elected office.

== Biography ==
=== Early life and education ===
Nathan Alterman was born in Warsaw on August 14, 1910, when the city formed part of Congress Poland within the Russian Empire. Both of his parents were teachers; his father, Yitzhak, helped found Hebrew-language kindergarten education in Warsaw, and Alterman was given a Hebrew education from early childhood. The family left Warsaw at the outbreak of World War I and lived in Moscow and then Kishinev before settling in Tel Aviv in 1925, when Alterman was fifteen.

In Tel Aviv he attended the Herzliya Hebrew Gymnasium. He left for France in 1929, spending a year at the University of Paris and two further years at an agricultural college near Nancy, and qualified as an agricultural engineer in 1932; his first poem had appeared in print the year before. The French period was short but formative, and traces of it recur in the essays and sketches he published on his return, in which he registered his distance both from the Jews of France and from the imperial display of the International Colonial Exhibition, and dwelt on the position of the Jewish student among strangers and among his own.

Back in Tel Aviv from 1932, Alterman worked briefly at the Mikveh Israel agricultural school before turning to writing full time. He is credited with introducing the marmande tomato to the country, where it remained a widely grown variety into the 1960s.

His decisive literary attachment in these years was to Avraham Shlonsky, a decade his senior, who had campaigned since the mid-1920s against the didactic and biblically inflected rhetoric of the preceding generation, a stance that set him against Hayim Nahman Bialik and the Hebrew literary establishment. When Shlonsky left the magazine Ketuvim in 1933 to found Turim ("Columns"), Alterman and Leah Goldberg followed him. Shlonsky's pacifism, set out in his 1932 tract Lo Tirtzah ("Thou Shalt Not Kill"), also left its mark: Alterman's 1934 poem "Do Not Give Them Arms", prompted by a newspaper report of the death of a French veteran gassed during the First World War, was set to music by the émigré composer Stefan Wolpe and became a widely sung anti-war anthem.

Alterman married the actress Rachel Marcus, later of the Cameri Theatre company; their daughter, the poet, lyricist and translator Tirtza Atar, was born in Tel Aviv in 1941.

== Literary career ==
=== Beginnings, 1933–1943 ===
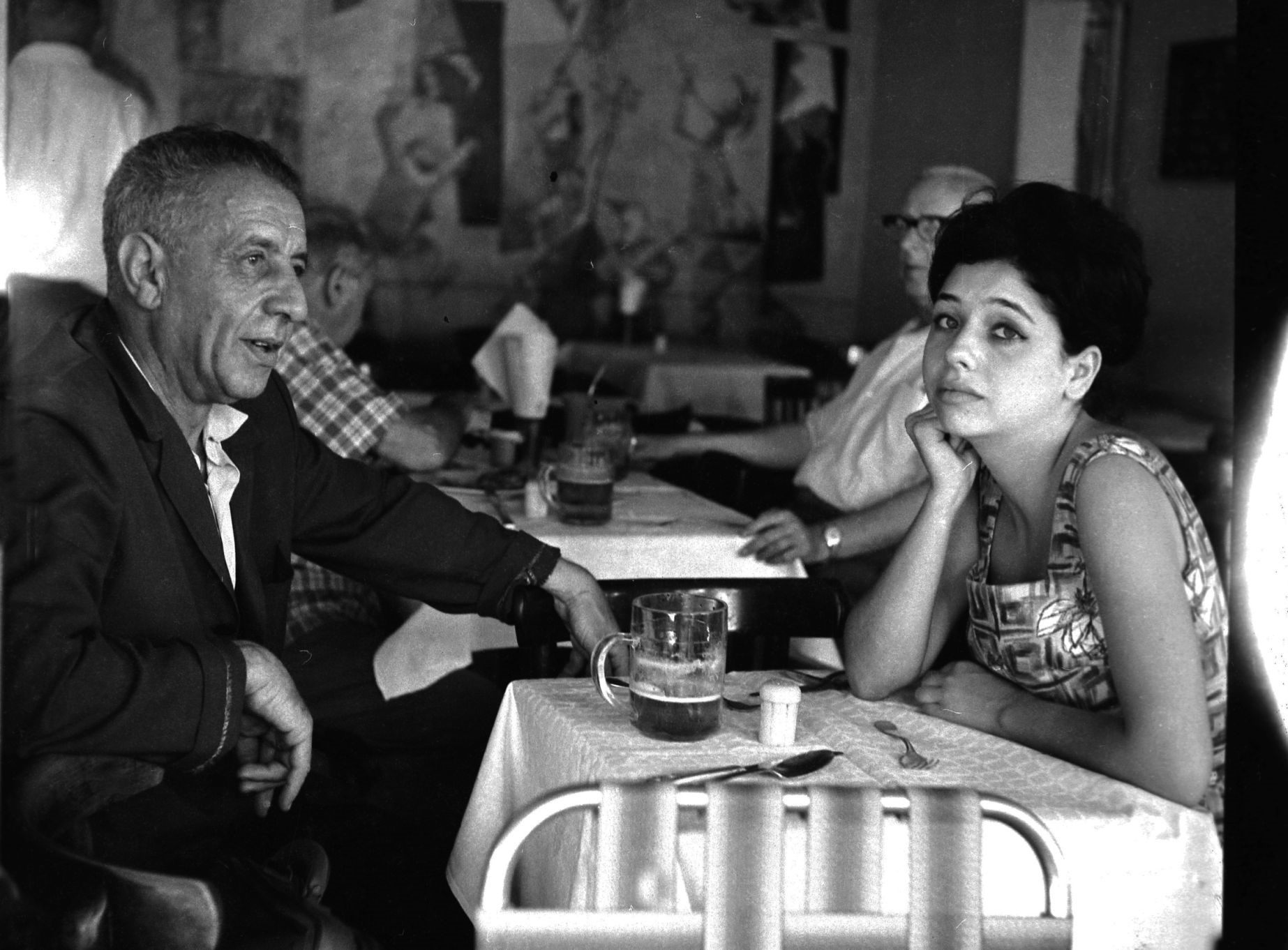
Alterman with his daughter Tirtza Atar

Alterman began writing for the stage soon after abandoning agronomy, supplying songs from 1933 to the Tel Aviv vaudeville theatre The Broom (Hebrew: המטאטא). Apart from his translations of European plays, most of his early theatrical work consisted of light musicals and cabaret sketches, a number of which made affectionate fun of the accents and manners of the recently arrived Yekke immigrants from Germany.

In 1934 he began a rhymed newspaper column, Tel Aviv Sketches (Hebrew: סקיצות תל אביביות), in Davar; twenty six instalments appeared over four months. That November he moved to Haaretz, where a similar but more satirical column, Moments (Hebrew: רגעים), ran until January 1943 and yielded close to three hundred rhymed sketches and commentaries. Much of this early journalism was private rather than public in character: Alterman wrote as a Tel Aviv flâneur, personifying the city's streets and buildings, and turned a sceptical eye on cinema, photography and political rhetoric alike. The literary scholar Nissim Kalderon has described the years between 1934 and the outbreak of the Second World War as governed by a wish to insulate the poet's inner world from historical and political events, with the turn to explicitly political writing coming only afterwards.

The war brought that turn about. On November 27, 1942, four days after the Jewish Agency publicly confirmed the systematic murder of European Jewry, Alterman published "Of All the Peoples" (Hebrew: מכל העמים) in Haaretz. Addressed to God, the poem inverts the liturgical formula of Jewish chosenness into an accusation.

=== Poetry ===
Alterman's first collection, Kokhavim ba-Ḥuts (Hebrew: כוכבים בחוץ, "Stars Outside"), appeared in 1938 and established him as a major figure in modern Hebrew literature. Formed by the symbolist currents of French and Russian poetry and by the modernist circle around Shlonsky, he became the leading imagist poet of his generation; his idiom followed the rhythms of spoken Hebrew, and his verse constructed a private mythology poised between a primeval, elemental landscape and a mechanised, decadent and alluring city.

The Joy of the Poor (Hebrew: שמחת עניים, Simḥat Aniyim, 1941) is a cycle of interlinked poems spoken by a dead man preoccupied with the living woman he loves. Alongside Stars Outside it became, in Tsur Ehrlich's phrase, a kind of secular scripture for many Israeli readers, and it draws unusually heavily on Jewish liturgy: its penultimate poem, set in a besieged town about to fall, echoes the climactic moments of the Yom Kippur service.

Shirei Makkot Mitsrayim (Hebrew: שירי מכות מצרים, "Poems of the Plagues of Egypt", 1944) applies the biblical plague narrative to a cyclical reading of history, extended beyond the Jewish people to humanity at large. Later collections continued in this vein: City of the Dove (Hebrew: עיר היונה, 1957), which takes the founding of the state as its subject, and the narrative cycle Summer Celebration (Hebrew: חגיגת קיץ, 1965).

=== The Seventh Column ===
In 1943 Alterman left Haaretz for the Histadrut daily Davar. His weekly column there, Ha-Tur ha-Shevi'i (Hebrew: הטור השביעי, "The Seventh Column"), appeared on Fridays and ran until 1967. Written largely in verse, it attacked the British administration and chronicled the campaign of the Haganah and the Palmach against restrictions on Jewish immigration. Over almost a quarter of a century the column produced a poetic persona combining prophet, public moralist and political commentator, and it was this body of journalistic verse that gave Alterman an influence without precedent among Hebrew writers and the informal standing of national poet. Between 1945 and 1947 the column supported Aliyah Bet and denounced British policy, notably in the 1945 piece In Praise of an Italian Captain (Hebrew: נאום תשובה לרב חובל איטלקי).

The best known of these poems is The Silver Platter (Hebrew: מגש הכסף, Magash ha-Kesef), published in Davar in December 1947, weeks after fighting broke out following the United Nations partition vote. Prompted by Chaim Weizmann's remark that a Jewish state would not be handed to the Jewish people on a silver platter, it describes a young man and woman who approach a waiting nation and identify themselves as the platter on which the state has been delivered. The poem was canonised almost at once and has since become a fixture of Israeli Memorial Day ceremonies.

Alterman also used the column against the conduct of Israeli forces. On November 19, 1948 he published Al Zot (Hebrew: על זאת, "About This"), which condemned the euphemisms used to describe killings of civilians and called for the soldiers responsible to be prosecuted. The poem did not name the incident it addressed; critics have variously linked it to the capture of Lydda and to the Al-Dawayima massacre of the previous month. Following its publication and an exchange of letters with David Ben-Gurion, it was reportedly reprinted and distributed among Israeli soldiers.

=== Theatre, translation and song ===
Alterman worked as a translator throughout his career, rendering Shakespeare, Racine and Molière into Hebrew; the Tchernichovsky Prize he received in 1946 and again in 1967 recognised this work. An early translation, of R. C. Sherriff's anti war play Journey's End, was staged in October 1934 by the New Theatre with a cast of recently arrived German-Jewish actors; the text has not survived.

In 1942 he adapted Sammy Gronemann's comedy Der Weise und der Narr for the Hebrew stage as King Solomon and Shalmai the Cobbler. First staged at the Ohel theatre in 1943 and revived as a Cameri Theatre musical in 1964, it became one of the most successful productions in the history of Israeli theatre. In 1943 he also wrote the maqama The Swedish Tongue, praising Sweden's reception of Jewish refugees from Denmark.

Many of Alterman's poems were set to music and entered the popular Israeli songbook, among them "Song of the Valley" (Hebrew: שיר העמק), a pioneer's lullaby typical of the Land of Israel genre of the 1930s and 1940s.

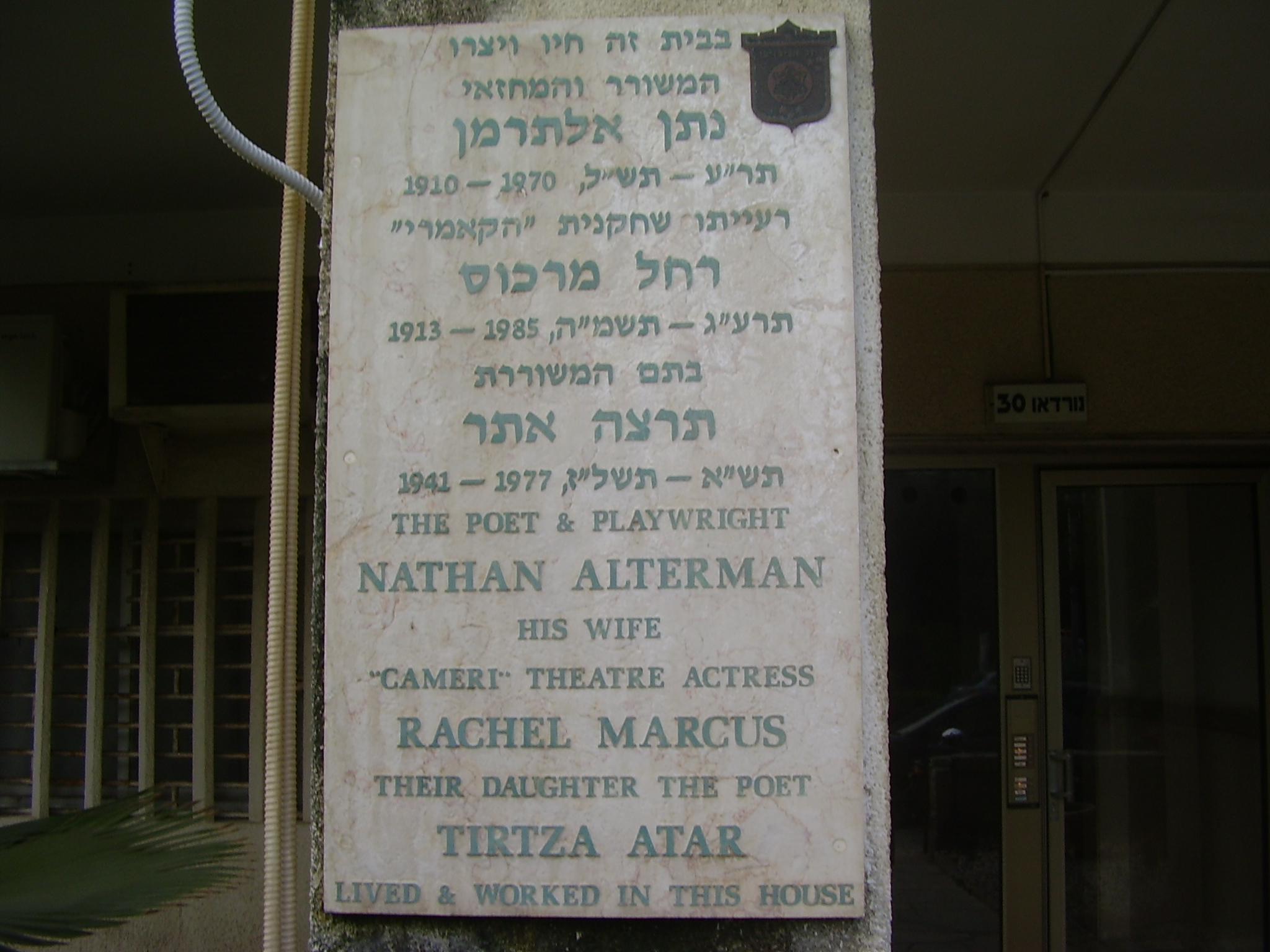
memorial plate to the poet Nathan Alterman and his family in Tel Aviv

== Political activism ==
Alterman's politics were inseparable from his newspaper column, and his relationship to power has been read in sharply different ways. Dan Miron argued that from the 1940s onward Alterman was the clearest emblem of a literature aligned with the ruling party, a claim that provoked a lasting controversy and drew alternative readings from Dan Laor and Ziva Shamir. Arie Dubnov has suggested that a factor no less important in Alterman's canonisation was the opposite tendency: his readiness to criticise Israeli politicians and to spend his privileged standing on positions he considered morally right.

Through the 1950s Alterman repeatedly attacked the state's treatment of its Arab citizens, likening their position to that of persecuted Jewish communities in the diaspora, and rebuked members of the Knesset over the eviction of Arab infiltrators who had crossed back into Israel. After the Kafr Qasim massacre of October 1956, in which Israeli border police killed dozens of Arab civilians during a curfew, he wrote against calls for leniency towards the men responsible, noting that the plea of obedience to orders had been used to justify crimes committed against the Jews themselves. He also opposed the policy of selective immigration, under which elderly and infirm North African Jews were refused entry, and the "melting pot" approach to absorbing new immigrants; the scholar Ruth Kartun-Blum has described him as the only writer of the period to condemn selective immigration.

Unlike many in his literary circle, Alterman was a persistent critic of the Soviet Union and of Israeli writers who defended or excused it. In 1953 he devoted two columns to an exchange with the Mapam leader Mordechai Bentov over the Doctors' plot. He supported the 1952 sailors' strike, which was suppressed by the government of David Ben-Gurion. In 1961 he praised the Israeli government for condemning apartheid in South Africa, describing the move as consistent with the purpose of a Jewish state.

The Six-Day War of 1967 marked a decisive turn. Five days after the fighting ended Alterman published an article in Maariv arguing that Israel now faced a reality without precedent, and in the months that followed he became one of the founders, and the leading literary voice, of the Movement for Greater Israel, which called on the government to retain the captured territories and to settle them. He had been recruited to it by the writer Moshe Shamir. Alterman's case for retaining the territories rested less on security than on what he regarded as historical and moral right: as he put it, security measures have substitutes but justice does not.

Within the movement, however, his position was among the more moderate. Omer Einav places Alterman, alongside Yuval Ne'eman and Meir Bareli, in its humanistic wing, arguing that Israel was obliged to resettle and rehabilitate the Palestinian refugees under its control regardless of whether Arab states agreed to negotiations. His insistence on mass Jewish immigration, which he considered the precondition for holding the territories at all, was likewise central to the movement's programme. Alterman died in 1970; the movement contested the 1969 election unsuccessfully and joined the Likud alliance before the 1973 election.

In his final years Alterman also registered disappointment with the state he had championed. Writing in Maariv against the background of the famine in Biafra, he criticised the Israeli government's hesitant response as a missed opportunity to act on what he took to be Israel's purpose among the nations.

== Awards ==
Alterman twice received the Tchernichovsky Prize, awarded by the Tel Aviv municipality for exemplary translation. He was given it for the first time on October 13, 1946, at a ceremony held on the anniversary of Tchernichovsky's death, in recognition of his Hebrew versions of Racine's Phèdre and Shakespeare's The Merry Wives of Windsor; Avraham Shlonsky took the first prize the same year. A second Tchernichovsky Prize followed in 1967.

He also received the Ruppin Prize in 1947, the Bialik Prize for literature in 1957, and the Israel Prize for literature in 1968.

== Death ==
Alterman fell ill with an intestinal complaint early in 1970. On March 16 he was taken to Ichilov Hospital with severe abdominal pain and underwent surgery the following day. During the operation he suffered a heart attack and lost consciousness; he never regained it, and died on March 28, 1970, at the age of 59.

Alterman had asked in his will not to be eulogised. He was buried on March 30 at Kiryat Shaul Cemetery in Tel Aviv rather than in the writers' section of Trumpeldor Cemetery, in keeping with his wish to be laid to rest as an ordinary man; the ceremony was conducted by soldiers, apparently at the instance of Moshe Dayan.

For a month afterwards Alterman's name filled the Israeli press. Senior political and military figures delivered eulogies, critical assessments of his work appeared in the major papers, and leading Israeli poets wrote poems in his memory.

== Legacy ==
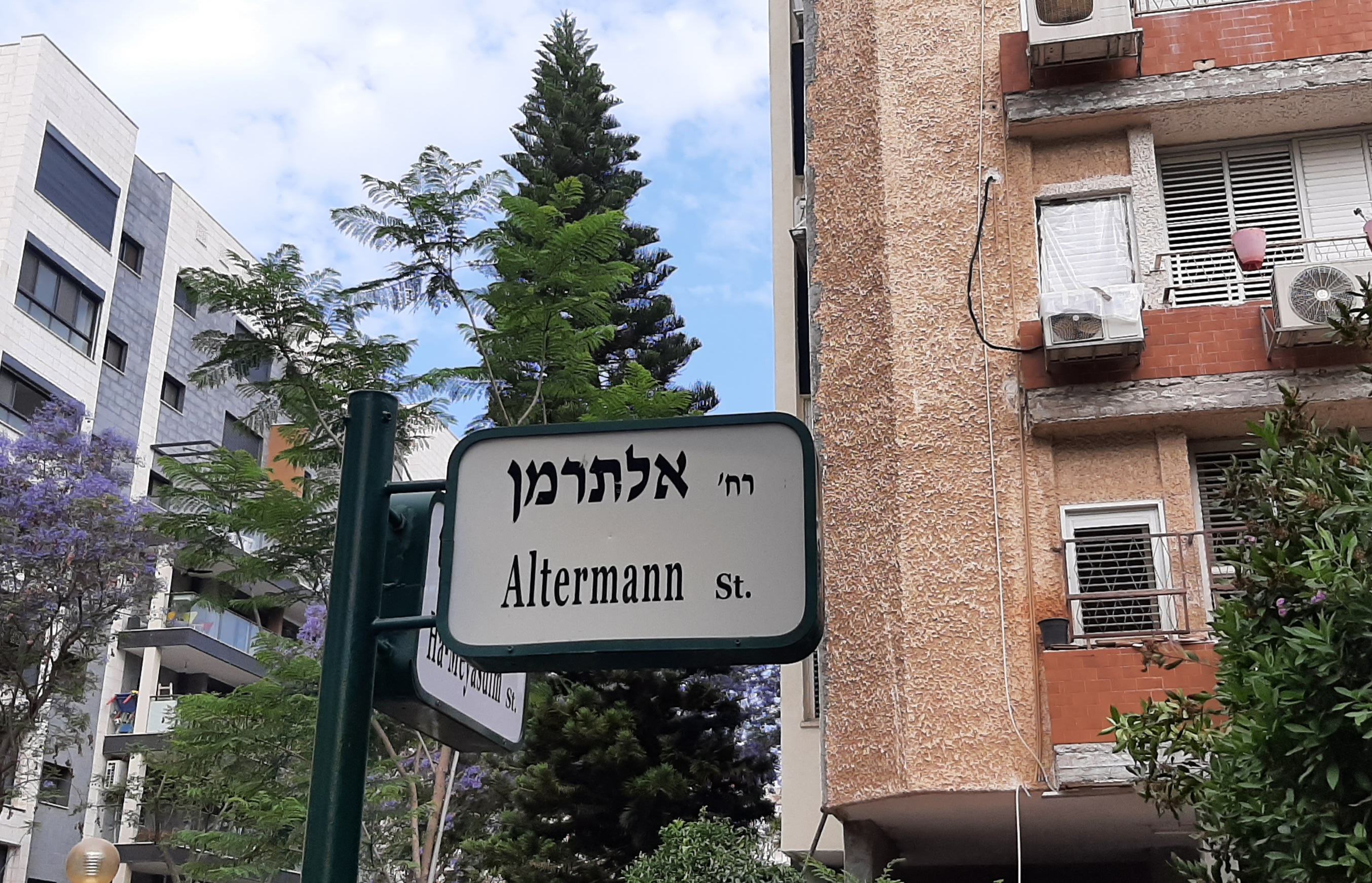
Alterman Street, Kfar Saba

Soon after Alterman's death the literary editor Menachem Dorman founded the Alterman Institute, which administers the poet's estate, and began issuing his collected writings, The Seventh Column among them. In the 2010s the classicist Dwora Gilula prepared a revised and annotated edition of the column, correcting errors and omissions and restoring the pieces to chronological rather than thematic order. Published in six volumes between 2010 and 2017, it gathers some seven hundred columns together with the Moments sketches, which earlier editions had left out.

Following Alterman's death, Kibbutz HaMeuchad Publishing House embarked on a comprehensive editorial project to collect and publish his complete works, a task that took over three decades (1971–2005) under the direction of Menachem Dorman.

=== Commemoration ===
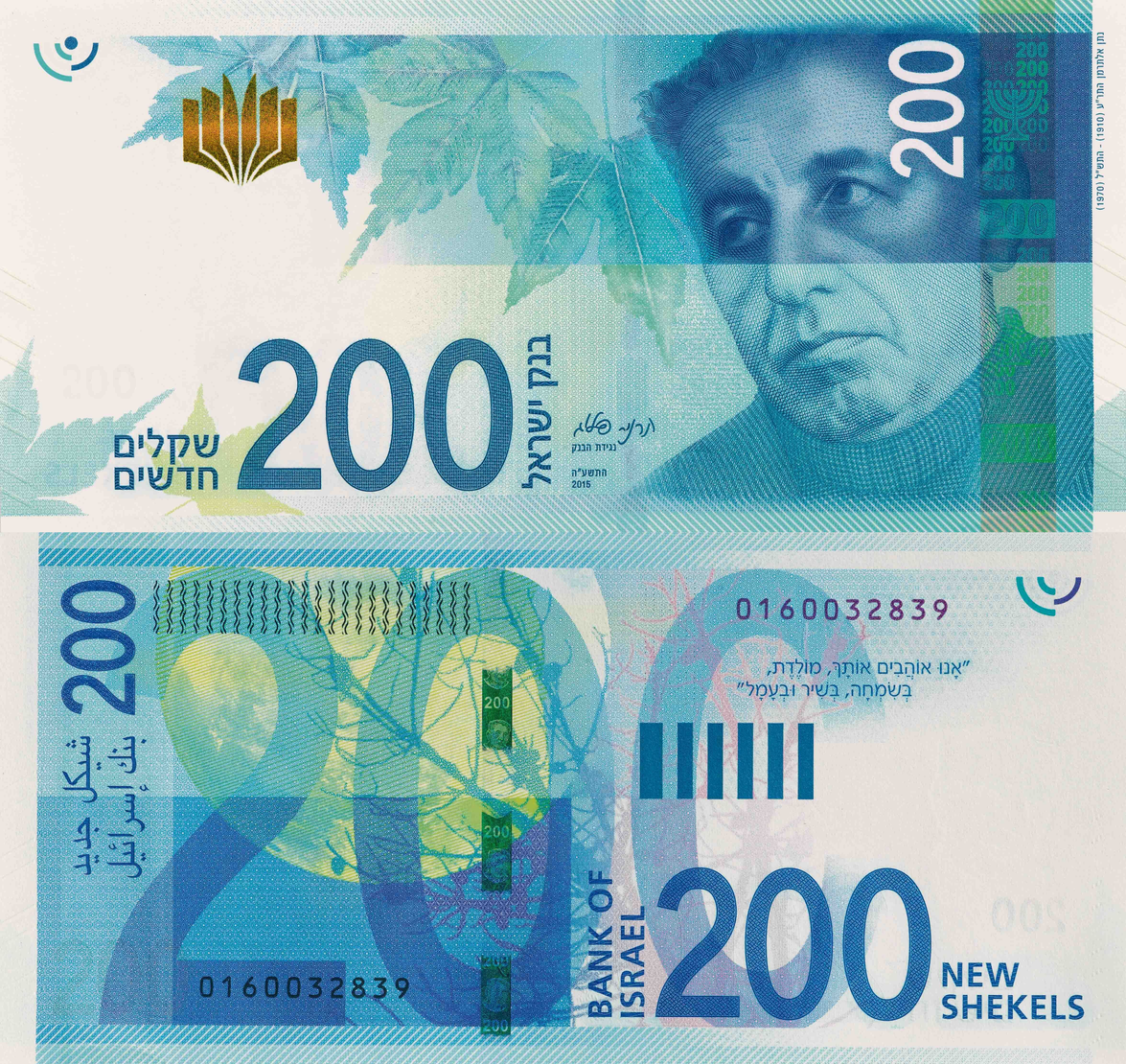
The 200-shekel banknote bearing Alterman's portrait

Alterman's portrait appears on the 200-shekel banknote, one of a series honouring Hebrew poets. Streets are named after him in Tel Aviv, Ra'anana and Hod HaSharon, among other Israeli cities, and schools in Tel Aviv and Netanya carry his name. A plaque commemorating Alterman, Rachel Marcus and Tirtza Atar marks the family's home at 30 Nordau Boulevard in Tel Aviv, where they lived from 1955 until his death.

== Books (Hebrew) ==
=== Poetry ===
- Stars Outside (Hebrew: כוכבים בחוץ). Yachdav Publishing, 1938; Machbarot Lesifrut Publishing, 1945; Hakibbutz Hameuchad Publishing House, 1995
- Joy of the Poor (Hebrew: שמחת עניים). Machbarot Lesifrut Publishing, 1941
- Plague Poems (Hebrew: שירי מכות מצרים). Machbarot Lesifrut Publishing, 1944
- The Seventh Column [vol. 1] (Hebrew: הטור השביעי : שירי העת והעתון). Am Oved Publishing, 1948; New editions: Hakibbutz Hameuchad Publishing House, 2003; 2004
- The Seventh Column [vol. 2] (Hebrew: הטור השביעי : שירי העת והעתון, ספר שני). Davar, 1954
- City of the Dove (Hebrew: עיר היונה). Machbarot Lesifrut Publishing, 1957
- Poems of Ten Brothers (Hebrew: שיר עשרה אחים). Machbarot Lesifrut Publishing, 1961
- Summer Celebration (Hebrew: חגיגת קיץ). Machbarot Lesifrut, 1965
- Pythagoras' Trial (Hebrew: משפט פיתגורס). Machbarot Lesifrut, 1965
- Moments (Hebrew: רגעים). Hakibbutz Hameuchad Publishing House, 1974
- The Silver Platter: Selected Poems (Hebrew: מגש הכסף : מבחר שירים). Ministry of Defense, 1974
- The Front Stand (Hebrew: העמדה הקדמית : משירי העת והעתון). Hakibbutz Hameuchad Publishing House, Mosad Alterman, 1980
- From: Stars Outside, Joy of the Poor, Plague Poems, City of the Dove (Hebrew: מתוך ׳כוכבים בחוץ׳, ׳שמחת עניים׳, ׳שירי מכות מצרים׳, ׳עיר היונה). Hakibbutz Hameuchad Publishing House, 1980
- Poems 1931-1935 (Hebrew: שירים 1935-1931). Hakibbutz Hameuchad Publishing House, 1984
- In Praise of Frivolity (Hebrew: שבחי קלות הדעת). Hakibbutz Hameuchad Publishing House, 1997
- Poems of Yore (Hebrew: שירים שמכבר). Hakibbutz Hameuchad Publishing House, 1999
- The Seventh Column : Israeli Art from the Benno Kalev's Collection (Hebrew: הטור השביעי : אמנות ישראלית מאוסף בנו כלב). Hakibbutz Hameuchad Publishing House, 2000

=== Plays ===
- Kinneret, Kinneret (Hebrew: כנרת, כנרת). Hakibbutz Hameuchad Publishing House, 1962
- Ghosts' Inn (Hebrew: פונדק הרוחות). Amikam, 1963
- Esther the Queen (Hebrew: אסתר המלכה). Hakibbutz Hameuchad Publishing House, 1966
- Last Days of Ur (Hebrew: ימי אור האחרונים). Edited with Introduction and Notes by Dwora Gilula, Hakibbutz Hameuchad Publishing House, 1990

=== Children-Picture Books ===
- The Tenth Chick (Hebrew: האפרוח העשירי). Machbarot Lesifrut Publishing, 1943; new editions - Hakibbutz Hameuchad Publishing House, 1973, 2005
- The Singing Book of Friendship (Hebrew: ספר התבה המזמרת). Machbarot Lesifrut, 1958
- Ardel the Wonder (Hebrew: ערדל הפלא). Machbarot Lesifrut Publishing, 1962
- The Puzzle Book (Hebrew: ספר החידות). Hakibbutz Hameuchad Publishing House, 1971
- To Children (Hebrew: לילדים). Hakibbutz Hameuchad Publishing House, 1972
- Og King of Bashan (Hebrew: עוג מלך הבשן). Hakibbutz Hameuchad Publishing House, 1975, new edition 2011
- Rhymes for children (Hebrew: חרוזים לילדים). Hakibbutz Hameuchad Publishing House, 1976 new edition 2002
- What a Wonder (Hebrew: איזה פלא). Hakibbutz Hameuchad Publishing House, 1983
- A Tale of a Small Chirik (Hebrew: מעשה בחיריק קטן). Hakibbutz Hameuchad Publishing House, 2003
- A Tale of a Final Pe (Hebrew: מעשה בפ"א סופית). Hakibbutz Hameuchad Publishing House, 2000
- It All Happened at Hannuka (Hebrew: זה היה בחנכה, או, נס גדול היה פה). Hakibbutz Hameuchad Publishing House, 2001

=== Songs ===
- Love Poems (Hebrew: שירי אהבה). Hakibbutz Hameuchad Publishing House, 1998
- Tel-Aviv Serenade (Hebrew: סרנדה תל-אביבית). Hakibbutz Hameuchad Publishing House, 1999
- You Should Ring Twice (Hebrew: צריך לצלצל פעמיים : שירי-זמר, שירי-ספר, פזמונים). Hakibbutz Hameuchad Publishing House, Israel Broadcasting Authority, 2002

=== Satire ===
- The Final Mask (Hebrew: המסכה האחרונה). Maariv, 1968

=== Non-Fiction ===
- Breaking the Circle (Hebrew: במעגל : מאמרים ורשימות, תרצ״ב־תשכ״ח). Hakibbutz Hameuchad Publishing House, 1971
- Writings in Four Volumes (Hebrew: כתבים בארבעה כרכים). Hakibbutz Hameuchad Publishing House, 1962
- The Triangular Thread (Hebrew: החוט המשולש). Hakibbutz Hameuchad Publishing House, 1971
- The Alterman Notebooks [Vol A] (Hebrew: מחברות אלתרמן, כרך א׳). Hakibbutz Hameuchad Publishing House together with Katz Research Institute for Hebrew Literature, Tel-Aviv University, 1977
- Little Tel Aviv (Hebrew: תל־אביב הקטנה). Hakibbutz Hameuchad Publishing House, 1979
- The Alterman Notebooks [Vol B] (Hebrew: מחברות אלתרמן, כרך ב׳). Hakibbutz Hameuchad Publishing House and Mosad Alterman, 1979
- The Alterman Notebooks [Vol C] (Hebrew: מחברות אלתרמן, כרך ג׳). Hakibbutz Hameuchad Publishing House and Mosad Alterman, 1981
- Between the Poet and the Statesman (Hebrew: בין המשורר למדינאי). Hakibbutz Hameuchad Publishing House, 1981, ext. ed. Hakibbutz Hameuchad Publishing House, Mosad Alterman, 1986
- The Alterman Notebooks [Vol D] (Hebrew: מחברות אלתרמן, כרך ד׳). Hakibbutz Hameuchad Publishing House, 1986
- Both Roads (Hebrew: על שתי הדרכים). Hakibbutz Hameuchad Publishing House, Mosad Alterman, 1989
- Essays and Articles (Hebrew: סער ופרץ : פרוזה ומאמרים). Hakibbutz Hameuchad Publishing House, 2019

== See also ==
- List of Bialik Prize recipients
- List of Israel Prize recipients
- Arik Einstein performing Nathan Alterman's (and Naomi Shemer's) "Meeting without end" on YouTube
- "Natan Alterman". Jewish Virtual Library.
- "Natan Alterman, Three Poems". Tikvah.
