= Lilith Nagar =

Israeli television host, actress and singer (born 1935)

Lilith "Lilit" Naggar (Hebrew: לילית נגר; born August 22, 1935), also known as Layla Najar (Arabic: ليلى نجار), is an Israeli Arabic-language television host, actress and singer.

== Background ==
Lilit Naggar was born on August 22, 1935, in Mandate Palestine but grew up in Egypt. The family returned to Israel after the establishment of the state. At the age of 15, she settled with her family on Kibbutz Shluhot, a modern-orthodox kibbutz affiliated with the Religious Kibbutz Movement. Naggar was married to Zouzou Moussa, an Egyptian-born musician who played with the Israel Radio Arabic orchestra.

Her family is of Egyptian-Jewish descent

== Music, theater and television career ==
At 17, Nagar recorded her first song, which became a hit. Early in her career she performed original Hebrew songs and songs from Hebrew musicals. but gradually established herself as an Israeli Arab-language TV anchor and singer. She took an active part in Mizrahi music festivals featuring music of Middle Eastern and Mediterranean origin. One of the first hits of Zohar Argov, one of Israel's leading Mizrahi singers, was a cover version of one of Nagar’s songs.

As an actress she performed with the Beit Lessin Theater group. In the early 1970s, she hosted an Arabic-language children's show on Israeli television, “The Flying Carpet.” In 1972, she appeared in the theatre comedy “Catch.” In 1977, she played in the movie “Midnight Entertainment Lady." In 1981, she landed a part in “The End of Milton Levi” (1981). In 1983, she appeared in TV drama series “Michel Ezra Safra and Sons” based on a novel by Amnon Shamosh. Participated in "HaShir Shelanu" (2007).

== See also ==
- Television in Israel
- Music in Israel
