= Debora Vogel =

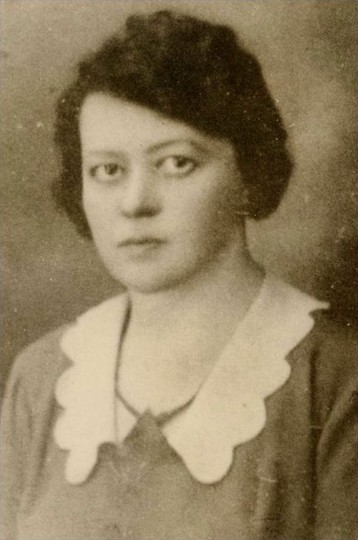
- Born: 1900; Burshtyn, Kingdom of Galicia and Lodomeria, Austro-Hungarian Empire
- Died: 1942 (aged 39–40); Lwów, General Government, Nazi Germany
- Education: Jan Kazimierz University
- Occupations: Philosopher, poet
- Spouse: Szulim Barenblüth (m. 1932)
- Children: 1

Debora Vogel (1900–1942; alternative spellings: Dvora Vogel and Dvoyre Fogel) was a Polish philosopher and poet who published work in Yiddish and Polish. During World War I her family fled to Vienna and later moved to Lwów (today Lviv), where Vogel spent most of her life. She studied philosophy and psychology at the Jan Kazimierz University (now Ivan Franko National University of Lviv).

== Biography ==
Vogel was born to a Polish-speaking Jewish family in Burshtyn, Galicia, Austro-Hungary (today in Ukraine). During her time at the Jewish gymnasium, she was active in the Zionist youth movement. She later studied philosophy in Vienna and Polish literature in Kraków. In 1926 she obtained her Ph.D., with a doctoral dissertation on the influence of Hegel's aesthetics upon Józef Kremer. After completing her education, she taught psychology at a college in Lwów.

Vogel began writing poetry while at university, initially in German, and later Yiddish. She was active in Yiddish literary circles and contributed articles for several Yiddish journals, including Sygnały and Wiadmosci Literackie. She was also a contributor of essays, art reviews, poetry, and essays on poetry to Tsushtayer, a short-lived Lwów Yiddish journal of literature and art. She became a correspondent and close friend of writer and painter Bruno Schulz.

World War I forced Vogel's family to flee to Vienna. From there they moved to Lwów, where Vogel would spend the majority of her life. In 1932 Vogel married a Lwów architect and engineer named Szulim Barenblüth, and their only son, Anzelm, was born in 1937. Together with her husband and son, she was killed in the Lwów ghetto in 1942.

== Work ==
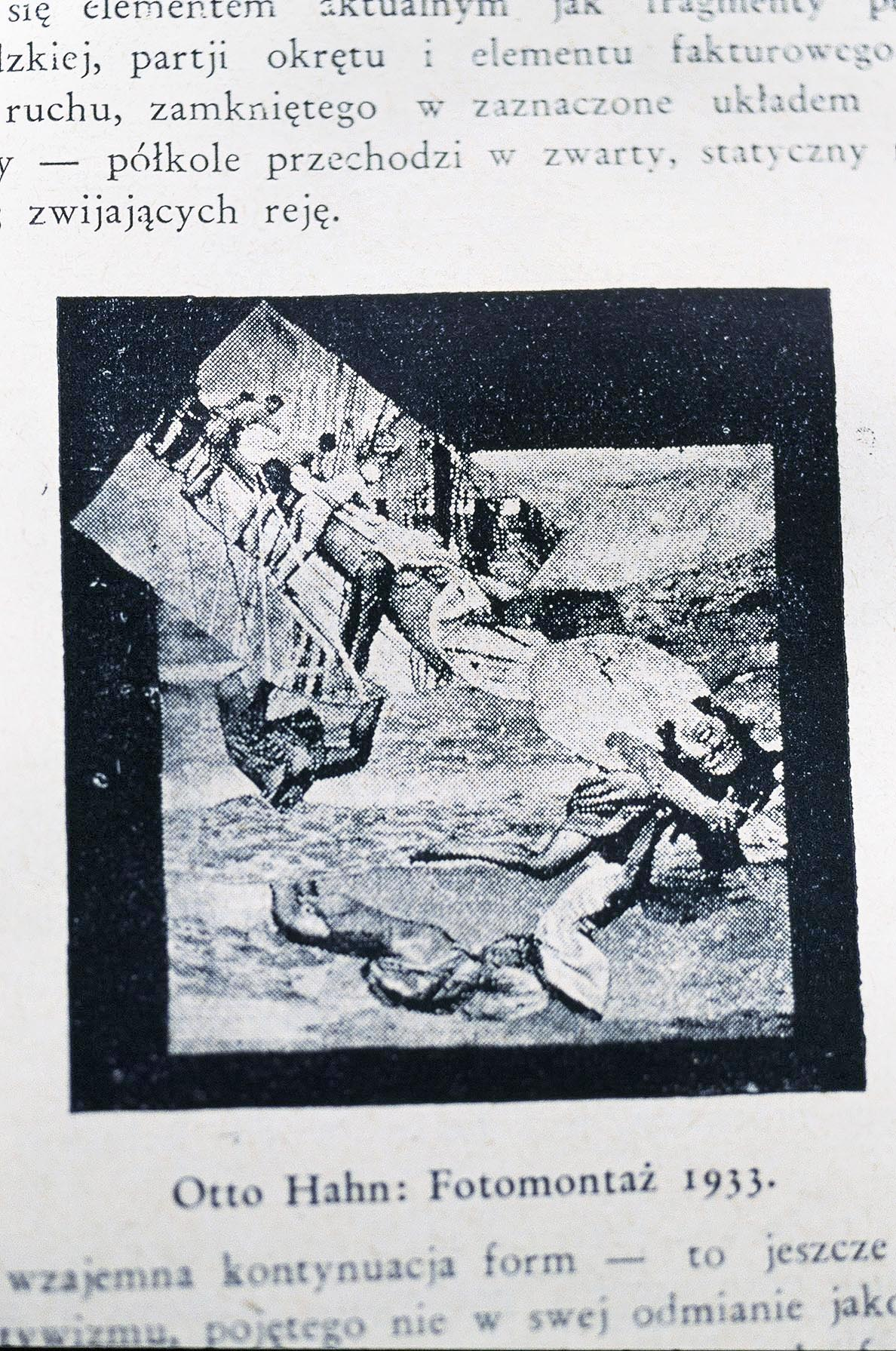
Illustration for Vogel's article Genealogy of Photomontage.

Vogel was a prolific poet and essayist. Her most famous poems are ″You are Light and Bowing,″ (1929), ″Day-Figures″ (1930), ″Mannequins″ (1934), ″Legend of Silver″ (1935). She also wrote some prose. These include Acacias Bloom (1935), Fragments of a Montage-Novel (1936), and Military Parade (1938). Vogel's essays include; Theme and Form in the Art of Chagall (1929), ′White Words′ in Poetry (1931), Stasis, Dynamics and Contemporaneity in Art (1936) and The Literary Genre of Montage (1937).

Her poetic legacy is marked for its experimental spirit. Her poems, mostly written in the 1930s, reflect the contemporary radical and minimalistic outlook in art. Her experiment in poetry was mostly about fusing poetry and art. She called this technique "white words", and described it as an attempt to "create a new lyric poetry of the urban condition." This style was, however, not appreciated by critics, both during her lifetime and later, who considered it too intellectual, obscure and devoid of feminist themes. Vogel responded to such claims by stating that her style was not deliberate, but an outcome necessitated by life's experiences.
