= Celia Dropkin =

American poet

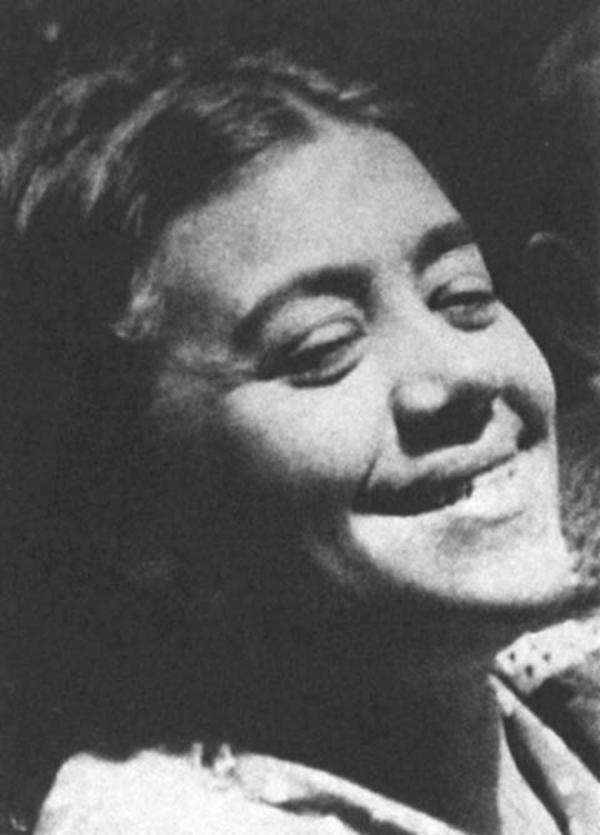
- Born: December 5, 1887; Bobruysk, Russian Empire
- Died: August 18, 1956 (aged 68); New York City
- Occupation: Yiddish Poet

Celia Dropkin (Yiddish: ציליע דראַפּקין, 5 December [O.S. 23 November] 1887 – August 18, 1956) was a Russian-born American Yiddish poet, writer, and artist.

== Biography ==
Celia Dropkin (Yiddish name Zipporah Levine, and later Tsilye Drapkin), was born in Bobruysk, Russian Empire to an assimilated Russian-Jewish family. Her father, a forester, died of tuberculosis when Dropkin was young, after which she, her mother, and her sister were taken in by wealthy relatives. Dropkin exhibited intellectual abilities at a young age and attended Russian-language school and gymnasium (high school), after which she taught briefly in Warsaw. In 1907 she went to Kiev to continue her studies, and there came under the influence of Hebrew writer Uri Nissan Gnessin. Under his tutelage she wrote poetry in Russian. She returned to Bobruysk in 1908, and shortly thereafter met and married Shmaye Dropkin, a Bund activist from Gomel, Belarus. Shmaye was forced to flee to America in 1910 due to his political activities, leaving Dropkin and their son (John Joseph Dropkin) to follow two years later.

Dropkin became active in Yiddish cultural circles in New York City, translating many of her Russian poems into Yiddish for publication in Yiddish literary journals beginning in 1917. For many years she was a regular contributor to a wide variety of journals; she also wrote stories and a serialized novel to earn money, but was more interested in poetry.

During the Depression the family moved frequently in search of work. They lived for several years in Virginia and later in Massachusetts, before returning permanently to New York in the late 1930s. In 1943 her husband died unexpectedly; after this event her output slowed considerably.

Dropkin died of cancer in 1956, and was buried in the Arbeter Ring section of Mt. Lebanon Cemetery in Queens, New York.

== Work ==
While often associated with the In Zikh (Introspectivist) movement, her work does not adhere closely to that group's ethic. She did, in common with the Inzikhistn, employ free verse much of the time; and she believed any subject matter was appropriate for Yiddish poetry, not only specifically Jewish ones. Her deeply personal poems, however, tended to put off male critics such as Boruch Rivkin and Shmuel Niger. Her social world overlapped with members of many literary movements. She was a close friend of poet Zishe Landau, one of the founders of the slightly earlier, rival group, Di Yunge. She also was friendly with Anna Margolin, who also refused to adhere to a single poetic model.

Both her poems and short stories reflect her biography but are not identical to it. She wrote many poems of nature and several evoking places she visited or lived. A large number of poems relate to her children or children in general, one of which was set to music as a lullaby by Abraham Ellstein. However, she is best known for her erotic poems related to passion, sexuality and depression. Her poems express longing, guilt, fury, even violence, and include frank explorations of sado-masochism. Her imagery includes Christian and classical references to a much greater extent than traditional Jewish ones. Like a number of other Yiddish women writers, she uses few words of Hebrew or Aramaic origin, for reasons that appear to involve a specific rejection of a literary idiom replete with Biblical and Talmudic references, a common device among male Yiddish and Hebrew writers of the age. "Dropkin's stature in Yiddish literature is groundbreaking in its candor about sex, love, death and relationships between men and women."

The last poem published in her lifetime was the 1953 "Fun Ergets Ruft a Fayfl" (From Somewhere a Whistle Calls), an ode to her long-dead friend Zishe Landau, which appeared in Di Tsukunft. Dropkin had only one volume of poems published in her lifetime, In heysn vint (In the Hot Wind) in 1935. After that she took up painting and may have completely stopped writing poetry. She was considered a gifted natural artist and her paintings won amateur competitions. She spent significant time during these years in Florida and the Catskills.

Her children published an expanded edition of In Heysn Vint in 1959, which includes previously uncollected poems, a selection of her stories, and paintings. The 150 poems in the second edition of In Heysn Vint comprise the vast majority of her output, although there are poems among her personal papers and in literary journals that have not yet been collected or translated.

Dropkin's best-known poem is Di Tsirkus Dame (translated as The Acrobat, The Circus Dancer or The Circus Lady), which portrays the deep ambivalence of both the acrobat and her audience in matters of life and death. This poem has been translated in English at least nine times. Several of her poems have been set to music by Dropkin, The Klezmatics, the Flying Bulgar Klezmer Band, and Charming Hostess. A book of translations into French was published in Paris in 1994 as Dans le Vent Chaud, and contains about half her total work. The first English-language collection of her poems was published in 2014 by Tebot Bach Press, under the title The Acrobat: Selected Poems of Celia Dropkin.

== Works in translation ==
Poems

- The Acrobat: Selected Poems of Celia Dropkin. Huntington Beach, CA: Tebot Bach, 2014. Texts in Yiddish and English. Translated by Faith Jones, Jennifer Kronovet, and Samuel Solomon. ISBN 9781939678065
- Selection of poems: "I Am Drowning", "You Plowed My Fertile Soil", "My Mother", "The Circus Lady", "Adam", "[You didn't sow a child in me—]", [I have not yet seen you]", and "Sonya's room". In: Jules Chametzky et al. (Eds.), Jewish American Literature: A Norton Anthology. New York: Norton, 2001. ISBN 9780393048094. p. 257-263

Stories

- "At the Rich Relatives". Translated by Faith Jones. In: Sandra Bark (Ed.), Beautiful as the Moon, Radiant as the Stars: Jewish Women in Yiddish Stories: an Anthology. New York: Warner Books, 2003. ISBN 9780446691369. p. 55-74
- "The Dancer" (Di tentserin). Translated by Shirley Kumove. In: Frieda Forman et al. (Eds.), Found Treasures: Stories by Yiddish Women Writers. Toronto: Second Story Press, 1994. ISBN 9780929005539. p. 193-201

Novels

- Desires, translated by Anita Norich (White Goat Press, 2024). (Yiddish: Di tsvey gefiln). Originally serialized in The Yiddish Forward from March 31, 1934 to June 6, 1934.
