= Jacob Glatstein =

Polish-born American poet and literary critic

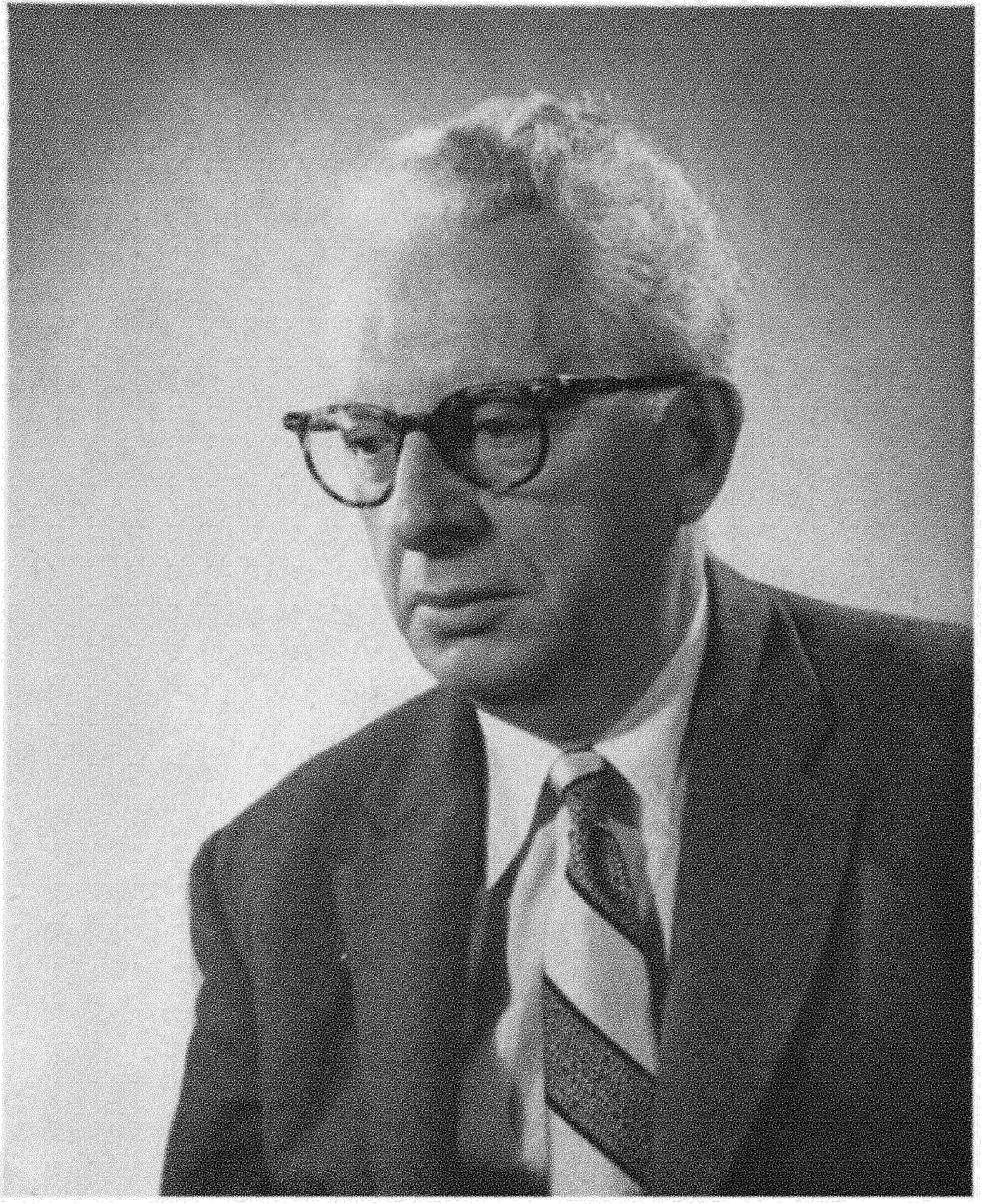

Jacob Glatstein (Yiddish: יעקב גלאטשטיין, 20 August 1896 – 19 November 1971) was a Polish-born American poet and literary critic who wrote in the Yiddish language. His name is also spelled Yankev Glatshteyn or Jacob Glatshteyn.

== Early life ==
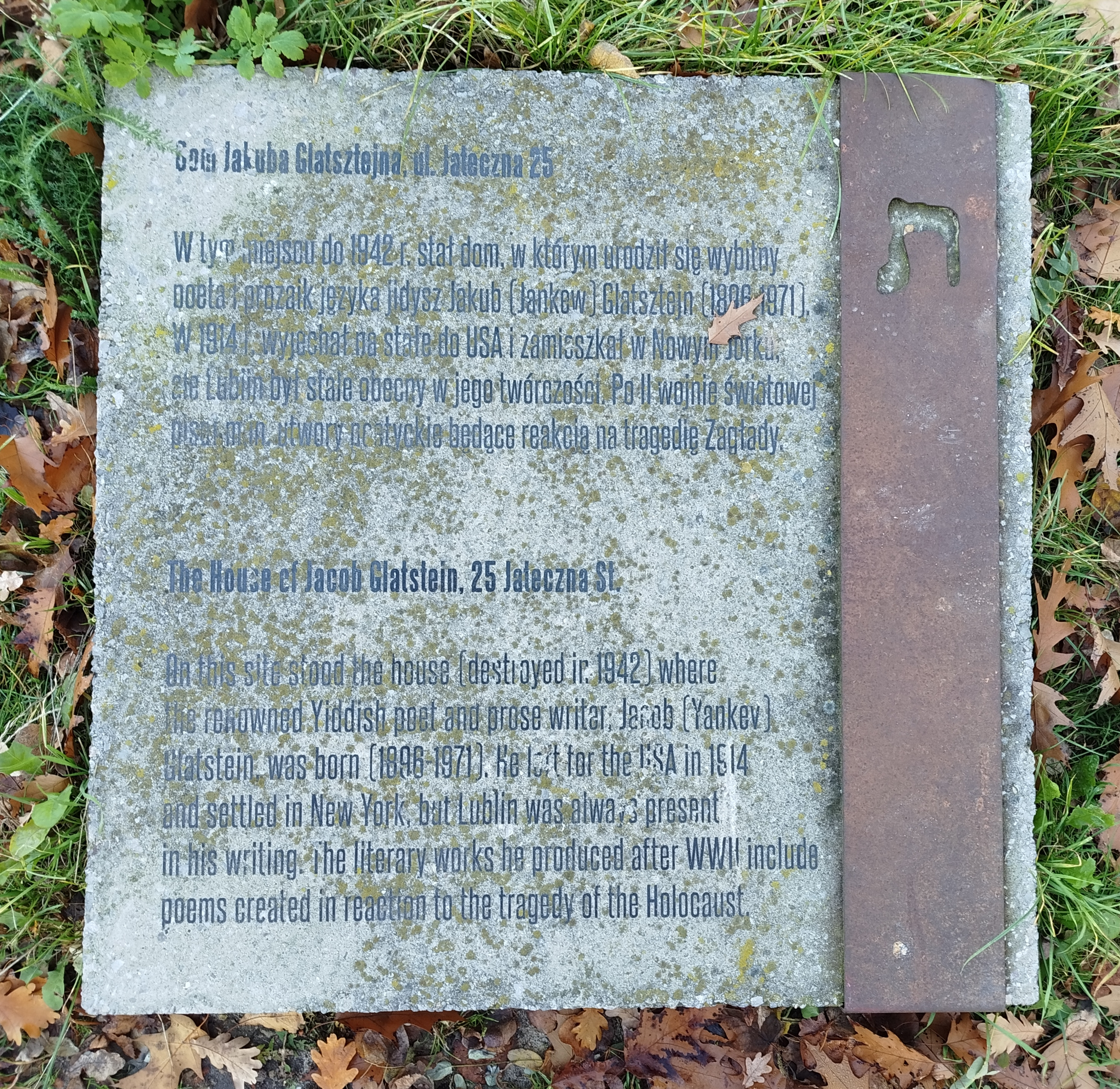
Commemoration at the site of the house where Jakub Glatsztejn was born

Glatstein was born in Lublin, Poland, at a time when Jews made up 51% of the city's population. Although his family identified with the Jewish Enlightenment movement, he received a traditional education until the age of 16, supplemented by private education in secular subjects, and an introduction to modern Yiddish literature. By age 13, he was already writing and traveled to Warsaw to share his work with celebrated Yiddish writers such as I. L. Peretz. In 1914, due to increasing antisemitism in Lublin, he immigrated to New York City, where his uncle lived. In the same year, his first story was published in an American Yiddish weekly publication. He worked in sweatshops while studying English. He started to study law at New York University in 1918, where he met the young Yiddish poet N. B. Minkoff, but later dropped out. He worked briefly at teaching before switching to journalism. He married Netti Bush in 1919, with whom he had two sons and a daughter. His second marriage was to Fanny Mazel. His sister was Lola Glatstein Cynamon, and his niece was the Greek and Latin classics translator, Prof. Dwora Cynamon Gillula.

== Career ==
Glatstein established the Inzikhist (Introspectivist) literary movement with Aaron Glanz-Leyeles and Minkoff in 1920, and founded the literary organ In zikh. The Inzikhist credo rejected metered verse and declared that non-Jewish themes were a valid topic for Yiddish poetry. His books of poetry include Jacob Glatshteyn (1921) and A Jew from Lublin (1966). Glatstein's first book, titled under his own name, established him as the most daring and experimental of Yiddish poets in terms of form and style, as well as highly skillful in the verbal manipulation of free verse poetry. He was also a regular contributor to the New York Yiddish daily Jewish Morning Journal and the Yiddisher Kemfer in which he published a weekly column entitled "In Tokh Genumen" (The Heart of the Matter). He was also the director of Yiddish public relations for the American Jewish Congress.

He was interested in exotic themes and in poems that emphasized the sound of words. He traveled to Lublin in 1934 to attend his mother's funeral, and this trip gave him insight into the growing possibility of war in Europe. After this trip, his writings returned to Jewish themes, and he wrote pre-Holocaust works that eerily foreshadowed coming events. After the Second World War, he became known for passionate poems written in response to the Holocaust, but many of his poems also evoke golden memories and thoughts about eternity.

He died on November 19, 1971, in New York City.

== Awards ==
He won acclaim as an outstanding figure of mid-20th-century American Yiddish literature only later in life, winning the Louis Lamed Prize in 1940 for his works of prose, and again in 1956 for a volume of collected poems titled From All My Toil. In 1966, he won the H. Leivick Yiddish literary award from the Congress for Jewish Culture.

== Legacy ==
Glatstein was memorialized in Cynthia Ozick's short story Envy.

== Selected works ==
- Jacob Glatshteyn, book of poems in Yiddish, 1921;
- Free Verse (Fraye ferzn, 1926);
- Kredos (Credos, New York, 1929) poems;
- Di purim-gvardye (The Purim Guard, 1931), a play;
- Yidishtaytshn (Yiddish meanings, 1937), poems;
- When Yash Set Out (Ven Yash Iz Geforn, 1938) resulted from his 1934 trip to Lublin;
- Homecoming at Twilight (Venn Yash Iz Gekumen, 1940), another work reflecting his 1934 trip to Lublin;
- Emil un Karl, a book published in 1940 and written for children. The book is about two boys in pre-World War II Vienna: Karl, a Christian from a Socialist family, and his friend Emil, a Jew. Glatstein wanted children to understand the changes taking place in Europe, where Vienna was no longer the same Vienna ("vienn is shoyn nisht di aygene vienn fun amol").;
- Gedenklider (Poems of Remembrance, 1943);
- Shtralndike yidn (Jubilant Jews, 1946), poems;
- The Joy of the Yiddish Word (di freyd fun yidishen vort, 1961); and
- A Jew of Lublin (A Yid fun Lublin, 1966)
- The Selected Poems of Jacob Glatstein (October House, 1973); translated from the Yiddish and with an Introduction by Ruth Whitman
