= Schaechter-Gottesman =

The Schaechter-Gottesman family is a leading family in Yiddish language and cultural studies.

Members include:

- Lifshe Schaechter-Widman (née Gottesman) (1893-1974) – folksinger, author of Yiddish autobiography
- Beyle Schaechter-Gottesman (1920-2013) - Yiddish poet, songwriter and folksinger
- Mordkhe Schaechter (1927-2007) - Yiddish expert, linguist, researcher, teacher, and writer
- Charlotte (Charne) Schaechter née Saffian (1927-2014) - Yiddish piano accompanist and translator
- Itzik Gottesman (1957-) - Yiddish journalist and associate editor of The Forward; expert on Yiddish folklore
- Rukhl Schaechter (1957-) - Yiddish journalist with The Forward; host of on-line cooking show, Est gezunterheyt
- Gitl Schaechter-Viswanath (1958-) - Yiddish poet, and editor
- Eydl Reznik née Schaechter (1962-) - Yiddish teacher and choir director, as well as artist
- Binyumen Schaechter (1963-) - Yiddish composer, choral conductor, piano accompanist, and translator
- Arun Schaechter Viswanath - Yiddish translator of novels about Harry Potter and Pippi Longstocking.
- Reyna Schaechter (1995-) - Yiddish singer

== See also ==
- Gottesman (disambiguation)
- Schächter, Schechter
