= Dina Abramowicz =

American librarian (1909-2000)

- Dina Abramowicz
- Born: 1909; Vilnius, Vilna Governorate, Russian Empire
- Died: April 3, 2000 (aged 90–91)
- Education: Stefan Batory University; Columbia University School of Library Service
- Occupations: Historian; librarian; Yiddish language expert

Dina Abramowicz (Yiddish: דינה אַבראַמאָװיטש; 1909 – April 3, 2000) was a librarian at YIVO and a Yiddish language expert.

== Early life and education ==
Abramowicz was born in Vilnius, then under Russian rule. Her parents were teachers. Though her first language was Russian, when the Germans occupied Vilnius during World War I, they allowed Jews to establish their own schools. Abramowicz's parents sent her to a Yiddish-language elementary and high schools. During her university years she studied Polish literature. In 1936, Abramowicz graduated from Stefan Batory University with a degree in humanities.

== Career ==
Her first job was at a children's library in Vilnius, the Kinderbibliotek. Soon after its founding she joined YIVO.

During World War II, Vilnius's Jews were put in ghettos. A librarian, Herman Kruk, organized a library and asked Abramowicz to staff it. "How can we think of a library under these conditions, and who will come to read books there?" she remembered asking a fellow librarian. "Since there was nothing one could do about this absurd situation, what was the use of talking and wondering?" was the response. During its initial year, the ghetto library lent 100,000 books, mostly of escapist fiction to relieve the suffering of the ghetto residents.

The Vilnius ghetto was liquidated in 1943. Abramowicz's mother was sent to Treblinka, where she was murdered. Abramowicz was to be sent to a labor camp, but when the train car door opened on the Vilnius platform, she walked out unnoticed and made her escape, eventually working in a camp devoted to processing winter coats for the German army. She escaped into the woods and joined Jewish resistance fighters as a nurse's helper.

After the war she made her way to New York City, where she reunited with her father, who had relocated there prior to the war. There she encountered Max Weinreich, one of YIVO's founders, and together they worked to reconstitute YIVO. In 1947, Abramowicz was appointed assistant librarian at YIVO. In 1953, Abramowicz received her master's degree in Science from the School of Library Science at Columbia University. She became the head librarian at YIVO in 1962, a position she held until 1987 when she was appointed research librarian, a position she held until her death.

People recalled Abramowicz as having a phenomenal memory and as being a knowledgeable source for information on the Yiddish culture of Eastern Europe.

== Legacy ==
After her death, YIVO established the Dina Abramowicz Emerging Scholar Fellowship for postdoctoral research in Eastern European Jewish Studies.

== Awards ==
- Dr. Chaim Zhitlowsky Prize, 1987, Yiddisher Kultur Farband.
- Dr. Berl Frimer Prize for Cultural Achievement, 1992, Congress for Jewish Culture.
- Leonard Wertheimer Multicultural Public Library Service Award, 1994, Public Library Association of the American Library Association.

== Publications ==
=== Bibliographies ===
- Yiddish literature in English translation; books published 1945–1967. New York: Yivo Institute for Jewish Research, 1967.
- Yiddish literature in English translation : list of books in print. New York : Yivo Institute for Jewish Research, 1976. ISBN 0914512366
- "Die Bibliothek im Wilnaer Ghetto, 1941–1943" in: Bücher und Bibliotheken in Ghettos und Lagern (1933–1945). Kleine historische Reihe der Zeitschrift Laurentius, Band 3. Hannover: Laurentius, 1991.

=== Book chapters ===
- "The library in the Vilna ghetto" in: The Holocaust and the book: destruction and preservation, edited by Jonathan Rose. Amherst, MA: University of Massachusetts Press, 2001. ISBN 9781558496439

=== Conference proceedings ===
- Guardians of a tragic heritage: reminiscences and observations of an eyewitness. New York: National Foundation for Jewish Culture/Council of Archives and Research Libraries in Jewish Studies, 1999.

=== Encyclopedia entries ===
- "Di Geto-Biblyotek in Vilne" [The ghetto library of Vilna]. In Lite (Lithuania). Vol. 1, edited by Mendel Sudarsky, Uriah Katzenelenbogen, and J. Kissin (1951), cols. 1671–1678.

=== Journal articles ===
- "Ethnic Survival in the New World: Yiddish Juvenilia." Wilson Library Bulletin 50, no. 2 (1975): 138–145.
- "The World of My Parents: Reminiscences." YIVO Annual 23 (1996): 105–157.
- "The YIVO Library." Jewish Book Annual 24 (1967–1968): 87–102.
- "Yom Kippur, 1941–1945: Memories of the Vilna Ghetto." Jewish Frontier 14, no. 1 (1947): 18–22.
