= Zemach Shabad =

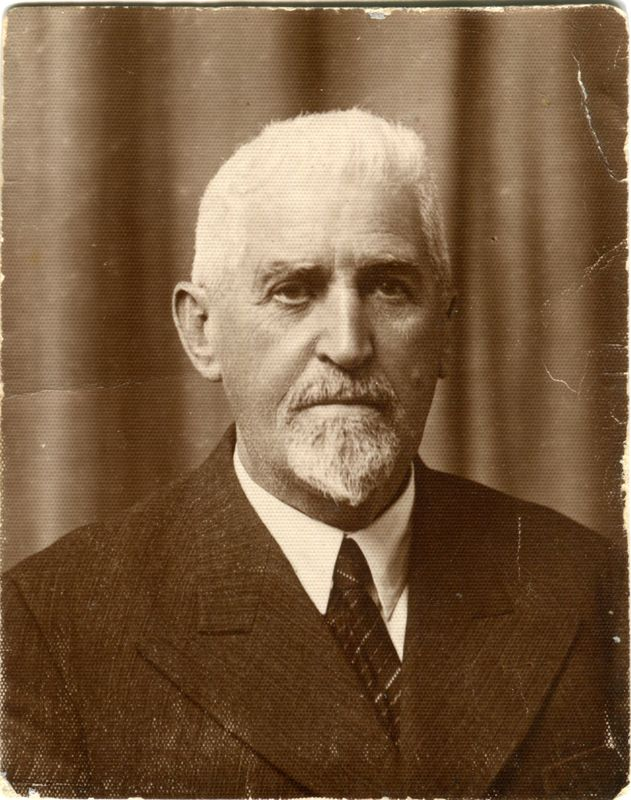
- Born: 5 February 1864; Vilnius
- Died: 20 January 1935 (aged 70); Vilnius
- Education: Imperial Moscow University
- Occupation: Physician
- Spouse: Stefania Grodzensky (murdered 1943 during Holocaust)
- Children: 3
- Relatives: Max Weinreich (son-in-law)

Zemach Shabad (Hebrew: צמח שאבאד, Polish: Cemach Szabad, Russian: Цемах Шабад, Tsemakh Shabad; 5 February 1864, Vilnius, Russian Empire (now Vilnius, Lithuania) — 20 January 1935, Vilnius) was a Jewish medical doctor and social and political activist. He was a member of the Senate (parliament) of the Second Polish Republic (1928) and a co-founder and vice-president of the YIVO (Institute for Jewish Research). In 1932, Shabad toured to Palestine with Dr. Abel Lapin from Kaunas. During his trip, Shabad hosted by the Health Committee of the Knesset and the Jerusalem Medical Association.

He was one of the originators of the volkist movement, which eventually turned into the Folkspartei (Jewish People's Party). Following the October Revolution, Shabad lent a room in his residence to Belarusian Bundist Paul Novick, who came to take over as editor of the Bundist newspaper Undzer shtime (Our Voice) for Max Weinreich, who was elected to the governing body of the city's Jewish community. All three men were forced to take refuge in Shabad's home during the Vilna pogrom in 1919.

In the late 1930s a monument on the outskirts of Vilnius was erected in Shabad's honor; it was destroyed during WWII. In 2007 he was honoured with another monument in Vilnius, reflecting the fact that he was the prototype of "Doctor Aybolit", a good doctor from a children's poem by Korney Chukovsky.

== Family ==
- Regina, Mrs. Max Weinreich, daughter
- Jacob Shabad, son
- Josif Shabad, son
- Uriel Weinreich, grandson, an American linguist
- Gabriel Weinreich, grandson, expert in musical acoustics
