= Moshe Shalit =

Lithuanian Jewish journalist and ethnographer

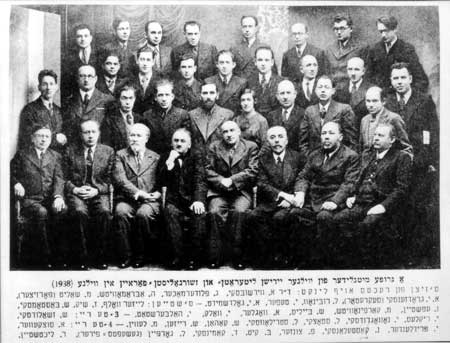
Photo of the Union of Yiddish Language Writers and Journalists members from Wilno in 1938. Moshe Shalit, the president, is seated in the first row, fifth from the left.

Moshe Shalit (Yiddish: משה שאליט; 22 December 1885, Vilnius - 19 July 1941, Vilnius) was a researcher, journalist, essayist, ethnographer, and humanist of the inter-war period.

Shalit devoted himself to the promotion of Yiddish language and of literature in a spirit of openness and interculturalism. He was an active member of the Jewish Scientific Institute, YIVO, which became the Yiddish Institute for Jewish Research. Shalit was murdered by Nazi Germany in one of the large massacres in Vilnius.

== Youth ==
Growing up without a father, Shalit quickly became a recognized cultural activist in the Jewish socialist movement. He attended college several years in Koenigsburg. While he was arrested on several times and was a victim of police repression, he did not quit his studies. In fact, he devoted himself to his overflowing creative activity.

During the First World War, he worked with several newspapers in Vilna. He wrote monographs, book reviews and articles in many Yiddish language publications, which were abundant at the beginning of the 20th century.

In 1914 he went to America, continuing to publish and spending a lot of his effort in the social-educational domain.

After returning to Poland, during the German occupation, he founded a Yiddish-language Jewish school. He was administrator of the people's university, and president of the Historical Commission. In 1918, he became general secretary of the committee for organising the first democratic Jewish assembly in Vilna. The Russian Jewish writer and ethnographer S. Anski was a member of the steering committee. However, antisemitism raged. On April 19, 1919, the Polish Army (joined by volunteers) penetrated Vilna to restore Polish supremacy relative to the Russo-Soviets and to some extent the Germans. Vilna, whose status was unclear, was faced this with difficulty. The armed groups took control quickly and began a systematic program of violence against the city's Jewish population including razing, savage attacks, torture and killings. When calm was restored, the "wise men" of the community, including Shalit (then 34 years old), were called together to re-establish peace in people's minds.

== Wilno, center of Jewish intellectual life ==
The inter-war period was marked by Polish domination, and Vilna became Wilno. For many years, Shalit was to be a pillar of Wilno cultural life. He was general secretary of YEKOPO (an aid organisation for Jewish victims of war). He was also member of the ORT (the professional teaching organisation) and the OSE (a child protection organisation focused more and more during this period on disadvantaged Jewish children). These two organisations existed the whole time. Studies by Shalit on prominent Yiddish writers such as Mendele Mocher Sforim, Sholem Aleichem, Isaac Leib Peretz and Daniel Bergelson appeared in collection.

Wilno became the beacon of Jewish intellectual life, invigorated by the sheer diversity of its characters: from Hebraists, expert Biblical commentators and disciples of the Gaon to Marxist theorists, Yiddish language militants, Trotskyist dissidents and the anti-Zionist socialists of the Bund. In 1925, the fame of Wilno was such that the linguist Max Weinreich and the philosopher Zelig Kalmanovich established themselves there and were at the origin of a major cultural event, the creation of a Jewish Scientific Institute with a largely cultural calling, the YIVO. Academy and university at the beginning, it felt obliged additionally to welcome all those who, through their work, had participated in the spreading of Yiddish culture. The figurehead was Weinrich. Zalman Reisen, philologist and great Yiddish propagandist, set to work making the known the goals of the institution. The most modernist intellectuals of Wilno passed on news of the project. Among them, Shalit was called to join the research groups. YIVO quickly took on an international dimension; offices were opened in Warsaw, Berlin and New York City. Correspondents covered about 15 countries. Albert Einstein and Sigmund Freud associated themselves with it.

== The Jewish Cultural and Scientific Institute (YIVO) ==
Four departments were created within the institute:

1. History
2. Philology and Literature
3. Economics and Statistics (Shalit's department)
4. Psychology and Education.

In 1936, after a large amount of work and numerous investigations, YIVO established laws and conventions for the Yiddish language, based on Polish and Lithuanian usage. Furthermore, research was to be conducted by modern methods and recent innovations of the human and social scientists into a better understanding of Jewish identity. The researchers published in Yiddish, English, German and Polish. Statistics was at that time a new science in Jewish culture; Shalit was one of the closest collaborators of Max Weinreich. Shalit's ethnographic studies outside the Economy and Statistics department referred to the situation of the Jews of Poland and the recent past. Shalit was, beyond this, a permanent collaborator of the most important literary journal, "Literary pages" which was circulated in Warsaw. In 1935, a complete work devoted to Wilno, in which Shalit participated, was published in New York. The following years, his collaboration with various literary journals such as "Jewish World" and "The World Of Books", continued. Shalit played a role in all the secular, cultural and social Jewish authorities in Wilno, and more significantly in Poland, and in all the representative institutions in New York, Berlin, Paris and Switzerland where YIVO was to be represented, and in PEN club congresses in which he was an active member.

== An open view of the world ==
Shalit was a polyglot, as were most YIVO members. There was no conflict for these people between the discovery of the world in its diversity and describing and protecting Yiddish culture. In 1938, Shalit published an important work of research with the Almanac of the Wilno Yiddish Writers' and Journalists' Union for the celebration of the Union's 20th anniversary. The first part described the socialist direction of the association and retraced its steps since foundation. The second part was devoted to literary texts, notably those of the Yung-Vilne literary group and many articles reflecting on diverse socio-cultural subjects. In the same year, Shalit was president of the Union of Yiddish Language Writers and Journalists. Recognition of the Jewish identity as a cultural phenomenon was important to Shalit. At that time in Wilno, there were 70,000 Jews, almost half the city's population. Philosophers, poets, artists, scientists, political militants, artisans, and shopkeepers all spoke Yiddish—and not just exclusively in the Jewish area around Zydowska and Straszuna streets. In this fertile environment, YIVO's intellectual activity was at its highest point.

It has been estimated that, before the Second World War, there were approximately 11 million Yiddish-speakers in Europe and the two principal destinations for immigration, the United States and South America. YIVO linguists, philologists, lexicographers and grammarians studied the Yiddish language. Specialists considered Lithuanian Yiddish, spoken in Wilno, to be the most literary dialect of Yiddish. Members of YIVO (particularly Shalit) viewed Judaism foremost as a culture—rather than a religion. As with all cultures, Judaism's foundations were assumed to be spiritual. YIVO's researchers were not preoccupied with making it religious.

== The destruction of Yiddishland and the fate of its culture ==
During the Second World War, the Nazi authorities solicited Shalit to sit on the Judenrat, the consultative committee designed by the occupiers and formed of prominent Jews from the city's two Jewish Ghettos. Shalit refused; his antifascist militant past seemed to him incompatible with membership.

In the middle of the night on July 29, 1941, the Gestapo arrested Shalit at his home on 15 Pohulanka Street (now called Basanaviciaus Street in modern Vilnius, Lithuania), a street also home to novelist Romain Gary and YIVO founder Max Weinreich. Shalit was one of the victims of the Ponary massacre, which took place eight kilometres southwest of Vilna. The bodies of 70,000 executed Jews were thrown into ditches in the forest of Ponar. Shalit's wife Deborah and their youngest daughter Ita were killed several months later in Belorussia where they had fled. The Holocaust extended throughout Europe; Yiddishland was to be wiped out.

Nonetheless, Yiddish texts were saved from the destruction. Although Yiddish has many fewer speakers than in the past, its readers and translators are gathering anew. Shalit's work to promote Yiddish culture continues into the 21st century.

== Works of Moshe Shalit ==
Note: The works of Moshe Shalit are primarily written in Yiddish. Yiddish characters were transliterated into Latin characters according to YIVO standards.

- (Yiddish) Moshe Shalit. Folk un land: zamlbikher spetseyl gevidmete der filozofish-gezelshaftlikher oyfklerung. Vilna, 1910.
- (Yiddish) Moshe Shalit. Vilner kulturele anshtalten biblioteken, shulen. Vilna, 1916
- (Yiddish) Moshe Shalit. Eili, Eili (en collaboration). Ed. O. Diston. Boston, 1918.
- (Yiddish) Moshe Shalit. Lider-zamelbukh: in kinder heym un oyf'n kinder-platz. Gezelshaft far Idishe folks-muzik. Petrograd, 1918.
- (Yiddish) Moshe Shalit. Literarishe etyudn. Ed. S. Sreberk. Vilne, 1920.
- (Yiddish) Moshe Shalit. Leben. Ed. Br. Rozenthal. Vilne, 1920-21.
- (Yiddish) Moshe Shalit. Di organizatsye un praktik fun Keren ha-yesod: der nisoyen fun 2 yor arbet in Lite. hoypt-byuro fun Keren ha-yesod. London, 1923.
- (Hebrew) Moshe Shalit. Eili, Eili Father, why hast thou forsaken me? Ed. Camden. Victrola, N.J., 1923.
- (Yiddish) Moshe Shalit. Fun yor tsu yor: illustrirter gezelshaftlikher lu'ah. Statistik, artiklen, materialn, bilder. Varsovie, 1926-29.
- (Yiddish) Moshe Shalit. Ekonomishe lage fun di Yidn in Polyn un di Yidishe kooperatsye: artiklen un materialn. Arband fun di Yidishe Kooperative gezelshaftn in Polyn. Vilne, 1926.
- (Yiddish) Moshe Shalit. Pinkes, oyf di'Hurban fun Mil'homè un Mehumè, 1919-1929, 1929.
- (Yiddish) Moshe Shalit. Luhos in unzer literatur. Wilno, 1929.
- (Yiddish) Moshe Shalit. Oyf di hurves fun milhomes un mehumes: pinkes fun Gegnt-komitet "Yekopo" 1919-1931. Gegnt-komitet,"Yekopo". Vilne, 1931.
- (Yiddish) Moshe Shalit. Doktor Tsema'h Shabad, der Visenshaftli'her un Publicist. Wilno, 1937.
- (Yiddish) Moshe Shalit. Z niedalekiej przeszlosci: kwartalnik historyczno-kulturalny, No. 1 Kwiecienczerwiec, 1937.
- (Yiddish) Moshe Shalit. Daniel Tcharny Bukh. Ed. A.B. Cerata. Paris, 1939.

== See also ==
- Cécile Cerf, Shalit's daughter, writer and World War II French resistance member.
- Yiddish language
- Yiddish literature
- YIVO
