= League for Yiddish =

Global non-profit organization

- ייִדיש־ליגע
- Founded: January 30, 1942; 84 years ago
- Type: 501(c)(3)
- Tax ID no.: 13-1502317
- Legal status: Nonprofit organization
- Purpose: To encourage young people to speak Yiddish in their daily lives; to enhance the prestige of Yiddish as a living language and to promote its modernization and standardization; to produce and distribute appropriate study materials for the study of and instruction in, the Yiddish language.
- Coordinates: 40.708888°N 74.005172°W
- Board Chair: Gitl Schaechter-Viswanath
- Revenue: $203,180 (2020)
- Expenses: $160,229 (2020)
- Employees: 4 (2020)
- Website: www.leagueforyiddish.org
- Formerly called: Freeland Territorialist League of America for Jewish Colonization

The League for Yiddish (in Yiddish: ייִדיש־ליגע) is a global, non-profit membership organization that promotes and encourages the active use of the Yiddish language in all areas of daily life. It is a charity with 501(c)(3) tax-exempt status, incorporated in the State of New York, U.S. The members of its board of directors and its staff live in the United States, Canada, and Israel. The League for Yiddish is one of the few secular Jewish organizations in the world that carries out nearly all its activities – from public events to staff meetings – in Yiddish.

== History ==
The organization was founded as the Freeland Territorialist League of America for Jewish Colonization (in Yiddish: פֿרײַלאַנד־ליגע) in London in 1935 and incorporated in New York State in 1942. The Freeland League advocated for the creation of Yiddish-speaking Jewish territories in every country in which Jews were present.

With the cessation of its territorialist activity decades earlier, the Freeland League officially changed its name to the League for Yiddish on September 13, 1979, in order to continue its focus on promoting Yiddish as a living language.

== Organizational goals and programs ==
The goals of the League for Yiddish are to:

- Encourage people to speak Yiddish in their everyday life;
- Enhance the prestige of Yiddish as a living language, both within and outside the Yiddish-speaking community; and
- Promote the modernization of Yiddish.

Organizational programs provide an array of resources and activities to ensure the relevance of the Yiddish language to contemporary life.

== Publications ==
The organization's publications include the following.

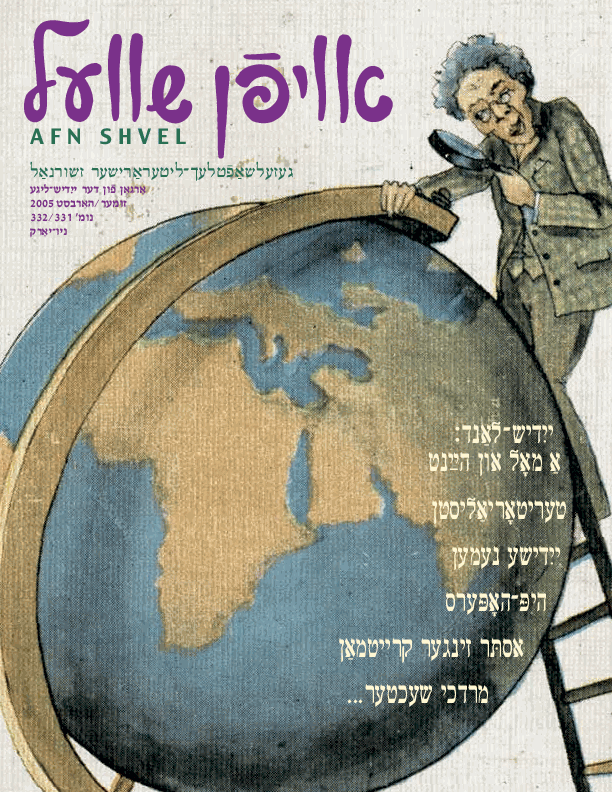
The organization's magazine: Afn Shvel אויפֿן שוועל

- Afn Shvel (in Yiddish: אויפֿן שוועל – "On the Threshold") is the League's magazine and the only all-Yiddish general interest magazine currently in print. The magazine was originally founded in 1941 as the voice of the Freeland League; with the dissolution of that organization, the magazine likewise changed its content and presentation. Today, Afn Shvel is the world's oldest, continuously published print Yiddish magazine. Selected articles published in previous issues of Afn Shvel are available for digital download on the organization's website. Its editors have included the following.

1941–1942: Abraham Rosen (pseudonym "Ben Adir"), in Yiddish: אַבֿרהם ראָזין (פּסעוודאָנים: בן־אַדיר)

1942–1956: Isaac Nachman Steinberg, in Yiddish: יצחק נחמן שטיינבערג

1957–1979: Dr. Mordkhe Schaechter, in Yiddish: מרדכי שעכטער, and Leybl Bayon, in Yiddish: לייבל באַיאָן

1979–2005: Dr. Mordkhe Schaechter, in Yiddish: מרדכי שעכטער

2005–2020: Dr. Sheva Zucker, in Yiddish: שבֿע צוקער

2020– : Dr. Miriam Trinh, in Yiddish: מרים טרין

- Comprehensive English-Yiddish Dictionary (Indiana University Press/League for Yiddish, 2016; second revised and expanded edition, 2021).

"The dictionary is the most comprehensive of its kind (English-Yiddish, Yiddish-English), and is co-edited by Gitl Schaechter-Viswanath and Dr. Paul (Hershl) Glasser, a Yiddish linguist and translator who also serves as the organization's linguistic advisor. The associate editor is Dr. Chava Lapin, a Yiddish scholar and educator. The dictionary is also available online by subscription.

- Motl Peyse the Cantor's Son (2017), an abridged and adapted edition of the children's stories of Sholem Aleichem.
- A variety of textbooks, graded readers, and Yiddish materials available through the League for Yiddish's website.

== Yiddish Resources ==
- Video documentaries include "A velt mit veltelekh: Shmuesn mit yidishe shraybers" ("Worlds within a World: Conversations with Yiddish Writers").
- "Words of the Week" (in Yiddish: "ווערטער פֿון דער וואָך"), a series of terminological word lists in Yiddish, is posted weekly on Facebook, Twitter, Instagram, and the organization's website, and emailed to member donors.
- Seminars, lectures, and live and/or online cultural events are featured on the League for Yiddish's YouTube channel. Regular uploads showcase original Yiddish content, including interviews with young Yiddish writers and other personalities in the Yiddish sphere, readings of literature, as well as Facebook, Twitter, and Instagram accounts.

== Organizational leadership ==
Gitl Schaechter-Viswanath, the current chair of the League for Yiddish board of directors, is the daughter of League for Yiddish founder Dr. Mordkhe Schaechter and collaborated with him in producing many of his publications on Yiddish language and terminology. The League for Yiddishboard of directors includes scholars of Yiddish and Jewish history, Yiddish writers and artists, and professionals in the fields of law, technology, business and human services.
