= Marvin Herzog =

Jewish-American professor (1927–2013)

- Born: September 13, 1927; Toronto, Ontario, Canada
- Died: June 28, 2013 (aged 85)
- Education: Columbia University
- Scientific career
- Fields: Yiddish
- Workplaces: Columbia University
- Doctoral advisor: Uriel Weinreich

Marvin (Mikhl) I. Herzog (September 13, 1927 – June 28, 2013) was a Yiddish language Professor at Columbia University.

== Biography ==
Herzog received his Ph.D. from Columbia under Uriel Weinreich.

In 1967, he became the director, and then the editor-in-chief, of the Yiddish Atlas Project at Columbia University, which publishes, in conjunction with YIVO, The Language and Culture Atlas of Ashkenazic Jewry (LCAAJ).

== Books ==
- Herzog, Marvin I., The Yiddish Language in Northern Poland. Its Geography and History, Indiana Univ., Bloomington, and The Hague, Mouton & Co., 1965.
- Herzog, Marvin, et al. ed., YIVO, The Language and Culture Atlas of Ashkenazic Jewry, 3 vols., Max Niemeyer Verlag, Tübingen, 1992–2000, ISBN 3-484-73013-7.

== See also ==
- Yiddish dialects
