= Gitl Schaechter-Viswanath =

American poet

Gitl Schaechter-Viswanath (born 1958) is a Yiddish-language poet and author.

== Early childhood and education ==
Gitl Schaechter was born in The Bronx New York. She grew up in a Yiddish-speaking home and attended Yiddish schools as a child. She attended school at the Sholem Aleichem Folkshul 21 and has degrees from Barnard College in Russian, Columbia University in nursing, and New York University in health administration. She also has a teaching diploma from the Jewish Teachers Seminary.

== Career ==
She began writing poetry, much of which was published in the journals Yugntruf and Afn Shvel, in 1980. Several poems were published in English and Yiddish in Hadassah magazine, the literary journal Five Fingers Review, and various anthologies. While her poems range widely in subject matter, her lyric technique is remarkably consistent. She tends towards short poems of no more than two pages, exploring single incidents or observations fully but using highly compressed language. She uses rhyme in many but not all poems, and varies rhyme scheme within a poem when necessary. She uses a variety of meter as well as unmetered verse. While her technique produces poems of unusual intensity, they are leavened with playfulness and puns. Her subject matter includes big questions such as marriage and grief; and small questions such as baking a failed loaf of bread. A poem about the day following the September 11, 2001 attacks is eerily still.

Her 2003 book Plutsemdiker Regn/Sudden Rain is a bilingual edition of about 40 of her poems in Yiddish and English. Although Schaechter-Viswanath is a native speaker of both languages, she does not write poetry in English and does not translate her own Yiddish works into English. Her translators are Zackary Sholem Berger, himself a poet in both English and Yiddish, and Jeffrey Shandler, associate professor of Jewish Studies at Rutgers University and a well-known translator. The magazine Hadassah called her poems "introspective and witty," and the book was hailed as "that rarest of miracles: a first book of poetry in which every poem is a gem" by the Newsletter of the Association of Jewish Libraries.

In 2016, Indiana University Press published the Comprehensive English-Yiddish Dictionary, which was co-edited by Schaechter-Viswanath and Dr. Paul Glasser. The dictionary, containing nearly 50,000 entries and 33,000 subentries, was the first of its kind in over half a century, and carried on the lexicographical work and legacy of her father, Mordkhe Schaechter.

Schaechter-Viswanath's intellectual pursuits have been widely varied: she earned degrees in Jewish literature, Russian language, nursing and health administration. She works as a clinical consultant in health care and remains active in Yiddish cultural endeavors. She lives in Teaneck, New Jersey, with her husband and three children, and practices Orthodox Judaism. Her children all speak Yiddish as well as their father's first language, Tamil. She is a member of the Jewish People's Philharmonic Chorus, conducted by her brother.

== Family ==
Schaechter-Viswanath is a member of a leading family in Yiddish language and cultural studies. Her father, Mordkhe Schaechter, was an influential linguist of the Yiddish language. Her aunt Beyle Schaechter-Gottesman is a poet and songwriter; sister Rukhl Schaechter is a journalist with the Yiddish Forward; sister Eydl Reznik teaches Yiddish and directed a Yiddish chorus among the ultra-Orthodox community in Tsfat, Israel; and brother Binyumen Schaechter is a Yiddish composer and performer. Schaechter-Viswanath and her siblings all maintain Yiddish-speaking homes. Her son, Arun “Arele” Schaechter-Viswanath, is the Yiddish translator of J. K. Rowling's Harry Potter series. His translation of Harry Potter and the Philosopher's Stone was first published in February 2020. Schaechter-Viswanath's daughter, Meena Viswanath, is one of the developers of the Yiddish course on Duolingo.

Schaechter-Viswanath's husband, P. V. Viswanath, is a professor of Finance at Pace University's Lubin School of Business. He came to the United States from Mumbai for graduate school, became interested in Judaism, and met the then Ms. Schaechter at a Yiddishist retreat in the Catskills.

== Bibliography ==
- Di Froyen: Conference Proceedings: Women and Yiddish, Tribute to the Past, Directions for the Future. New York: National Council of Jewish Women, New York Section, Jewish Women's Resource Center, 1997.
- Zucker, Sheva. Introduction to Plutsemdiker Regn by Gitl Schaechter-Viswanath. Tel Aviv: Israel Book, 2003.
