= Bortner =

Bortner or Börtner is a surname. Notable people with this surname include:

- Michael Bortner (born 1949), American judge and state representative
- Susan Schechter Bortner, American statistician

== See also ==
- Dick Bortner, fictional character in 1991 film Talent for the Game
- Lucas Bortner, fictional character in 2014 The Simpsons animated television episode "Luca$"
