= Schachtner =

Schachtner is a surname. Notable people with the surname include:

- Johann Andreas Schachtner (1731–1795), German musician and friend of Wolfgang Amadeus Mozart
- Michael Schachtner (born 1986), American basketball player
- Patty Schachtner (born 1960), American first responder and politician

== See also ==
- Schechter
