= Abraham Golomb =

Yiddish educator and lyricist

- Born: 1888; Lithuania
- Died: 1982 (aged 93–94); Los Angeles
- Occupations: Yiddish educator and lyricist

Abraham Golomb (1888 in Lithuania – 1982 in Los Angeles, USA; Yiddish אברהם יצחק גולומב) was a Yiddishist teacher and writer. He wrote many pedagogical articles and books, and also published, primarily in Yiddish, about his belief in the need for retaining Jewish distinctiveness in the Diaspora and the centrality of Hebrew and Yiddish as the languages of the Jewish people. His work has not been widely translated into English.

Golomb was affiliated with the Psychology and Education section of YIVO in Vilna, under the direction of by Leibush Lehrer, and was also active in the Kultur-lige. From 1921 to 1931, he was the director of the Vilna Teachers Seminary.

After a living in Palestine from 1932 to 1938, Golomb emigrated to Winnipeg, Canada, where he became principal of the Peretz School. In 1944 he moved to Mexico City, where for 20 years he ran the Yiddish schools. Finally, in 1964 he and his wife Rivke Savich Golomb moved to Los Angeles, California.

== Selected works ==
- Ṿi fun a fish iz a frosh geṿorn: zikhroynes̀ fun mayn ḳindheyṭ. (How a fish became a frog: memories of my childhood) Bialystok: Ferlag Ḳulṭur lige, 1921.
- Dos ershṭe mol in ṿald : zikhroynes̀ fun mayn ḳindheyṭ. (The first time in the forest: memories of my childhood) Bialystok: Ferlag Ḳulṭur lige, 1921.
- אייביקע וועגן פון אייביקן פאלק : עסייען / Eybiḳe ṿegn fun eybiḳn folḳ : eseyn (Eternal ways of eternal people: essays). Buenos Aires : Yoyvl-ḳomiṭeṭ, 1964.
- צווישן תקופות / [פון] א. גאלאמב Tsṿishn tḳufes̀. (Between epochs). Tel-Aviv: Y.L. Peretz, 1968.
