= Schechtel =

Schechtel (Russian: Ше́хтель) is a surname. Notable people with this surname include:

- Fyodor Schechtel (1859–1926), Russian architect and artist
- Sidney Schechtel (1917–2007), American writer

== See also ==
- Schechter, a surname
