= Paul Novick =

American Yiddish newspaper editor

- פסח נאוויק
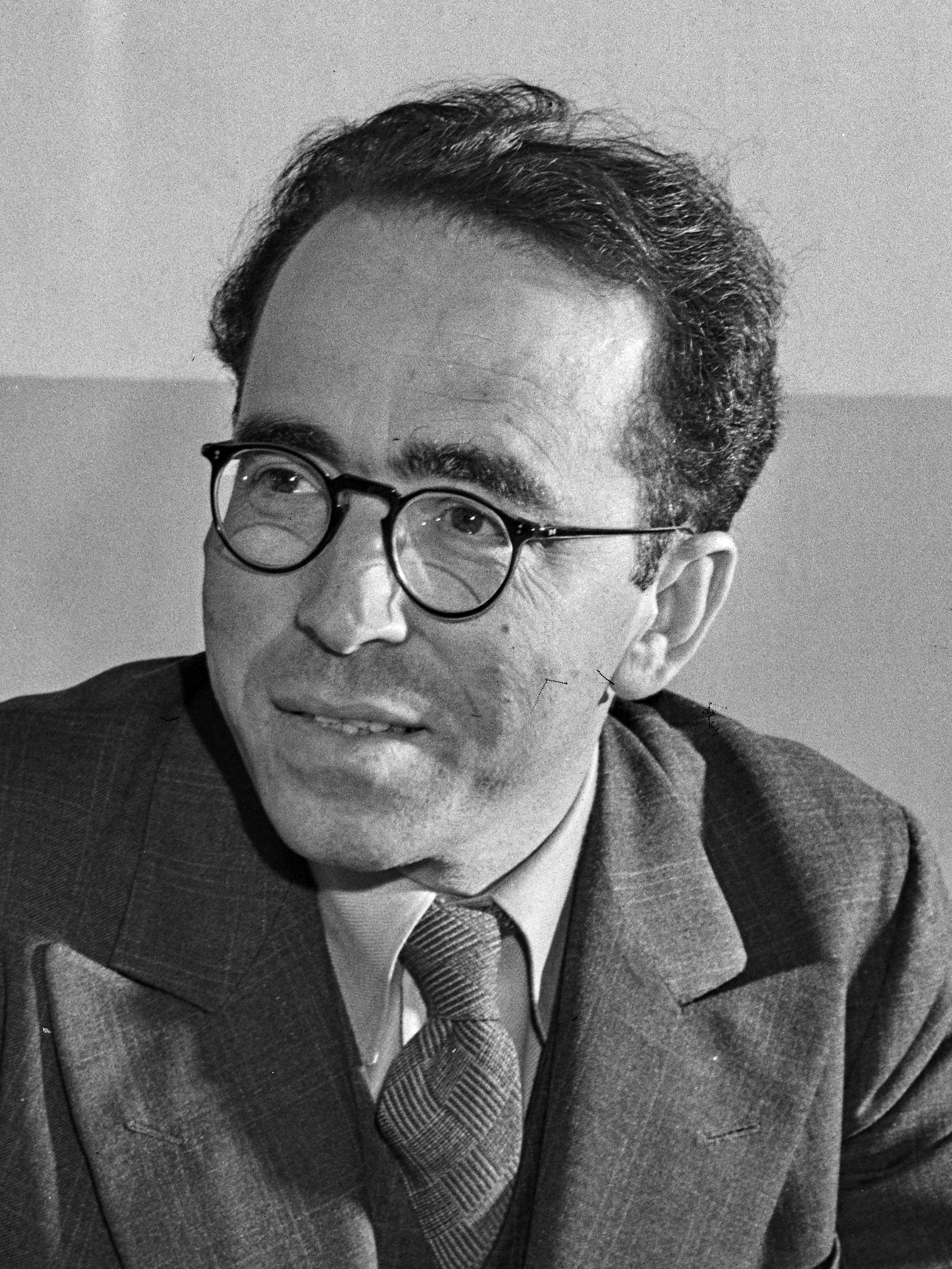
- Novick c. 1941
- Born: Pesakh Novick; September 7, 1891; Brest-Litovsk, Grodno Governorate, Russian Empire
- Died: August 21, 1989 (aged 97); Peekskill, New York, U.S.
- Occupations: Journalist; Editor; Translator; Political commentator
- Years active: 1915–1988
- Political party: Socialist (1913–1921); Communist (1921–1972)
- Other political affiliations: Bund (1907–1920)
- Spouse: Shirley Rabinowitz
- Children: Allan

Pesakh "Paul" Novick (Yiddish: פסח נאוויק; September 7, 1891 – August 21, 1989) was a Jewish American journalist, editor, translator and political commentator. Novick is best remembered as the long time editor-in-chief of the Communist Party Yiddish-language daily Morgen Freiheit (Morning Freedom) and of the Communist-affiliated English-language magazine Jewish Life. Novick was expelled from the Communist Party in 1972 for challenging Soviet foreign policy (specifically as it pertained to Czechoslovakia and Israel), and for allegedly supporting Zionism.

== Biography ==
=== Early years ===
Pesakh (later known as Paul) Novick was born on September 7, 1891 in Brest-Litovsk, Grodno Governorate, in the Russian Empire (present-day Brest, Belarus). His father was a shopkeeper and sent him to cheder and yeshiva to study under the Rabbi Chaim Soloveitchik. Novick left the yeshiva at 16 and joined the General Jewish Labor Bund in 1907. He worked as a machinist in Zurich, Switzerland, from 1910 to 1912 then came to New York City in 1913.

Novick soon became an official in the Jewish Socialist Federation and began writing for its weekly organ, Di Naye Velt (The New World), in 1915. Following the February Revolution, Novick returned to Russia and resumed his activity with the Bund, editing several Bundist papers such as Undzer shtime (Our Voice) in Vilna, succeeding Max Weinreich. During this time, Novick took a room in the residence of Jewish communal leader Zemach Shabad. All three men were forced to take refuge in Shabad's home during the Vilna pogrom in 1919. Novick immigrated to the United States permanently in October 1920, gaining citizenship in 1927. He resided in the Bronx.

=== Political career ===
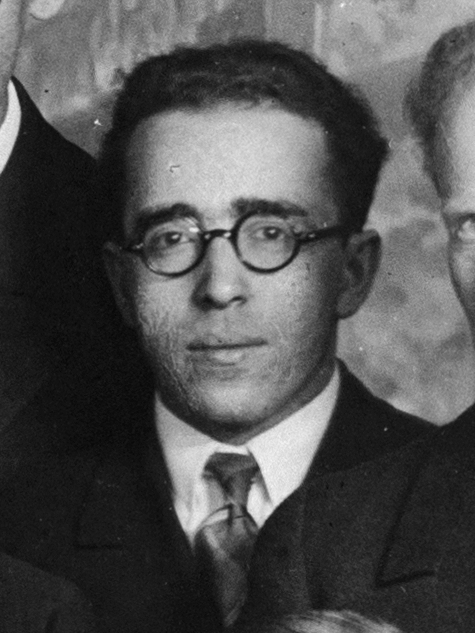
Novick c. 1922–1923

In America, Novick rejoined the JSF and briefly wrote for the Jewish Daily Forward from 1920 to 1921. He sided with the left wing of the JSF when it split from the Socialist Party of America in 1921. In April 1922, Novick, Moissaye Joseph Olgin, and several others founded the Morgen Freiheit, a Yiddish-language daily newspaper affiliated with the Communist Party USA. Novick served first as news editor, then as assistant editor, and finally as editor-in-chief after Olgin's death in 1939.

Novick was active in several other publications and organizations, including the International Workers Order, the Yidisher Kultur Farband, Jewish Currents, and Proletpen. He also wrote articles for the English-language Daily Worker, and was at one point its European correspondent. The publication billed him as "an authority on the situation in Palestine".

Novick (front row, eighth from right) and other staff members of the Morgen Freiheit hold up war bonds they've purchased, September 20, 1943

In 1953, at the height of the Second Red Scare, the United States Department of Justice announced that it would attempt to denaturalize Novick on the grounds that he "swore to false statements" during his 1927 citizenship proceedings. These threats persisted as late as 1955, but he ultimately retained his citizenship.

=== Expulsion from the Communist Party ===
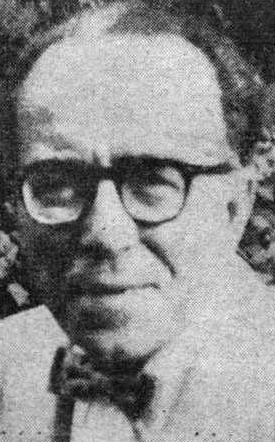
Novick c. 1961

From the beginning of his career until the 1950s, Novick had been a loyal adherent to the Communist Party line, even supporting the Arabs in the 1929 Palestine riots and the Molotov–Ribbentrop Pact in 1939. However, after Nikita Khrushchev gave his "Secret Speech" in 1956 denouncing the brutality of Joseph Stalin's regime, Novick began to drift away from the CPUSA. In 1957, the Freiheit was "officially declared free of Party control" and began to challenge the Communist Party line. Although it was still sympathetic to the Eastern Bloc, its ideology shifted towards that of democratic socialism.

Novick himself remained a member of the party and its central committee, but began to push for a stance more favorable to Israel, especially after the Six-Day War; he asserted that Israel was "acting in self-defence" in its aggression against Egypt during the conflict, and was the only dissenting vote against publishing a statement of support for Soviet-backed Egypt. He did, however, make a point to condemn "expansionists" like Moshe Dayan, Yigal Allon, and Menachem Begin. When the Communist Party of Israel (Maki) split in the mid-1960s, the CPUSA supported the anti-Zionist Rakah faction while Novick aligned himself with the opposing Mikunis-led faction. Although he never considered himself a Zionist, Novick abandoned his earlier anti-Zionism on the basis of Israel's "centrality" to the Jewish people.

In addition to his dissent on Israel, Novick opposed the Soviet invasion of Czechoslovakia in 1968 and charged the USSR with "habitual antisemitism." He repeatedly came under fire for going against the party line, and was accused by CPUSA members Hyman Lumer, Claude Lightfoot, and Jose Ristorucci of signing petitions that countered party policy, and of openly proclaiming himself a Zionist in both his personal life and in editorials for the Freiheit. Novick was expelled from the CPUSA in 1972, following further accusations of anti-Black racism and nationalism.

=== Later career ===
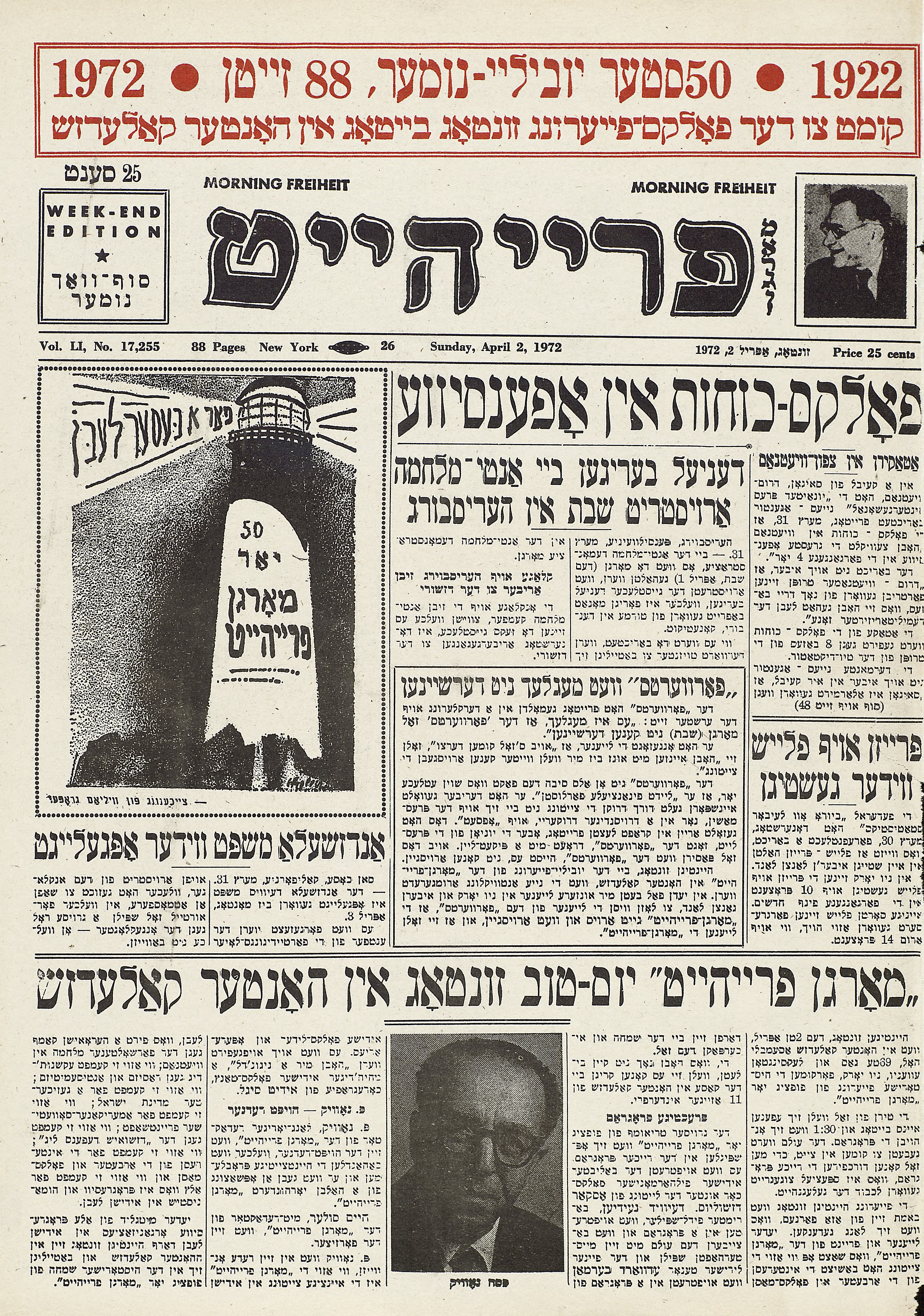
Novick on the front page of the Freiheit's 50th anniversary issue, April 2, 1972

Novick continued as editor of the Freiheit after his expulsion, using his position to criticize the Soviet invasion of Afghanistan and the ongoing persecution of Jews in the USSR. By the 1980s, the Freiheit had declined to a circulation of just 6,000 from a peak of 14,000 to 20,000 in the 1920s and 30s. It was forced to transition from a daily to a weekly, and its staff was reduced to six people, including Novick. Unable to sustain itself financially, the Freiheit finally ceased publication on September 11, 1988.

=== Death and legacy ===
Novick died of congestive heart failure and kidney deficiency on August 21, 1989, aged 97, at a hospital in Peekskill, New York. His funeral service at the Plaza Memorial Chapel in Manhattan attracted 300 mourners, during which eulogies were delivered by Morris U. Schappes and Itche Goldberg, amongst others. He was survived by his second wife Shirley, his son Allan, his brother Kopl, and a niece and nephews. Novick's wife, Shirley Novick (née Rabinowitz), was the subject of Red Shirley, a short documentary film produced in 2011 by New York City rock icon Lou Reed.

== Works ==
- "Decay of the Socialist Party." New Masses, July 10, 1934, pp. 8–11.
- "The Rise and Fall of Abraham Cahan." New Masses, Aug. 20, 1935, pp. 9–10.
- "The Socialist Housecleaning." New Masses, Sept. 7, 1937, pp. 15–16.
- "Peace by Understanding: A Communist Rejects the Partition of Palestine." New Masses, Aug. 9, 1938, pp. 8–10.
- "A Solution for Palestine," The Communist. Sept. 1938, pp. 785–796.
