= Red Shirley =

- Poster for Red Shirley premiere in Nyon, Switzerland, 2010.
- Directed by: Lou Reed
- Produced by: Lou Reed; Tom Sarig
- Starring: Shirley Novick; Lou Reed
- Cinematography: Ralph Gibson
- Music by: Metal Machine Trio
- Release date: April 20, 2010 (Visions du Réel Film Festival)
- Running time: 28 minutes
- Country: United States
- Language: English

Red Shirley is a short documentary film directed by Lou Reed. It tells the story of his cousin, Shirley Novick, living through World War I, fleeing Poland before World War II, and taking part in the March on Washington for Jobs and Freedom. The film was shot by photographer Ralph Gibson, and the soundtrack was recorded by Metal Machine Trio.

In 2011, Reed said there was a "great impetus" to create the film Red Shirley, given that a lot of information would be lost if he didn't. The film's world première was at the 2010 Visions du Réel festival in Nyon, Switzerland, before appearing in New York at the Jewish Film Festival. The trailer for the documentary featured a collection of photographs and a conversation between Reed and his cousin Novick. Novick's nickname is "Red Shirley", hence the title of the film. This was Lou Reed's final film before his death in 2013.

== Summary ==
Lou Reed interviews his cousin, Shirley Novick, on the eve of her 100th birthday. Novick recalls growing up in a small village in Poland during World War I; fleeing to the United States by way of Canada before World War II and losing her parents to the Nazis; toiling for 47 years in New York City's garment district, where she became a labor activist; reuniting with her sisters, who had emigrated to Palestine; and taking part in the March on Washington for Jobs and Freedom in 1963.

== Critical reception ==
Premiering in Switzerland in 2010, Red Shirley was screened at film festivals around the world, including the 20th annual New York Jewish Film Festival and the 2011 Sundance Film Festival, where it was well received. Sean Michaels of the Guardian described it as an "affectionate and moving portrait." Kurt Brokaw of the Independent magazine called it "a work both endearing and enduring." Dave Robson of Sound on Sight wrote, "These are the sorts of films that future historians will thank us for." The film will be included in the Jewish Museum's film collection.

== See also ==
- Paul Novick
- American Jewish community and the Civil Rights Movement
