= Sarah Reisen =

Belarusian-American Jewish poet

- Born: 1885; Koydenov, White Russia (Now Dzyarzhynsk, Belarus)
- Died: October 25, 1975 (aged 89–90); New York City
- Occupations: Writer, translator
- Writing career
- Pen name: Sarah Kalmens
- Language: English, Yiddish

Sarah Reisen (1885–1975; her name is sometimes transliterated as Sora Reyzen or Raizin) was a Belarusian-American Yiddish poet and translator.

== Early life ==
Reisen was born in 1885 to Kalmen Reisen and Kreyne Epstein. Kalmen was a writer, as were her two brothers, Abraham and Zalmen. At home, she learned Torah portions from her father, Hebrew from the rabbi's wife, German from her mother, and Russian from her teacher. Her mother died when Reisen was ten, after which she briefly lived in Vinitze and Mohilne. Reisen moved then to Minsk at the age of 14, where she worked as a seamstress and a Russian tutor, and continued her studies. Reisen got married in 1904 to writer David Kasel and had a son Moishe. This marriage ended in a divorce, however, and, after moving around for a few years, she immigrated to New York City in 1933.

== Career ==
Reisen's first work, a publication of a sketch in Russian as well as a translation of a work by I.L. Peretz was published when she was seventeen. She soon joined the Yiddish literary circle, writing sketches, short stories, and poems for various periodicals and publications such as Di Folkstzaytung, Der Veg, Der Fraynd, The Forward, Feder, and her brother's publication Eyropeyishe Literatur, sometimes under the pen name Sarah Kalmens.

Reisen is one of a number of women poets writing in Yiddish, many of whom were Litvaks and whom Dovid Katz acknowledges for their contribution to the establishment of Yiddish as a respected language for producing literary material.

Along with writing for publications, she wrote and performed for Yiddish Theater. Her translations into Yiddish include, among others, works by Tolstoy, Andreyev, Turgenev, and Pushkin. She is known for working on children's books and adapting works of Oscar Wilde for Yiddish schools.

Reisen died on October 25, 1975, in New York City.
