= Cécile Cerf =

French resistance member (1916–1973)

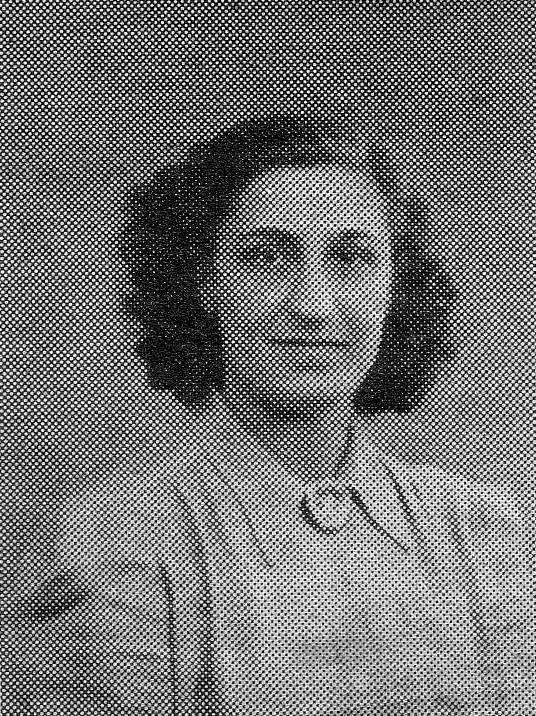
Cécile Cerf

Cécile Cerf (12 January 1916 – 29 December 1973) was a member of the French Resistance during World War II.

During World War II, Cerf played an active role in the Main-d'œuvre immigrée groups under the aegis of the FTP-MOI resistance movement. In the post-war period, she co-founded the Commission centrale de l'enfance devoted to taking care of orphans from the Holocaust.

== Biography ==
Cécile Cerf was born in the city of Vilna. At that time in Russia, the city was renamed Wilno on passing to Polish hands, and became Vilnius after the Second World War. Vilna was a major Jewish cultural centre: traditionalism and modernism, mysticism and marxism, Zionism and anti-Zionism co-existed. It was in this effervescent intellectual and artistic climate that Cécile Cerf performed her tumultuous studies. Elder daughter of Moshe Shalit, Cécile Cerf spoke several languages, and at the age of 14, without fear of the violent repression, she joined the student revolutionary action against the Polish military dictatorship.

In 1932, Cécile Cerf pursued her schooling in Paris. After a brief time at the Lycée Victor-Duruy, her political convictions drove her to abandon her studies in order to live an authentic working-class life. She married Marcel Cerf in 1934, became French, and opposed the rioters of 6 February 1934.

During the Second World War, Cécile Cerf's husband became a prisoner of war in Germany. Cécile Cerf was on her own bringing up a young child, born at the start of the war. Nonetheless in 1942 she joined the resistance against the Nazi occupation. In December 1942, she joined the ranks of the Francs-tireurs et partisans (FTPF), a grouping which subsumed the French Forces of the Interior, in the Paris region. From 1942 until the liberation, Cécile Cerf served the resistance continuously and doggedly, with growing and multiple responsibilities in French territory. At first she acted as a liaison agent. She participated in saving Jewish children, in finding lodging for the armed fighters of the FTPF, and in the supply of combat groups. She stood out particularly for her participation in the arms and supplies transports which allowed the realization of several operations, notably that of 17 January 1944 when a train carrying enemy troops was derailed near Bellay.

From August 1943 until May 1944, Cécile Cerf was recruited as part of the FTP-MOI management among the French resistance in the zone Nord. She was put in charge of developing women's resistance activity, including within immigrant communities (Polish, Italian, Spanish). During this period, she recruited many women who serves as liaison agents.

In late 1943, she set up an underground printing press at Châtenay-Malabry in the home of another woman resistance member. This press, of which she took leadership, ran until May 1944, editing and printing copies of many tracts and underground newspapers of the resistance Front national.

From May 1944, Cécile Cerf became the head of FTP-MOI in the zone Nord for the establishment of patriotic militias. She was specifically with the Paris region and the departments of l'Yonne and the Côte d'Or.

Cécile Cerf performed her missions on a bicycle, specifically transporting the templates for underground tracts to the departments which she visited. During the same period, she performed missions in the Saône et Loire, organising the resistance among women by aiding the Maquis.

After the war, Cécile Cerf co-founded the Commission Centrale de l'Enfance along with six other resistance members from the Union des juifs pour la Résistance et l'Entraide (UJRE) associated with the MNCR. Children's houses and fosters for teenagers were set up to receive the orphans who had escaped the genocide. Pedagogues, educators, leaders and inspectors were trained to deal with accepting the children. Cécile Cerf was the first administrator of the newspaper Droit et Liberté. Named editorial secretary of the progressive Yiddish daily Naie Presse (New Press), her goal was clear: the preservation of a language and culture, and the defense of republican freedoms. As manager of the Renouveau bookshop, she regularly held meeting of writers from all backgrounds to animate her encounters with the readership.

In 1959, Cécile Cerf organised a soirée to honour the Yiddish writer Sholem Aleichem at the Sorbonne, and a large-scale conference at UNESCO at the exhibition in honour of the Aleichem's centenary. Cécile Cerf translated many novels by both classical and modern Yiddish authors totally unknown to the French public for the Presse Nouvelle Hebdomadaire (PNH). She also translated poetic texts from popular melodies.

Cécile Cerf strove for dialogue between cultures, for an independent Algeria, against the wars in Indochina and Vietnam, and for the defense of the oppressed, wherever they were.

== Publications by Cécile Cerf ==
- Regards sur la littérature yidich (Note the original French spelling "Yidich" is now used less in France than the English spelling "Yiddish".), Ed. Académie d'Histoire, 1974
- Chants yiddish de Russie, Translation to French by Cécile Cerf. Ed. Le Chant du Monde

== Bibliography ==
- Simon Cukier, Dominique Decèze, David Diamant, Michel Grojnowski, Juifs révolutionnaires, une page d'histoire du yidichland en France (Jewish revolutionaries, a historical page on Yiddishland in France), Messidor, Éditions Sociales, 1987, p. 204, 210, 243
- Jacques Ravine, La Résistance organisée des Juifs en France (1940–1944) (Organized resistance of the Jews in France), Julliard, 1973, p. 48
- Stéphane Courtois, Denis Peschanski, Adam Rayski, Le sang de l'étranger, les immigrés de la M.O.I. dans la Résistance (The foreigner's blood, the immigrants of the MOI in the resistance), Fayard 1989, p. 288
