= Mordkhe Schaechter =

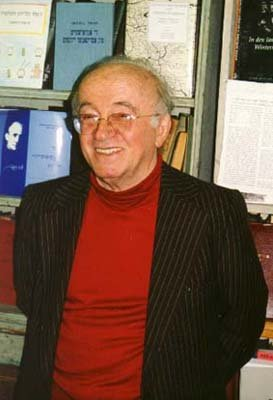
- Born: Itsye Mordkhe Schaechter; December 1, 1927; Czernowitz, Bukovina, Kingdom of Romania
- Died: February 15, 2007 (aged 79)
- Occupations: Linguist, writer, and educator

Itsye Mordkhe Schaechter (Yiddish: איציע מרדכי שעכטער; December 1, 1927 – February 15, 2007) was a leading Yiddish linguist, writer, and educator who spent a lifetime studying, standardizing and teaching the language.

Schaechter, whose passion for Yiddish dated to his boyhood in Romania, dedicated his life to reclaiming Yiddish as a living language for the descendants of its first speakers, the Ashkenazic Jewry of central and eastern Europe. He was also the third editor of Afn Shvel (1957–2004), a Yiddish magazine.

== In Europe ==
He was born Itsye Mordkhe Schaechter in the then-Romanian town of Tshernovits (in Yiddish; known in German as Czernowitz, in Romanian as Cernăuţi, and in Ukrainian as Chernivtsi). He became fascinated with Yiddish as a student, and he decided to study linguistics at the University of Bucharest. He earned his doctorate in Linguistics at the University of Vienna in 1951.

From 1947 to 1951, Schaechter lived in the Arzbergerstrasse Displaced persons (DP) camp in Vienna. During this period he worked for the YIVO Institute for Jewish Research, as a zamler, or collector, for the YIVO Archives.

== In the United States ==
When Schaechter came to the United States in 1951, he served in military intelligence in the United States Army during the Korean War. Following this, he resumed his association with YIVO and began teaching and writing. He continued his work as a bibliographer and proofreader (1954–1956), and then, from the 1970s until 1986, he was a bibliographer, proofreader, and finally editor of YIVO's Yiddishe Shprakh, a journal devoted to the pronunciation, grammar and vocabulary of Standard Yiddish. He also founded the Committee for the Implementation of the Standardized Yiddish Orthography in 1958.

From 1981 until his retirement in 1993, he was Senior Lecturer in Yiddish Studies at Columbia University in New York. Besides this, he also taught Yiddish language in the intensive Uriel Weinreich Program in Yiddish Language, Literature & Culture, a joint project of YIVO and Columbia University, since its inception in 1968 until 2002. He has also taught Yiddish courses at the Jewish Theological Seminary of America (1960–1962), Jewish Teacher's Seminary-Herzliah (1962–1978) and Yeshiva University (1968–1973) and has instructed many distinguished scholars and professors of Yiddish language, literature and Jewish history throughout the world.

In the 1980s, he was associate editor of The Great Dictionary of the Yiddish Language and, from 1961 to 1972, he was associate editor of The Language and Culture Atlas of Ashkenazic Jewry.

== Achievements ==
Schaechter received the Itzik Manger Prize, the most prestigious Yiddish literary award, in 1994; the Khayim Zhitlowsky Award in 1984; and the Osher Schuchinsky Award from the World Congress for Jewish Culture in 1986.

He was the founder of the League for Yiddish and served as its executive director from the inception of the organization in 1979 until his retirement in 2004. In 1964 he founded Yugntruf – Youth for Yiddish together with several of his students, and he served as its official advisor until 1974. Following his death, his daughter Gitl Schaechter-Viswanath and former student and colleague Paul Glasser published the Comprehensive English Yiddish Dictionary based on his lexical research.

== Family ==
His mother, Lifshe Schaechter-Widman, wrote a memoir, Durkhgelebt a Velt (A Full Life) in 1973, and served as a resource for folksong researchers with her recording Az Di Furst Avek (When You Go Away).

His sister Beyle Schaechter-Gottesman was a renowned Yiddish poet and songwriter.

Schaechter's daughter Rukhl Schaechter is the editor of the Yiddish edition of The Forward. His daughter Gitl Schaechter-Viswanath is a Yiddish-language poet and edited the Comprehensive English-Yiddish Dictionary. His daughter Eydl Reznik teaches Yiddish among the ultra-Orthodox community in Tsfat, Israel. His son, Binyumen Schaechter, is the music director and choral arranger for the Yiddish Philharmonic Chorus.

His nephew Itzik Gottesman is a contributor to The Forward and the online journal In Geveb, and a scholar of Yiddish folklore.

His grandson Naftali Schaechter Ejdelman helped found Yiddish Farm, which facilitates Yiddish-immersion programs on an organic farm in Goshen, NY.

His grandson Arun Schaechter Viswanath is the Yiddish translator of Harry Potter and Pippi Longstocking.

== Death ==
He died on February 15, 2007, after a long illness following a stroke in the summer of 2002.

== Publications ==
- Di Geviksn-Velt in Yidish ["Plant Names in Yiddish: A Handbook of Botanical Terminology"]. New York: League for Yiddish/YIVO Institute for Jewish Research, 2005.
- Yiddish II: An Intermediate and Advanced Textbook. Fourth Edition. New York: League for Yiddish, 2004.
- Fun Folkshprakh tsu Kulturshprakh [The History of the Standardized Yiddish Spelling], New York: League for Yiddish/YIVO, 1999.
- Kurs Fun Yidisher Ortografye [A Course of the Yiddish Orthography], 4th ed. New York: League for Yiddish, 1996.
- Trogn, Hobn un Friyike Kinder-yorn [Pregnancy, Childbirth and Early Childhood]. New York: League for Yiddish, 1991.
- English-Yidish Verterbikhl Fun Akademisher Terminologye [English-Yiddish Dictionary of Academic Terminology]. New York: League for Yiddish, 1988.
- Laytish Mame-Loshn [Authentic Yiddish]. New York: League for Yiddish, 1986.
- Mit A Gutn Apetit! Reshime Gastronomishe Terminen Bon Appétit! [Yiddish Gastronomic Terminology]. New York-Hamden-Philadelphia: Foundation for a Living Yiddish, 1976.
- Elyokum Tsunzers Verk: Kritishe Oysgabe, [The Works of Elyokum Zunser: A critical edition]. New York: YIVO Institute for Jewish Research, [2 volumes], 1964.
- Guide to the Standardized Yiddish Orthography. YIVO, 1961.
- Aktionen im Jiddischen: Ein sprachwissenschaftlicher Beitrag zur Bedeutungslehre des Verbums. Phil. Diss. Vienna 1951.
