= Judah Leib Cahan =

Judah Leib Cahan (Yiddish: יהודה לייב כהן ) (1881 in Vilna, Lithuania – 1937 in New York City), more commonly known as Y.L. Cahan, was a Yiddish folklorist.

== Biography ==
Born in Vilna, Cahan moved as a youth to Warsaw, where he frequently attended Saturday night folksong recitals at the home of writer I. L. Peretz. After a brief stint in London, he moved to New York in 1904, and continued collecting folklore among the Yiddish-speaking Jews of New York. In 1925, Cahan helped organize the American branch of the YIVO, and was selected to lead its Folklore Committee. He was instrumental in expanding the folklore collection efforts of YIVO, and in 1930 returned to Vilna to train young scholars. After his death, YIVO planned to publish all of his works (collections of folk songs and folktales, and theoretical works), but only the folktales volume was published before the remaining material was destroyed during World War II.
