= Jonathan Brent =

American academic, author, and publisher

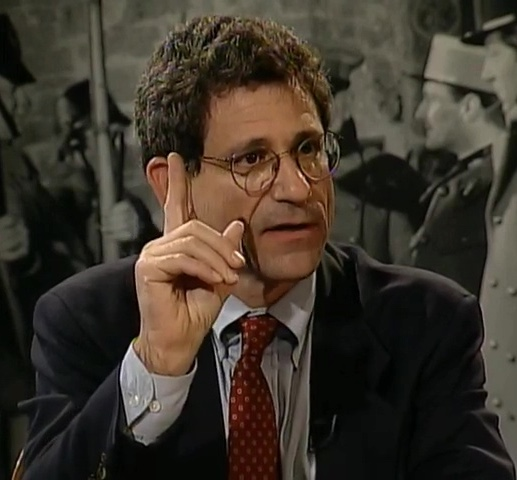
- Brent on CUNY TV's City Cinematheque, 1998
- Born: December 2, 1949 (age 76)
- Education: University of Chicago
- Employer(s): YIVO, Bard College
- Notable work: Annals of Communism series

Jonathan Brent (born 1949) is an American academic, author, historian and publisher. As a publisher, he is the director of the Annals of Communism series, which he founded in 1992. He is currently the CEO and executive director of the YIVO Institute for Jewish Research, as well as Visiting Alger Hiss Professor of History and Literature at Bard College.

== Biography ==
Jonathan Brent was born on December 2, 1949, to bookstore-owning parents Stuart and Jeanette Brent, a pianist; Jeanette died in 1954. He received a B.A. from Columbia University, and an M.A. and Ph.D. in English literature from the University of Chicago. He is a writer, publisher, and teacher who has lectured around the world on subjects of Soviet and modern Jewish history. His books have been translated into multiple languages.

From 1981-1991, Brent was editor-in-chief and director of the Northwestern University Press, where he established the series in East European and Russian literature. He served as editorial director and associate director of the Yale University Press from 1991-2009. In 1981, Brent founded the literary magazine Formations, which specialized in East European writing and thought.

He has taught courses in history and literature as the visiting Alger Hiss Professor of History and Literature at Bard College since 2004. In 2009, the YIVO Institute for Jewish Research named him its executive director and CEO. In 2014, with the cooperation of the government of the Republic of Lithuania Brent established the landmark Edward Blank YIVO Vilna Online Collections project at The YIVO Institute to preserve and digitize approximately 2.5 million documents and 12,200 books representing 500 years of Jewish history in Eastern Europe and Russia. In 2019, Brent received the Cross of the Knight of the Order of Merits to Lithuania for the "promotion of cooperation between Lithuania and YIVO and for the preservation of pre-War Jewish archives in Lithuania (United States of America)."

== Works ==
=== Books published ===
- The History of the Yiddish Language
- The YIVO Encyclopedia of Jews in Eastern Europe
- The New Yiddish Library
- The Posen Library of Jewish Culture and Civilization
- The Last Days of the Jerusalem of Lithuania, by Herman Kruk

=== Books authored ===
- Stalin's Last Crime
- Inside the Stalin Archives plus Book Interview at the Pritzker Military Museum & Library on November 12, 2008
