= Beyle Schaechter-Gottesman =

Yiddish poet and songwriter (1920–2013)

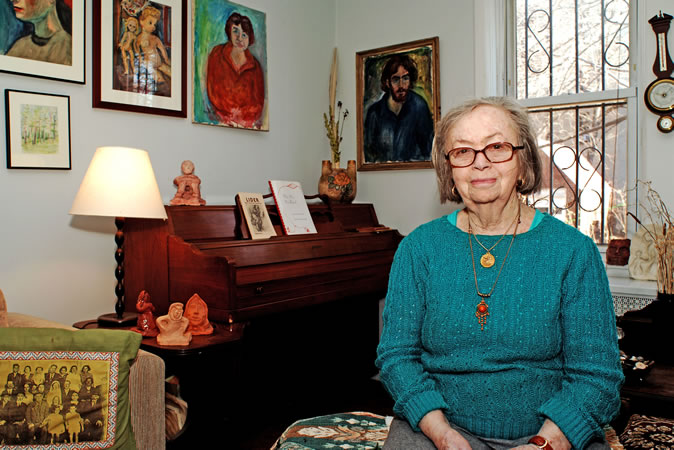
Schaechter-Gottesman in 2005

Beyle (or Bella) "Beyltse" Schaechter-Gottesman (August 7, 1920 – November 28, 2013) was a Yiddish poet and songwriter.

== Biography ==
She was born in Vienna into an Eastern-European, Yiddish-speaking family; her family left for Czernowitz, Ukraine (then Cernăuți, Romania) and settled there when Schaechter-Gottesman was a young child. She was brought up in a multi-lingual environment that included Yiddish, German, Romanian, and Ukrainian; she also studied French and Latin at school. They were a singing family and her mother, Lifshe Schaechter, was known for her wide folk repertoire. Schaechter-Gottesman was sent to Vienna for art lessons, but was forced to return to Czernowitz when the Germans invaded Austria in 1938. In 1941 she married a medical doctor, Jonas (Yoyne) Gottesman, and together they lived out the war in the Czernowitz ghetto, along with her mother and several other family members.

After the war, Schaechter-Gottesman lived several years in Vienna, where her husband had a chief position ("Chefarzt") in the DP camps in the area. Their daughter Taube was born there in 1950; the family moved to New York in 1951, where the Gottesmans had two other children, Hyam and Itzik. In New York the Gottesmans took part in an experimental Yiddish community in the Bronx, centered on Bainbridge Avenue. There a half-dozen Yiddish-speaking families bought adjacent houses and reinvigorated the existing Sholem Aleichem Yiddish School. Schaechter-Gottesman became an important member of this community, writing classroom materials, plays and songs for the school as well as editing a magazine for children, ”קינדער־זשורנאַל„ ("Kinderzhurnal") and a magazine of children's writings, ”ענגע־בענגע„ ("Enge-benge").

Schaechter-Gottesman's first book of poetry, ”מיר פֿאָרן„ ("Mir Forn", We’re Travelling) appeared in 1963. Her books, eight in total, have appeared regularly since then. They include poetry for adults, children's books and song books. She has recorded three CDs of her songs and one recording of folk songs. Her work does not revolve around a single theme but ranges widely from Eastern European subjects to contemporary New York, and from lighthearted children's fare to such sombre reflections as "Di Balade Funem Elftn September" (The Ballad of September 11). Her best-known single work is "Harbstlid" (Autumn Song). Schaechter-Gottesman's songs have been performed by Theodore Bikel, Adrienne Cooper, Theresa Tova, Lucette van den Berg, Susan Leviton, Michael Alpert, Lorin Sklamberg, Sharon Jan Bernstein, Fabian Schnedler, Massel-Tov and others. A song written for her nephew, "Binyumele’s Bar Mitsve", was adapted by Adrienne Cooper for her daughter as "Sorele’s Bas Mitsve" and was recorded on the CD Mikveh.

Schaechter-Gottesman served as a resource for researchers of both Yiddish folk and art music. She has been recorded and interviewed numerous times and participated in such cultural events as KlezKamp, KlezKanada, Buffalo on the Roof, Ashkenaz Festival, and Weimar KlezmerWochen. "Beyle Schaechter-Gottesman: Song of Autumn", a 72-minute film by Josh Waletsky, was released summer 2007 as part of the League for Yiddish's Series "Worlds Within a World: Conversations with Yiddish Writers". A new collection of her poetry, דער צוויט פֿון טעג ("Der tsvit fun teg", "The Blossom of Days") was released in the autumn of 2007.

Schaechter-Gottesman died November 28, 2013, in her home in the Bronx, aged 93.

== Awards and honors ==
In 1998 Schaechter-Gottesman was inducted into the People's Hall of Fame at City Lore in New York.

She was a recipient of a 2005 National Heritage Fellowship awarded by the National Endowment for the Arts, which is the United States government's highest honor in the folk and traditional arts. She was the first to receive this honor for work in Yiddish culture.

== Family ==
The entire Schaechter-Gottesman family has been productive in the field of Yiddish culture. Her mother, Lifshe Schaechter-Widman, wrote a memoir, "Durkhgelebt a Velt" (A Full Life) in 1973, as well as serving as an informant for folk song researchers with her recording "Az Di Furst Avek" (When You Go Away). Her brother, Mordkhe Schaechter, was the world's leading Yiddish linguist. Her son, Itzik Gottesman, is a scholar of Yiddish folklore. Her niece, Gitl Schaechter-Viswanath is also a Yiddish poet; nephew Binyumen Schaechter is a composer and musical director in Yiddish and English; and niece Rukhl Schaechter is the editor of the Yiddish edition of The Forward. Her granddaughter, Esther Gottesman, teaches children Yiddish and sings on Schaechter-Gottesman's most recent release, "Fli mayn flishlang" (Fly, Fly My Kite).
