= Yugntruf =

Yugntruf – Youth for Yiddish (יוגנטרוף — יוגנט פֿאַר ייִדיש) is an organization of young Yiddish-speaking adults that is dedicated to the spread of the Yiddish language through various programs and events. It was founded by David Roskies, Gabi Trunk and Faye Ran under the guidance of the late Dr. Mordkhe Schaechter in 1964.

== Name ==
Yugntruf (יוגנטרוף) means “call of [the] youth” and “call to youth”.

It combines the words yugnt (יוגנט, “youth; the young”) and ruf (רוף, “call”, cognate of German Ruf).

== Activities ==
It hosts events such as

- the Yidish-Tog (“Yiddish Day”), a day in New York in which programs are run in Yiddish.
- the Svive Project, in which groups of Yiddish speakers come together to read and discuss in Yiddish. Svive (סבֿיבֿה) means “environment”.
- the week-long Yidish-Vokh (“Yiddish Week”) retreat, held in Copake, New York, in which participants spend an entire week conversing completely in Yiddish.

In addition, Yugntruf sponsors a literary magazine as well as the publishing of books for children in Yiddish. Many members of Yugntruf have decided to raise their children as Yiddish speakers.

== External reference ==
- Official website
