= Binyumen Schaechter =

Binyumen Schaechter (born 1963) is a conductor, music director, composer, arranger, solo performer, and piano accompanist in the world of Yiddish music. He also lectures on topics related to Yiddish music, language, and culture. He is a composer (known as Ben Schaechter) in the world of American musical theater and cabaret, and his songs are performed in venues worldwide. He has been music director of The Yiddish Philharmonic Chorus since 1995.

== Early years ==
The youngest of four children, Schaechter was born in the East New York section of Brooklyn, NY. His father was the Yiddish linguist Mordkhe Schaechter. His mother, Charlotte (née Saffian), was born in Brooklyn and grew up in the Bronx.

In 1966, the Schaechter family moved to the Norwood Heights section of the Bronx.

Schaechter attended the High School of Music and Art (now LaGuardia High School), Columbia University, and the Manhattan School of Music. Trained as a classical composer and pianist, he studied piano at the Hebrew Arts School for Music and Dance (now the Lucy Moses School) with Natan Brand and composition privately with Miriam Gideon and John Corigliano.

He was accepted into the BMI Musical Theater Workshop, where he formed his first collaborations with librettists and lyricists. His work, with Stephen Schwartz as one of his mentors, was selected for development by ASCAP, the Dramatists’s Guild, and the prestigious Eugene O’Neill National Musical Theater Conference (1992).

== Musical work ==
His Off-Broadway music includes songs in That’s Life! (an Outer Critics Circle nominee), Too Jewish? (Drama Desk, Outer Critics Circle nominee) and Double Identity His revue It Helps to Sing About It: Songs of Ben Schaechter and Dan Kael won the 2018 ASCAP-Bistro Outstanding Revue Award.

Schaechter has created and performed several Yiddish musical shows, some featuring him as a solo performer and others featuring his actor-singer daughters, Reyna and Temma (known together as Di Shekhter-tekhter). As their music director and piano accompanist, he traveled with the duo to Canada, Brazil, France, Israel, and Australia. A documentary concert video, When Our Bubbas and Zeydas Were Young: The Schaechter Sisters on Stage, was released on DVD in 2012 by Ergo Media. The video, directed by Academy Award-nominated documentary film director Josh Waletzky, was a featured selection in film, theater, and music festivals.

Schaechter is music director and conductor of the acclaimed Yiddish Philharmonic Chorus (formerly the Jewish People's Philharmonic Chorus), a 40-voice SATB intergenerational ensemble with an exclusively Yiddish repertoire. Schaechter created most of the arrangements and popular song translations in the chorus’s repertoire.

== As actor, translator, and lecturer ==
Most of Schaechter’s work focuses on the Yiddish language. As an actor, he was featured in Anna Deveare Smith's one-woman show at Carnegie Hall as the "simultaneous" on-stage Yiddish translator for several of her monologues. He provided the Yiddish translation for the original DVD version of The Life and Times of Hank Greenberg, the first-ever film with an option of Yiddish subtitle translations.

For many years, Schaechter served as coordinator for Yidish-vokh, an ongoing annual week-long all-Yiddish summer retreat sponsored by Yugntruf Youth for Yiddish – an organization co-founded in 1964 by his father to promote Yiddish as an active, spoken language.

== Family ==
Schaechter's father, Mordkhe Schaechter, was an influential Yiddish linguist who wrote and edited topical dictionaries, textbooks, and many magazine and journal articles in Yiddish and about Yiddish. His mother, Charlotte (Charne), was a piano accompanist to Yiddish singers. His aunt, Beyle Schaechter-Gottesman, was a Yiddish poet and songwriter.

His cousin Itzik Gottesman, former associate editor of the Forverts and the Tsukunft, is a scholar of Yiddish folklore. His sister Rukhl Schaechter, current editor of the Forverts, hosts the publication’s online Yiddish cooking program Est gezunterheyt! and is creator and host of its online Yiddish Word of the Day. His sister Gitl Schaechter-Viswanath is a Yiddish poet and co-editor of the Comprehensive English-Yiddish Dictionary. She is board chair of League for Yiddish, where she produces Verter fun der Vokh (Words of the Week), a series providing subscribers with Yiddish translations of timely words and phrases.

His niece Meena Viswanath is a developer of the Duolingo Yiddish course. His nephew Arun Schaechter Viswanath translated the Yiddish versions of Harry Potter and the Philosopher's Stone (Harry Potter un der filosofisher shteyn), Harry Potter and the Chamber of Secrets, (Harry Potter un di kamer fun soydes) and Pippi Longstocking (Pipi Langshtrimp).

== Works ==
- Naked Boys Singing
- Ball Games (produced in Dallas, Texas)
- Dinner at Eight (BMI's Jerry Bock Award)
- Double Identity
- From Kinehora to Coney Island
- Gay 90s Musical (produced in L.A. and elsewhere)
- Hangin' Out (sequel to Naked Boys Singing, produced in L.A.)
- Our Zeydas and Bubbas As Children
- Out of the Blue
- Pets! (Dramatic Publishing)
- Pripetshik Sings Yiddish! (DVD, Ergo Media, distributor)
- That's Life! (nominee, Outer Critics Circle Award)
- The Shtetl Comes to Life
- The Wild Swans (ASCAP's Bernice Cohen Award; selected, Eugene O'Neill National Music Theatre Conference)
- Too Jewish? (nominee: Drama Desk Award, Outer Critics Circle Awards)
- When Our Bubbas and Zeydas Were Young: The Schaechter Sisters on Stage (DVD, Ergo Media, distributor)
- Who Says Yiddish Songs Aren't Funny?
- Yiddish Top Khay – Singalong Countdown of the 18 Most Sung Yiddish Songs
- Provided the translations for a DVD with Yiddish subtitles, The Life And Times Of Hank Greenberg.
