= Zalman Reisen =

Russian lexicographer and literary historian

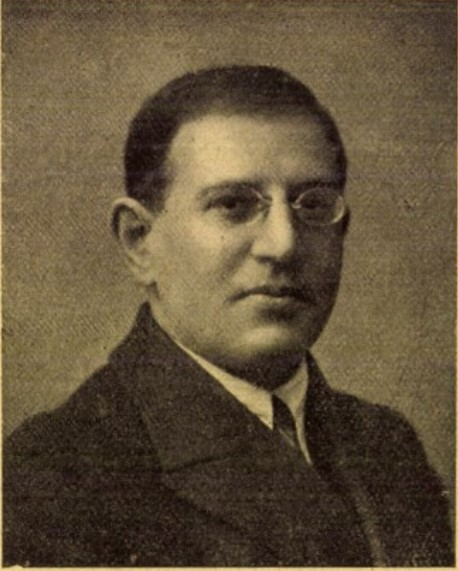
- Reisen in 1925
- Born: 6 October 1887; Koydenev, Russian Empire (now in Belarus)
- Died: 1941 (aged 53–54)
- Other names: Zalmen, Rejzen, Reyzen
- Known for: Founding YIVO, editing the Leksikon fun der yidisher literatur, prese, un filologye (Vilna, 1926-1929)

Zalman Reisen (Yiddish: זלמן רײזען; 6 October 1887 – 1941), sometimes spelled Zalman Reyzen, was a lexicographer and literary historian of Yiddish literature.

== Early life ==
Reisen was born in Koydenev (now known as Dzyarzhynsk) in Minsk Governorate (in present-day Belarus) in 1887 to parents interested in the Jewish Enlightenment, or Haskalah. His father wrote poems in Hebrew and Yiddish. His brother, Avrom Reyzen, was a noted Yiddish author and poet. His sister, Sarah Reisen, was also active in Yiddish culture, particularly the Yiddish Writers and Journalists Union of Vilna. He was educated at home, at several different cheders in the area, and attended a Russian state school in Minsk. In 1915, he moved to Vilna, where he would become an active part of the Yiddish intellectual scene as a writer and publisher.

== Work ==
In 1914, Reisen began to work for the Fraind newspaper in Warsaw. From 1916 to 1918 he was an editor for the Letzte Naies in Vilna, and from 1919 he worked for the Wilner Tog. After founder Shmuel Niger left for America, Reisen took over as chief editor and developed the paper into an important forum for discussion of cultural and societal questions of Judaism.

== Leksikon ==
Reisen's most notable achievement was the publication of the Leksikon fun der yidisher literatur, prese, un filologye, (Vilna: 1926–1929). This reference work centralized biographical and bibliographical information on Yiddish writers, providing an invaluable resource to scholars. He gathered information through an ambitious campaign of questionnaires published in newspapers and through word of mouth, in an era of unreliable communication. He continuously refined and improved his work, including more and more writers and improving the accuracy of the information through the years. This work served as the basis for the Leksikon fun der nayer yidisher literatur, which remains one of the definitive reference works in the field.

== YIVO ==
In February 1925, Reisen organized a conference with Max Weinreich to discuss Nochum Shtif's recent call for a Yiddish institute of higher education. The conference enthusiastically endorsed the idea, and that date is generally accepted as the founding moment of YIVO. Reisen would remain active in the organization, acting as an editor of its scholarly journal, the YIVO-bleter, from 1931 to 1939, and mentoring students in its Aspirantur program, which provided advanced graduate training to students of Jewish studies. He traveled to the United States in 1930 and to Argentina in 1932 to raise money and support for the organization.

== Fate ==
Despite being pro-Soviet in inclination, he was arrested by the Soviet occupiers in Autumn of 1939, shortly after the Soviet Union had invaded Poland and Lithuania as a result of the Molotov–Ribbentrop Pact. His fate after this point was unknown, though it was claimed that he was shot by the Soviets in 1941.
