= Herman Kruk =

- Born: 19 May 1897; Płock, Poland
- Died: 18 September 1944 (aged 47); KZ Lagedi, Estonia
- Writing career
- Notable works: The Last Days of the Jerusalem of Lithuania: Chronicles from the Vilna Ghetto and the Camps 1939-1944

Herman Kruk (Yiddish: הערשל קרוק) (19 May 1897-18 September 1944) was a Polish-Jewish librarian and Bundist activist who kept a diary recording his experiences in the Vilna Ghetto during World War II.

== Life ==
Kruk fled Warsaw and relocated to Vilna at the outbreak of the Invasion of Poland. While confined to the Vilna Ghetto, he organized and oversaw the creation and operation of a library in the Ghetto. He also played an active role in several of the ghetto's social welfare and cultural organizations.

Kruk continued chronicling his experiences after he was transferred to the Klooga concentration camp. The last entry was made on September 17, 1944, when he buried his diaries inside the camp at KZ Lagedi in Estonia. The following day, he and almost all the other prisoners were forced to carry logs to a pile, spread them in a layer, lie down naked on them so they could be executed and burned in a massive pyre. The Red Army arrived the following day to find the aftermath.

His diary was published posthumously in 1961 by YIVO in original Yiddish (Yiddish: טאָגבוך פֿון ווילנער געטאָ). An expanded English translation, The Last Days of the Jerusalem of Lithuania: Chronicles from the Vilna Ghetto and the Camps 1939-1944, was published in 2002 (ISBN 0300044941).

He is one of the main characters in Joshua Sobol's play Ghetto.

== See also ==
- List of Holocaust diarists
- List of diarists
- List of posthumous publications of Holocaust victims
- The Holocaust in Estonia
