= Undzer shtime (Vilna) =

Lithuanian World War 1 Newspaper

Undzer shtime (Yiddish: אונדזער שטימע, 'Our Voice') was a Yiddish language newspaper published in Vilna in 1918–1920. It was published monthly from August to November 1918, but became a daily on December 6, 1918, as the German army was retreating out of the city. The newspaper was the organ of the Lithuania Regional Committee of the General Jewish Labour Bund in Lithuania, Poland and Russia. Max Weinreich was the editor of Undzer shtime from December 1918 until mid-May 1919. He was succeeded by Paul Novick.

There was tension between the Lithuania Regional Committee of the Bund and the leftist-dominated Vilna City Committee of the Bund. The Vilna Committee demanded to get control of Undzer shtime at a general Bundist meeting held on January 15, 1919 – a decision that had 68 votes in favour and 63 votes against. The Regional Committee did not comply with this demand, at first, but eventually the Vilna Committee came to dominate the editorial line by April 7, 1919.

The publication of the newspaper was discontinued, as the city was seized by Polish troops. The last issue was published on April 18, 1919. A total of 99 issues of Undzer shtime were published during this period. Undzer shtime was relaunched when the city was again taken by the Red Army in July 1920.
