= Rukhl Schaechter =

Editor of the Yiddish-language newspaper Forverts (b. 1957)

- Born: 1957 (age 68–69)
- Education: Barnard College (BA); Jewish Teachers Seminary-Herzliya (BA); Bank Street College of Education (MA)
- Occupation: Editor of the Yiddish Forverts
- Children: 3
- Father: Mordkhe Schaechter

Rukhl Schaechter (born 1957) is the editor of the Yiddish Forverts, one of the two remaining Yiddish newspapers outside the Hasidic Jewish world (the other being Birobidzhaner Shtern in Russia, which contains 2-4 weekly printed pages in Yiddish, while the Forverts is a daily online only publication). She is the first woman, the first person born in the United States, and likely the first Sabbath observant Jew to hold that position.

== Early life and education ==
Schaechter comes from a long line of Yiddishists as part of the Schaechter-Gottesman family: her father, Mordkhe Schaechter, was a Yiddish linguist who devoted his life to studying and teaching the language in the United States, while her aunt was Yiddish poet and songwriter Beyle Schaechter-Gottesman. She was raised in The Bronx. She completed a bachelor's degree in psychology at Barnard College in 1979,, and then studied at Jewish Teachers Seminary in Herzliya and Bank Street College of Education. She became an Orthodox Jew as an adult.

== Career ==
Schaechter was working as a Yiddish teacher at a Jewish school in New York—and a prizewinning writer of Yiddish short stories and songs—when she was recruited to join Forverts as reporter in 1998. In 2016, she was named editor of the paper. During her time at Forverts, the newspaper has increased its online presence and its outreach to people whose ancestors spoke Yiddish but are not fluent in the language themselves, including cooking videos in Yiddish and videos with English subtitles. It has also increased outreach to Hasidic Jewish readers and writers, who use different spelling of Yiddish than the YIVO standard generally used by the paper. She has brought new Yiddish writers to the paper, including women from both secular and Hasidic backgrounds.
