= Schechter =

Schachter, Schächter or Schechter (from Yiddish shochet, 'to slaughter' by Shechita. Hebrew:שכטר also Shechter) is a Yiddish and German surname. Notable people with the surname include:

== Schachter, Schächter ==
- Daniel Schacter, psychologist, neuroscientist, researcher in human memory
- Binyumen Schaechter, composer, arranger, conductor
- Carl Schachter, music theorist specializing in Schenkerian analysis
- Hershel Schachter, Rosh Yeshiva at Rabbi Isaac Elchanan Theological Seminary
- Herschel Schacter (1917–2013), American Orthodox rabbi
- Joshua Schachter, American entrepreneur
- Mioara Mugur-Schächter, French specialist on Physics and Epistemology
- Norm Schachter, American football official in the NFL
- Oscar Schachter, international law and diplomacy professor
- Rafael Schächter, Czechoslovak composer, pianist and conductor
- Sam Schachter, Canadian Olympic beach volleyball player
- Stanley Schachter, American psychologist
- Steven Schachter, American director and screenwriter
- Zalman Schachter (1924–2014), Jewish activist

== Schechter ==
- Aaron Schechter, rosh yeshiva of the Yeshiva Rabbi Chaim Berlin.
- Alan Schechter, political scientist
- Ben Schechter, American filmmaker
- Daniel Schechter, American psychiatrist, developmental neuroscientist, researcher in trauma and attachment
- Daniel Schechter (director), American filmmaker and director
- Danny Schechter, American television producer and filmmaker
- Eric Schechter, American mathematician
- Harold Schechter, American writer
- Itay Shechter, Israeli footballer currently playing for Beitar Jerusalem.
- Jody Scheckter, retired racing driver now farmer
- Martin Schechter (epidemiologist), Canadian medical epidemiologist recognized for contributions to HIV and addiction research
- Mathilde Roth Schechter, American founder of the U.S. National Women's League of Conservative Judaism.
- Ofer Shechter, Israeli actor, entertainer, model and TV host.
- Paul L. Schechter, American astronomer
- Peter Schechter, American political consultant and author
- Jay Russell (writer) Author and doctor of communications (Russell Schechter)
- Sarah Schechter, American rabbi
- Solomon Schechter, rabbi
- Sue Schechter (born 1952), American politician
- Susan Schechter (1946–2004), American domestic violence activist
- Susan Schechter Bortner, American statistician
- Yaakov Meir Shechter leader and teacher in the Breslov Hasidic movement in Israel.

== See also ==
- Schechter Letter, letter discovered in the Cairo Geniza
- Solomon Schechter Day School Association, named after Solomon Schechter
- Schechter Poultry Corp. v. United States, United States Supreme Court case
- Schecter Guitar Research, a guitar company
- Schochet, related surname
