= Leibush Lehrer =

Leibush L. Lehrer
- Born: April 6, 1887; Warsaw
- Died: September 17, 1964 (aged 77); New York, NY
- Occupations: Yiddish educator and lyricist

Leibush L. Lehrer (1887–1964) was a leading Yiddish pedagogue, writer, philosopher and lyricist. He authored several books on education, psychology, and literature. Born in Warsaw, he emigrated to the United States in 1909. From 1919 until his death, he lectured at the Jewish Teachers Seminary. Lehrer was also involved with the research efforts of YIVO as the Secretary for the Section on Psychology and Education. He was a proponent of the position that Judaism was an entire folk culture, not merely a religion.

Lehrer was the director and guiding spirit of Camp Boiberik, an educational children's camp operated by the Sholem Aleichem Folk Institute in the Hudson valley village of Rhinebeck, NY, from 1923–1964.

== Selected works ==
- Psikhologye (1919)
- Di moderne idishe shul (1927)
- Shrifṭn far psikhologye un pedagogiḳ (1933)
- Yidishḳeyṭ : un andere problemen (1940)
- Shmuel Niger bukh (1958)
- In gayst fun traditsye (1966)
