= Uriel Weinreich =

Polish-American linguist (1926–1967)

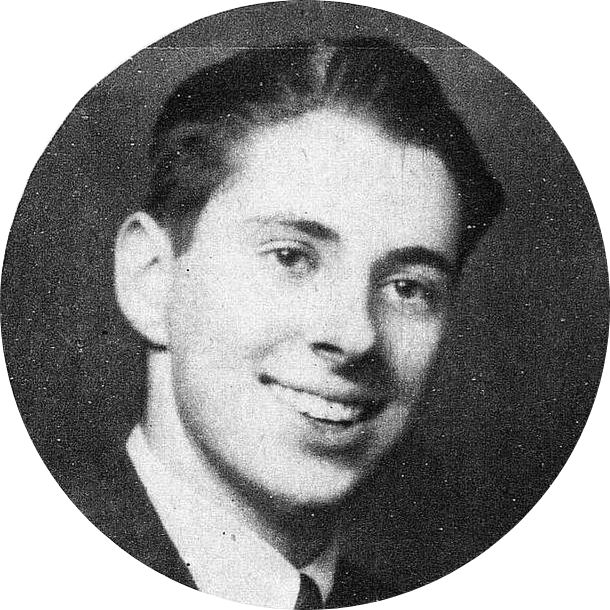
- Weinreich c. 1943
- Born: May 23, 1926; Wilno, Second Polish Republic
- Died: March 30, 1967 (aged 40); The Bronx, New York, U.S.
- Citizenship: Polish; American
- Parents: Max Weinreich (father); Regina Szabad (mother)

Academic background
- Education: Columbia University (BA, MA, PhD)

Academic work
- Discipline: linguistics
- Institutions: Columbia University
- Doctoral students: Marvin Herzog, William Labov

Uriel Weinreich (Yiddish: אוריאל ווײַנרײַך, romanized: Uriel Vaynraykh, IPA: [urˈiːəl ˈvajnrajχ]; May 23, 1926 – March 30, 1967) was a Polish and American linguist.

== Life ==
Uriel Weinreich was born in Wilno, Poland (now Vilnius, Lithuania), the first child of linguist Max Weinreich and Regina Szabad, to a family that paternally hailed from Courland in Latvia and maternally came from a well-respected and established Jewish family.

He served as a first lieutenant in the United States Army from 1944 to 1946.

He earned his BA at Columbia University in 1948, during which time he was also elected a member of Phi Beta Kappa. He earned his MA from Columbia in 1949 and his PhD in 1951. From 1951 to 1952 he was an editor and information specialist with the State Department at which point he joined Columbia University's faculty. There he specialized in Yiddish studies, sociolinguistics, and dialectology and was named the Atran Professor of Yiddish.

In 1959, he was awarded a John Simon Guggenheim Fellowship.

He advocated the increased acceptance of semantics and compiled the iconic Modern English-Yiddish Yiddish-English Dictionary, published shortly after his death. Weinreich is also credited with being one of the first linguists to appreciate the phenomenon of learner language, interlanguage, 19 years before Larry Selinker coined the term in his 1972 article "Interlanguage". In his benchmark book Languages in Contact Weinreich first noted that learners of second languages consider linguistic forms from their first language equal to forms in the target language. However the essential inequality of these forms leads to speech which the native speakers of the target language consider inferior.

Weinreich was the mentor of both Marvin Herzog, with whom he laid the groundwork for the Language and Culture Atlas of Ashkenazic Jewry (LCAAJ), and William Labov. He also co-wrote with them the 1968 book-length paper "Empirical foundations in historical linguistics", which identified five aspects of language change that are intended to describe phenomena of language change. They have become a major sociolinguistic benchmark of description.

He died of cancer on March 30, 1967, at Montefiore Hospital in the Bronx, New York, prior to the publication of his Yiddish–English dictionary.

Writing about Weinreich in his history of Yiddish, Words on fire, Dovid Katz said:

"Though he lived less than forty-one years, Uriel Weinreich ... managed to facilitate the teaching of Yiddish language at American universities, build a new Yiddish language atlas, and demonstrate the importance of Yiddish for the science of linguistics."

== Publications ==
- College Yiddish: An Introduction to the Yiddish Language and to Jewish Life and Culture (YIVO, New York, 1st edition 1949, 6th edition 1999), ISBN 0-914512-26-9.
- Languages in Contact: Findings and Problems. New York, 1953. Reprint, Mouton, The Hague, 1963, ISBN 90-279-2689-1.
- Say It in Yiddish: A Phrase Book for Travelers (with Beatrice Weinreich). Dover, New York, 1958, ISBN 0-486-20815-X.
- Modern english-yidish yidish-english verterbukh. Modern English-Yiddish Yiddish-English Dictionary (McGraw-Hill, New York, 1968 and Schocken, new paperback edition 1987), at Internet Archive https://archive.org/details/modernenglishyid00wein_0/page/n1/mode/2up ISBN 0-8052-0575-6.
