= YIVO =

Jewish cultural and linguistic institute in New York City

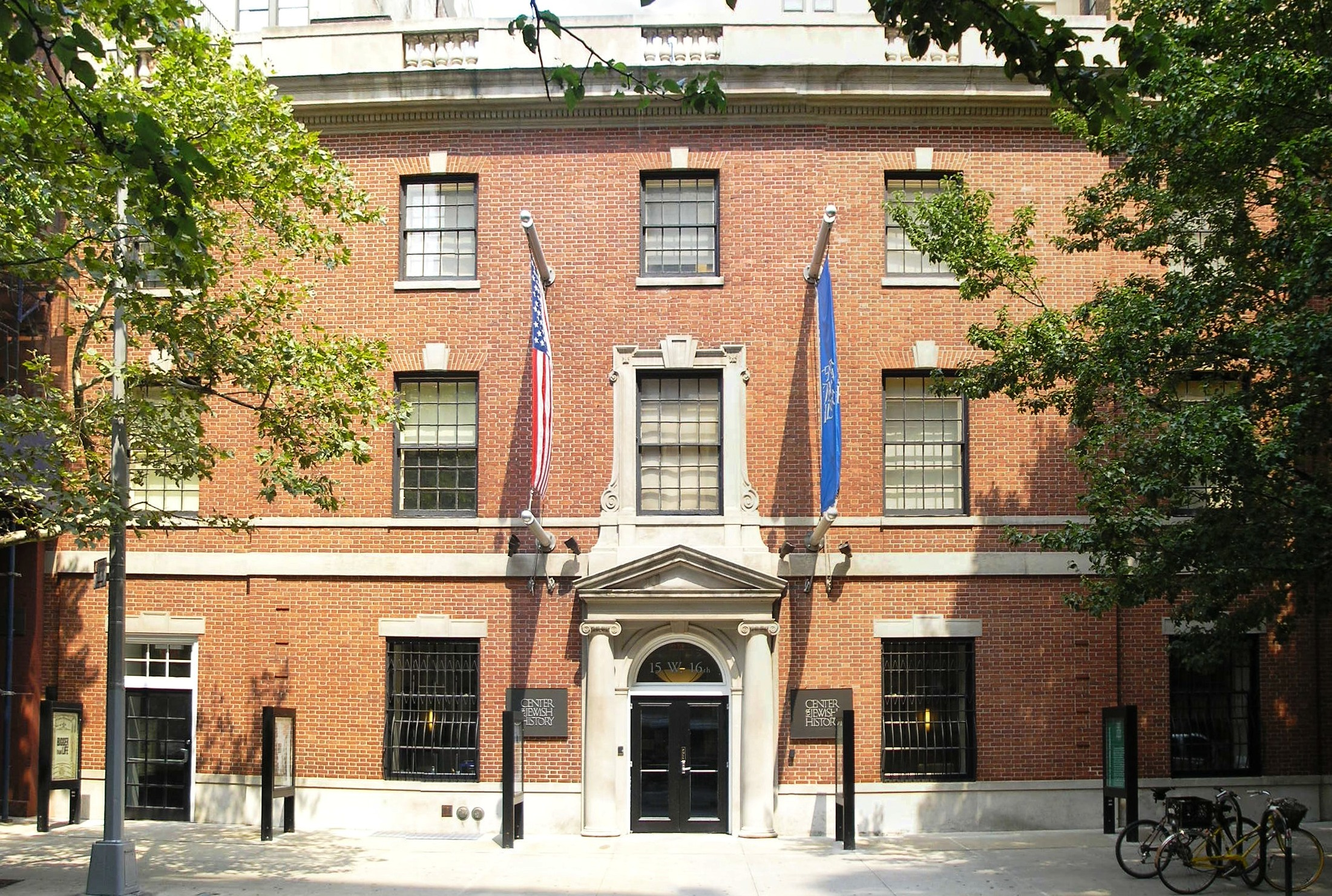
- Front entrance of YIVO in New York City
- Established: 1925
- Location: 15 West 16th Street, Manhattan, New York, United States
- Coordinates: 40°44′17″N 73°59′38″W
- Director: Jonathan Brent
- Public transit access: Subway: 14th Street–Union Square
- Website: www.yivo.org

YIVO (Yiddish: ייִוואָ, pronounced [jɪˈvɔ], short for ייִדישער װיסנשאַפֿטלעכער אינסטיטוט, yidisher visnshaftlekher institut, 'Jewish scientific institute') is an organization that preserves, studies, and teaches the cultural history of Jewish life throughout Eastern Europe, Germany, and Russia as well as orthography, lexicography, and other studies related to Yiddish. Established in 1925 in Wilno in the Second Polish Republic (now Vilnius, Lithuania) as the Yiddish Scientific Institute (Yiddish: ייִדישער וויסנשאַפֿטלעכער אינסטיטוט, romanized: Yidisher Visnshaftlekher Institut, pronounced [ˈjɪdɪʃɛr ˈvɪsn̩ʃaftlɛχɛr ɪnstɪˈtʊt]; the word yidisher means both "Yiddish" and "Jewish").

Its English name became Institute for Jewish Research after its relocation to New York City, but it is still known mainly by its Yiddish acronym. YIVO is now a partner of the Center for Jewish History, and serves as the de facto recognized language regulator of the Yiddish language in the secular world. The YIVO system is commonly taught in universities and known as klal shprakh (Yiddish: כּלל־שפּראַך, lit. 'standard language') and sometimes "YIVO Yiddish" (Yiddish: ייִוואָ־ייִדיש).

== Activities ==
YIVO preserves manuscripts, rare books, diaries, and other Yiddish sources. The YIVO Library in New York contains over 385,000 volumes dating from as early as the 16th century. Approximately 40,000 volumes are in Yiddish, making the YIVO Library the largest collection of Yiddish-language works in the world. The YIVO archives hold over 23,000,000 documents, photographs, recordings, posters, films, and other artifacts. Together, they comprise the world's largest collection of materials related to the history and culture of Central and East European Jewry and the American Jewish immigrant experience. The archives and library collections include works in twelve major languages, including English, French, German, Hebrew, Russian, Polish, and Judaeo-Spanish.

YIVO also functions as a publisher of Yiddish-language books and of periodicals including YIVO Bleter (founded 1931), Yedies Fun YIVO (founded 1929), and Yidishe Shprakh (founded 1941). It is also responsible for English-language publications such as the YIVO Annual of Jewish Social Studies (founded 1946).

In 2026, YIVO reached an agreement with the Ukrainian government to digitize the papers of Jewish ethnographer S. An-sky held by the Vernadsky National Library of Ukraine."The Man Who Wanted to Understand Every Aspect of Jewish Life". The Atlantic. October 13, 2026.

== History ==
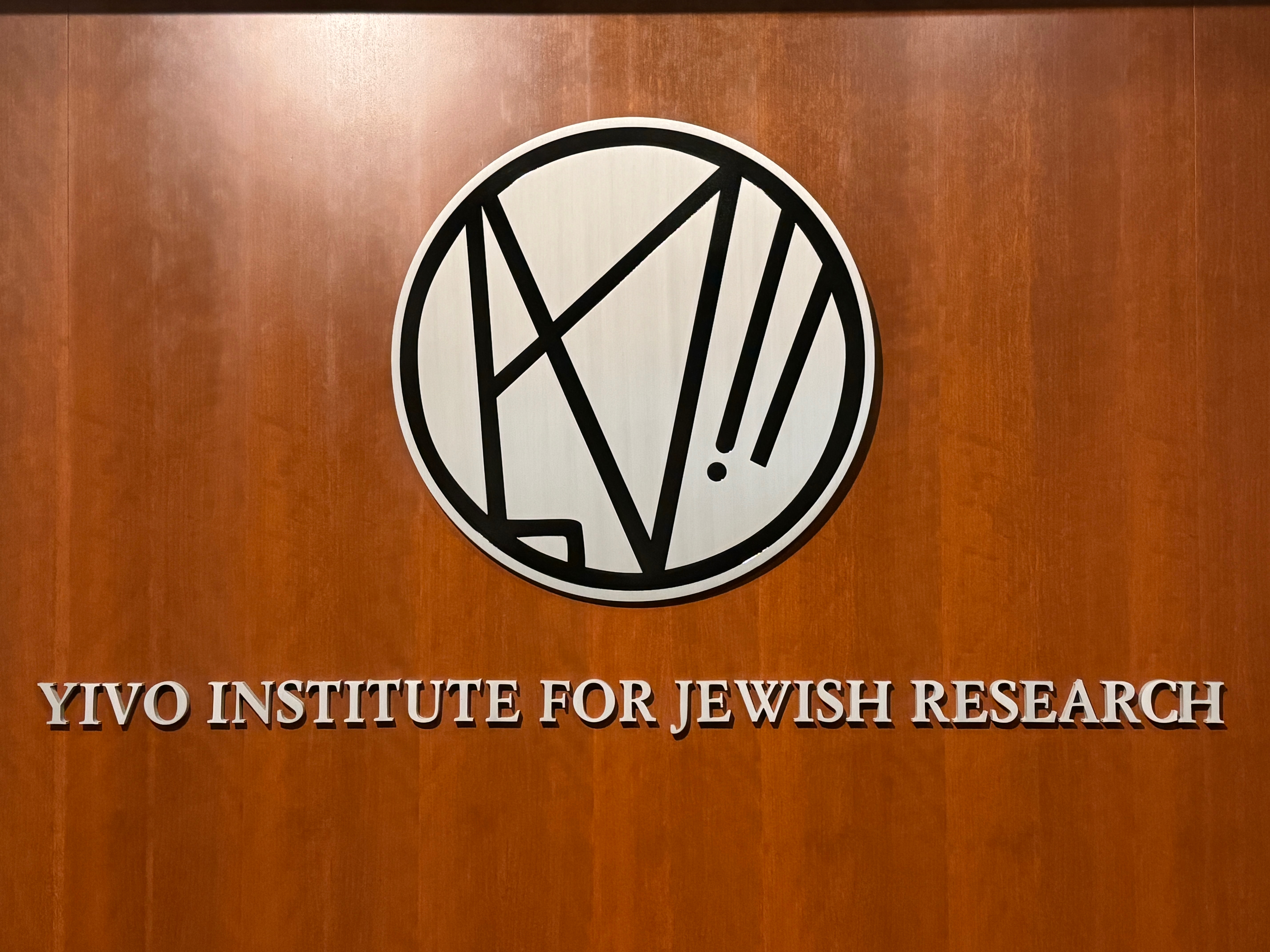
YIVO Institute for Jewish Research

YIVO was initially proposed by Yiddish linguist and writer Nochum Shtif. He characterized his advocacy of Yiddish as "realistic" Zionism, contrasted to both the "visionary" Hebraists and the "self-hating" assimilationists who adopted Russian or Polish. Other key founders included philologist Max Weinreich and historian Elias Tcherikower.

YIVO was founded at a Berlin conference in 1925, but headquartered in Vilnius, a city with a large Jewish population in the Second Polish Republic. The early YIVO also had branches in Berlin, Warsaw and New York City. Over the next decade, smaller groups arose in many of the other countries with Ashkenazi populations.

In YIVO's first decades, Tcherikover headed the historical research section, which also included Simon Dubnow, Saul M. Ginsburg, Abraham Menes, and Jacob Shatzky. Leibush Lehrer headed a section including psychologists and educators Abraham Golomb, H. S. Kasdan, and Abraham Aaron Roback. Jacob Lestschinsky headed a section of economists and demographers Ben-Adir, Liebmann Hersch, and Moshe Shalit. Weinreich's language and literature section included Judah Leib Cahan, Alexander Harkavy, Judah A. Joffe, Zelig Kalmanovich, Shmuel Niger, Noach Pryłucki, and Zalman Reisen. YIVO also collected and preserved ethnographic materials under the direction of its Ethnographic Committee., YIVO's honorary board of trustees (Curatorium) in 1925 consisted of Simon Dubnow, Albert Einstein, Sigmund Freud, Moses Gaster, Edward Sapir and Chaim Zhitlowsky.

YIVO operated a graduate training program from 1934 to 1940, known as the Aspirantur. Named after Zemach Shabad, YIVO's chairman, the program held classes and guided students in conducting original research in the field of Jewish studies. Many of the students' projects were sociological in nature (reflecting the involvement of Max Weinreich) and gathered information on contemporary Jewish life in the Vilna region.

The Nazi advance into Eastern Europe caused YIVO to move its operations to New York City. A second important center, known as the Fundacion IWO, was established in Buenos Aires, Argentina. All four directors of YIVO's research sections were already in the Americas when the war broke out or were able to make their way there. The organization's new headquarters were established in New York City in 1940. A portion of the Vilna archives was ransacked by the Nazis and sent to Frankfurt to become the basis of an antisemitic department of the Nazis' planned university. The U.S. Army recovered these documents in 1946 and sent them to YIVO in New York.

The YIVO Library was looted by the Germans and the ERR, but an organization called the "Paper Brigade" were able to smuggle out many books, and preserve them from destruction. The materials were then saved from the Soviets by a Lithuanian librarian, Antanas Ulpis, and are now held in the Lithuanian Central State Archives and Martynas Mažvydas National Library of Lithuania.

In March 2011, the year before Jeffrey Epstein went to prison, his foundation anonymously donated $50,000 to the YIVO Institute for Jewish Research.

YIVO director Jonathan Brent established the Edward Blank YIVO Vilna Online Collections project in 2014. With the help of the Lithuanian government, the project aimed to preserve and digitize over 1.5 million documents and approximately 12,200 books, representing 500 years of Jewish history in Eastern Europe and Russia.

In addition to New York City and Buenos Aires, the Chicago YIVO Society is a third center active today.

== Publications of YIVO ==
YIVO has undertaken many major scholarly publication projects, the most recent being The YIVO Encyclopedia of Jews in Eastern Europe, published in March 2008 in cooperation with Yale University Press. Under the leadership of editor-in-chief Gershon David Hundert, professor of history and of Jewish Studies at McGill University in Montreal, this unprecedented reference work systematically represents the history and culture of Eastern European Jews from their first settlement in the region to the present day. More than 1,800 alphabetical entries encompass a vast range of topics including religion, folklore, politics, art, music, theater, language and literature, places, organizations, intellectual movements, and important figures. The two-volume set also features more than 1,000 illustrations and 55 maps. With original contributions from an international team of 450 distinguished scholars, the encyclopedia covers the region between Germany and the Ural Mountains, from which more than 2.5 million Jews emigrated to the United States between 1870 and 1920.

Other YIVO publications of historic significance include:

- Hitler's Professors: The Part of Scholarship in Germany's Crimes Against the Jewish People (1946) – Max Weinreich's influential study documenting how German academics enabled and justified Nazi antisemitic policies.
- College Yiddish: An Introduction to the Yiddish Language and to Jewish Life and Culture (1949) – Uriel Weinreich's foundational Yiddish textbook linking language instruction with Jewish cultural history.
- Der Oytser fun der Yidisher Shprakh (1950) – Nahum Stutchkoff's Yiddish thesaurus, edited by Max Weinreich.
- The Early Jewish Labor Movement in the United States (1961) – YIVO's historical study, edited by Elias Tcherikower, examining the development of Jewish labor activism in America.
- Modern English-Yiddish / Yiddish-English Dictionary (1968/2012) – A Yiddish dictionary created by Uriel Weinreich and published posthumously.
- History of the Yiddish Language (1973; Published in English 1980 and 2008) – Max Weinreich's monumental study of the origins and development of Yiddish, published posthumously.
- Image Before My Eyes: A Photographic History of Jewish Life in Poland Before the Holocaust (1977) – Lucjan Dobroszycki and Barbara Kirshenblatt-Gimblett's landmark visual history of prewar Polish Jewish life, based on extensive archival photographs.
- A Century of Ambivalence: The Jews of Russia and the Soviet Union, 1881 to the Present (1988) – Zvi Gitelman's historical overview of Jewish life in Russia and the USSR, published in cooperation with YIVO .
- Yiddish Folktales (1997) – Beatrice Weinreich's anthology of Yiddish folk stories, compiled and published in cooperation with the YIVO Institute.
- The Last Days of the Jerusalem of Lithuania: Chronicles from the Vilna Ghetto and the Camps, 1939–1944 (2002) – Herman Kruk's ghetto diary edited by Benjamin Harshav, a major first-person historical source on the Holocaust preserved by YIVO.
- Awakening Lives: Autobiographies of Jewish Youth in Poland Before the Holocaust (2002) – Jeffrey Shandler's edited collection of prewar youth autobiographies drawn from YIVO's autobiographical essay competitions.
- My Future Is in America: Autobiographies of Eastern European Jewish Immigrants (2006) – Edited and translated by Jocelyn Cohen and Daniel Soyer, this volume presents autobiographies submitted to YIVO's 1942 immigrant essay contest, published in conjunction with the YIVO Institute for Jewish Research.
- New York and the American Jewish Communal Experience (2013) – Proceedings of the Milstein Conference, published by YIVO, examining Jewish communal life in New York.

== Publications about YIVO ==
YIVO and its collections have been the subject of many memoirs, reference works, and scholarly studies:

- From That Place and Time: A Memoir, 1938–1947 (1989) – Memoir by Lucy S. Dawidowicz recounting her experiences during the Holocaust, including interactions with YIVO .
- The Yiddish Catalog and Authority File of the YIVO Library (1990) – Reference work by Zachary M. Baker and Bella Hass Weinberg detailing YIVO Library's cataloging and authority files for Yiddish materials.
- Guide to the YIVO Archives (1998) – Comprehensive guide by Fruma Mohrer and Marek Web to the holdings of the YIVO archives.
- Defining the Yiddish Nation: The Jewish Folklorists of Poland (2003) – Itzik Nakhmen Gottesman's study of Jewish folklorists in Poland, including analysis of their connections to YIVO's mission and collections.
- YIVO Institute for Jewish Research: A Brief Encounter with Archives (2005) – A richly illustrated selection of materials from YIVO's archives edited by Krysia Fisher.
- YIVO and the Making of Modern Jewish Culture: Scholarship for the Yiddish Nation (2014) – Cecile Esther Kuznitz examines YIVO's role in shaping modern Jewish culture through scholarship and community engagement.
- The Book Smugglers: Partisans, Poets, and the Race to Save Jewish Treasures from the Nazis (2017) – David E. Fishman's history of the Paper Brigade in Vilna, recounting how YIVO scholars and activists rescued books and archival materials from Nazi destruction.
- Saving Yiddish: Yiddish Studies and the Language Sciences in America, 1940–1970 (2019) – Alec Leyzer Burko's dissertation on the development of Yiddish studies in the U.S., with attention to YIVO's linguistic scholarship.
- Homes of the Past: A Lost Jewish Museum (2024) – Jeffrey Shandler explores Jewish museum culture and collections with a focus on YIVO in New York City in the post-war era.
- 100 Objects from the Collections of the YIVO Institute for Jewish Research (2025) – A curated selection of objects from YIVO's collections, highlighting the institute's collecting initiatives and holdings; edited by Stefanie Halpern and designed by Alix Brandwein.

== YIVO in culture ==
YIVO's archives, library, and institutional legacy have inspired or directly contributed to a wide range of films and other cultural projects:

- Image Before My Eyes (1981) – A photographic exhibition and later film documenting Jewish life in prewar Poland using photographs from YIVO's collections.
- Partisans of Vilna (1986) – Documentary directed by Josh Waletzky including archival interviews and footage from the Vilna Ghetto; YIVO's archival material appears in the film's historical narrative.
- Yentl (1983) – The film lists YIVO Institute for Jewish Research as a "Technical Consultant" in the credits. Barbra Streisand explained, "it was not meant to be a documentary on a shtetl, although everything in the film is authentic, everything was researched, everything was checked through the YIVO Institute of Research..."
- Defiance (2008) – While not produced by YIVO, the institute holds Tuvia Bielski's handwritten Yiddish memoir; Bielski is a central figure in the film about the Bielski partisans.
- Letters to Afar (2013) – Video-art installation by Péter Forgács (with music by The Klezmatics), commissioned by YIVO and others, built from home-movie footage in YIVO's archival collections.
- No Asylum: The Untold Chapter of Anne Frank's Story (2015) – Documentary based on Otto Frank's correspondence from HIAS case files held in YIVO's archives.
- From Bowery to Broadway: New York's Yiddish Theater (2016) – YIVO co-presented this major exhibition at the Museum of the City of New York, exploring Yiddish theatrical life and its influence on American culture.
- The Great Dictionary of the Yiddish Language (2025) – A chamber opera by Alex Weiser (composer) and Ben Kaplan (librettist) premiered by YIVO; dramatizes YIVO's postwar lexicographical efforts.

== See also ==
- Academy of the Hebrew Language, for Hebrew
- Autoridad Nasionala del Ladino, for Ladino
- Dina Abramowicz (long-time YIVO librarian)
- Yiddish Book Center
- League for Yiddish
