= Susan Schechter Bortner =

American survey statistician

Susan Schechter Bortner (published as Susan Schechter) is an American survey statistician, formerly in US Government service and now a researcher at NORC at the University of Chicago, a private nonprofit social research organization.

== Education and career ==
Schechter graduated from Montgomery Blair High School in Maryland in 1972. She earned a bachelor's degree in criminology from the University of Maryland, College Park, and a master's degree in human development from Antioch University.

Her positions in government service included working as a survey researcher in the National Center for Health Statistics, as a senior statistician in the Office of Management and Budget, focusing on the classification of race and ethnicity, and in the United States Census Bureau, where she headed the American Community Survey from 2006 to 2010. After more than 25 years of government work, she moved to NORC at the University of Chicago in 2010, where she became Project Director for the Medicare Current Beneficiary Survey.

== Recognition ==
Schechter was named a Fellow of the American Statistical Association in 2005. She chaired the Social Statistics Section of the American Statistical Association in 2006. In 2017, NORC gave her their Norman Bradburn Career Achievement Award.

== Selected publications ==
- Willis, Gordon B.; Schechter, Susan (June 1997), "Evaluation of cognitive interviewing techniques: do the results generalize to the field?", Bulletin of Sociological Methodology/Bulletin de Méthodologie Sociologique, 55 (1): 40–66, doi:10.1177/075910639705500105, S2CID 144872655
- Sirken, Monroe G.; Herrmann, Douglas J.; Schechter, Susan; Schwarz, Norbert; Tanur, Judith M.; Tourangeau, Roger (1999), Cognition and Survey Research, Wiley
- Wallman, K. K.; Evinger, S.; Schechter, S. (November 2000), "Measuring our nation's diversity: developing a common language for data on race/ethnicity", American Journal of Public Health, 90 (11): 1704–1708, doi:10.2105/ajph.90.11.1704, PMC 1446413, PMID 11076235
