= Max Weinreich =

American linguist (1894–1969)

- מאַקס ווײַנרײַך
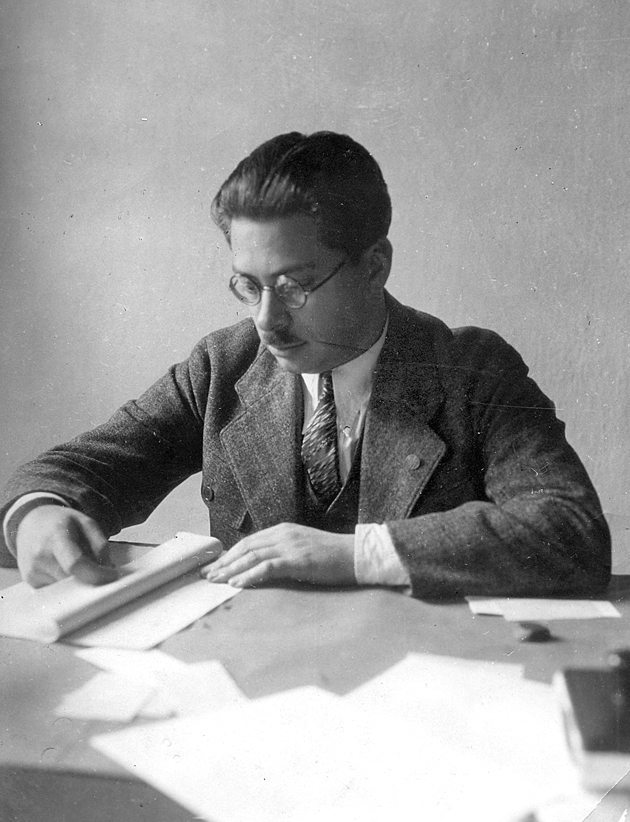
- Weinreich in Vilna, 1929
- Born: 22 April 1894; Goldingen, Courland Governorate, Russian Empire (modern Kuldīga, Latvia)
- Died: 29 January 1969 (aged 74); New York City, U.S.
- Education: University of Marburg (1923)
- Occupations: Linguist, sociolinguist
- Spouse: Regina Shabad (m. 1923)
- Children: Uriel; Gabriel
- Relatives: Zemach Shabad (father-in-law)
- Writing career
- Language: Yiddish
- Notable works: History of the Yiddish language, Hitler's Professors
- Notable awards: Guggenheim Fellowship

Max Weinreich (Yiddish: מאַקס ווײַנרײַך, Maks Vaynraykh; Russian: Мейер Лазаревич Вайнрайх, Meyer Lazarevich Vaynraykh; 22 April 1894 – 29 January 1969) was a Russian-American-Jewish linguist, specializing in sociolinguistics and Yiddish, and the father of the linguist Uriel Weinreich.

He is known for increasing language awareness of Yiddish as a standardized language; he popularised the phrase "A language is a dialect with an army and navy".

== Biography ==
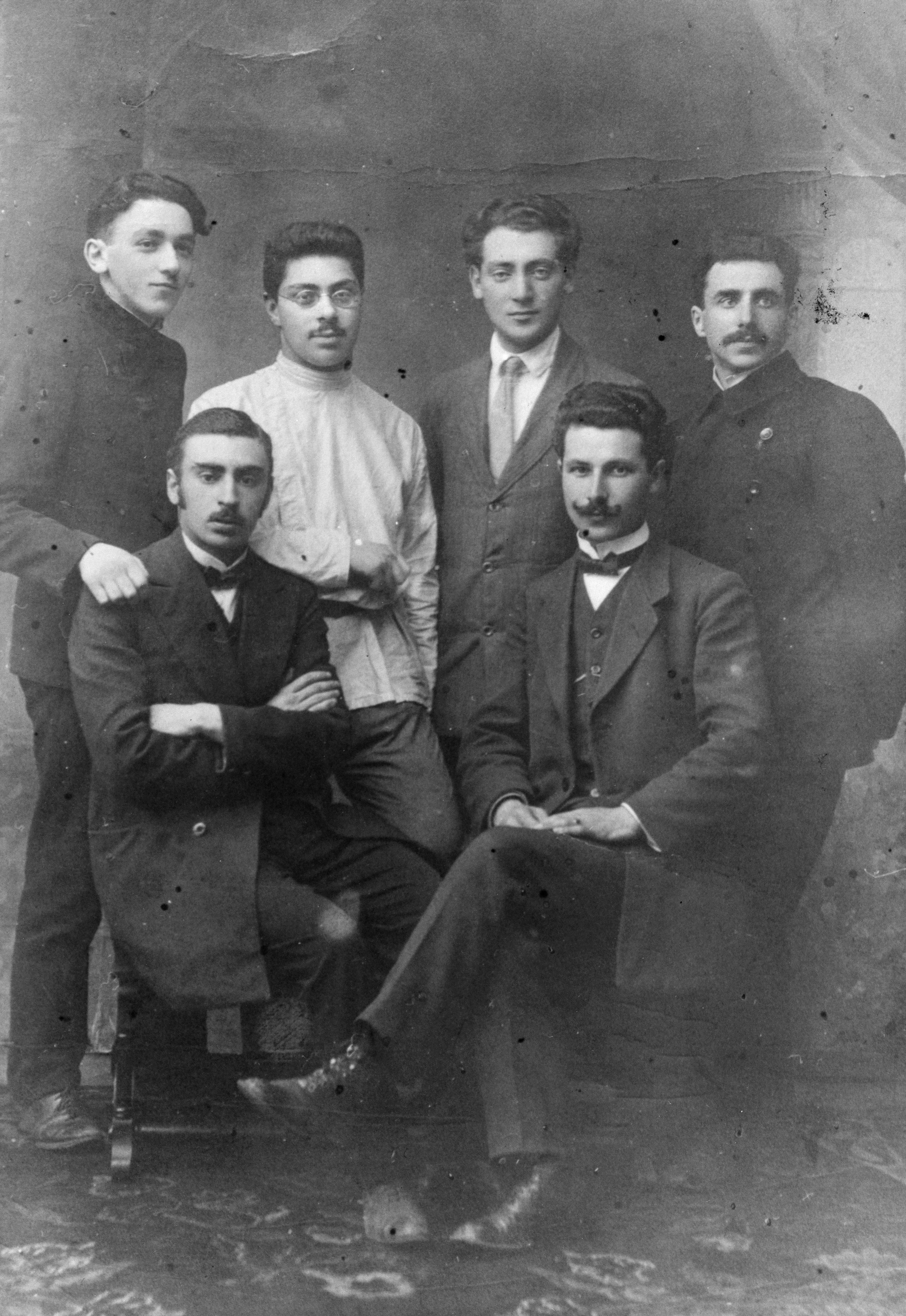
Weinreich (standing, second from left) among Kuldīga Bundists, 1913

Weinreich began his studies in a German school in Goldingen (modern Kuldīga), transferring to the gymnasium in Libau (modern Liepāja) after four years. He then lived in Daugavpils and Łódź. Between 1909 and 1912, he resided in Saint Petersburg, where he attended I. G. Eizenbet's private Jewish gymnasium for boys. He was raised in a German-speaking family but became fascinated with Yiddish. Following the October Revolution, Weinreich served as editor of the Bundist newspaper Undzer shtime (Our Voice) in Vilna before he was elected to the governing body of the city's Jewish community. Paul Novick, a fellow Bundist from Minsk, succeeded him as editor and took a room in the residence of Jewish communal leader Zemach Shabad. All three men were forced to take refuge in Shabad's home during the Vilna pogrom in 1919.

In the early 1920s, Weinreich lived in Germany and pursued studies in linguistics at the universities of Berlin and Marburg. In 1923, under the direction of German linguist Ferdinand Wrede in Marburg, he completed his dissertation, entitled "Studien zur Geschichte und dialektischen Gliederung der jiddischen Sprache" (Studies in the History and Dialect Distribution of the Yiddish language). The dissertation was published in 1993 under the title Geschichte der jiddischen Sprachforschung ("History of Yiddish Linguistics").

In 1925, Weinreich was the cofounder, along with Nochum Shtif, Elias Tcherikower, and Zalman Reisen, of YIVO (originally called the Yidisher Visnshaftlekher Institut — Yiddish Scientific Institute). Although the institute was officially founded during a conference in Berlin in August 1925, the centre of its activities was in Vilna (now Vilnius, Lithuania), which eventually became its official headquarters as well. YIVO's first office in Vilna was in a room in Weinreich's apartment. Remembered as the guiding force of the institute, Weinreich directed its linguistic, or philological section in the period before the Second World War. His children were both born in Vilna at that time: his elder son Uriel (1926-1967) a linguist and lexicographer, while the younger son Gabriel (1928-2023) was a physicist and musical acoustician.

Weinreich was in Denmark with his wife, Regina (Shabad's daughter), and his older son, Uriel, when World War II broke out in 1939. Regina returned to Vilnius, but Max and Uriel stayed abroad, moving to New York City in March 1940. YIVO was founded in Vilnius before being relocated to New York City. His wife and younger son, Gabriel, joined them there during the brief period (1920-1923) when Vilnius was in independent Lithuania. Weinreich became a professor of Yiddish at City College of New York and re-established YIVO in New York.

== Publications and Legacy ==
Weinreich’s influence on Yiddish studies is reflected institutionally in the Max Weinreich Center for Advanced Jewish Studies at the YIVO Institute for Jewish Research, named in his honor. The center sponsors research, publications, and educational programs in Yiddish language, Ashkenazi Jewish history, and East European Jewish culture, continuing the academic mission he helped establish.

Weinreich’s multi-volume History of the Yiddish Language remains a foundational work in the field. Its synthesis of linguistic, historical, and sociocultural analysis has shaped subsequent scholarship on Yiddish dialectology, origins, and development, and it is still widely cited in contemporary linguistics and Jewish studies.

Weinreich is often cited as the author of a witty quip distinguishing between languages and dialects: "A language is a dialect with an army and navy" ("אַ שפּראַך איז אַ דיאַלעקט מיט אַן אַרמײ און פֿלאָט", "a shprakh iz a dialekt mit an armey un flot"), but he was then explicitly quoting an unknown auditor at one of his lectures at Columbia University shortly after the war in 1945. This auditor was a high-school teacher who encapsulated one of the paradoxes of modern linguistics, i.e. that linguists may be in disagreement on the precise characterization of a given variety as a dialect or a language as a result of "ignor[ing] politics", while, in Maxwell's assessment, "understanding political opinion is more relevant than linguistic expertise" in the hierarchical categorization of language and dialect.

Weinreich has also appeared in contemporary cultural works. In 2025 he was portrayed as a central character in Alex Weiser and Ben Kaplan’s chamber opera The Great Dictionary of the Yiddish Language, which dramatizes postwar debates within YIVO about the creation of a comprehensive Yiddish dictionary. The opera depicts Weinreich as an institutional authority in tension with lexicographer Yudel Mark.

Publications in English:

- History of the Yiddish Language (Volumes 1 and 2) ed. Paul (Hershl) Glasser. New Haven: Yale University Press, 2008.
- Hitler's professors: the Part of Scholarship in Germany's Crimes Against the Jewish People. New Haven: Yale University Press, 1999. [first published 1946, in Yiddish and in English editions]
- History of the Yiddish language. trans. Shlomo Noble, with the assistance of Joshua A. Fishman. Chicago: University of Chicago Press, 1980. [Footnotes omitted.]

In Yiddish and German:

- Bilder fun der yidisher literaturgeshikhte fun di onheybn biz Mendele Moykher-Sforim, 1928.
- Das Jiddische Wissenschaftliche Institut ("Jiwo") die wissenschaftliche Zentralstelle des Ostjudentums, 1931.
- Fun beyde zaytn ployt: dos shturemdike lebn fun Uri Kovnern, dem nihilist, 1955
- Geschichte der jiddischen Sprachforschung. herausgegeben von Jerold C. Frakes, 1993
- Di geshikhte fun beyzn beyz, 1937.
- Geshikhte fun der yidisher shprakh: bagrifn, faktn, metodn, 1973.
- Hitlers profesorn : heylek fun der daytsher visnshaft in daytshland farbrekhns kegn yidishn folk. Nyu-York: Yidisher visnshaftlekher institut, Historishe sektsye, 1947.
- Mekhires-Yosef: ... aroysgenumen fun seyfer "Tam ve-yashar" un fun andere sforim ..., 1923.
- Der Onheyb: zamlbukh far literatur un visnshaft, redaktirt fun D. Aynhorn, Sh. Gorelik, M. Vaynraykh, 1922.
- Oysgeklibene shriftn, unter der redaktsye fun Shmuel Rozhanski, 1974.
- Der oytser fun der yidisher shprakh fun Nokhem Stutshkov; unter der redaktsye fun Maks Vaynraykh, c. 1950
- Praktishe gramatik fun der yidisher shprakh F. Haylperin un M. Vaynraykh, 1929.
- Shtaplen fir etyudn tsu der yidisher shprakhvisnshaft un literaturgeshikhte, 1923.
- Shturemvint bilder fun der yidisher geshikhte in zibtsntn yorhundert
- Di shvartse pintelekh. Vilne: Yidisher visnshaftlekher institut, 1939.
- Di Yidishe visnshaft in der hayntiker tsayt. Nyu-York: 1941.

Weinreich also translated Sigmund Freud and Ernst Toller into Yiddish.

== Sources ==
- David E. Fishman, The Rise of Modern Yiddish Culture, University of Pittsburgh Press (2005), ISBN 0-8229-4272-0.
- Gershon David Hundert, YIVO Encyclopedia of Jews in Eastern Europe, Yale University Press (2008), ISBN 0-300-11903-8.
