= Tussman =

Tussman may refer to:

== People ==
- Joseph Tussman (1914–2005), American educator
- Malka Heifetz Tussman (1893–1987), Ukrainian-American Yiddish poet

== Other uses ==
- Tussman Experimental College, educational project at the University of California, Berkeley
