= Rukhl Fishman =

Israeli poet

- רחל פישמן
- Born: 10 June 1935; Philadelphia
- Died: 26 August 1984 (aged 49)
- Occupation: poet
- Writing career
- Notable awards: Itzik Manger Prize

Rukhl Fishman, (Hebrew: רחל פישמן) also spelled Rokhl Fishman (10 June 1935 – 26 August 1984) was an Israeli poet who wrote in Yiddish. In 1978, she received the Itzik Manger Prize.

== Early life ==
Rukhl Fishman was born on 10 June, 1935 in Philadelphia, to Jewish activists Sonia and Aaron Fishman. Her brother was the sociolinguist Joshua Fishman. In the years 1941–1949, she went with her brother to a secular Jewish camp in Boiberik, and belonged to the Zionist youth organization Hashomer Hatzair. Within the organization's structures, she met her future husband, mathematician and musician Theodore Holdheim. At the age of 19, Fishman went to Israel with her husband. The couple settled in kibbutz Beit Alfa, where Fishman worked and wrote poetry. Her neighbor and friend was Sore Shabes.

== Career ==
Fishman started writing poems at a young age, under the supervision of Malka Heifetz Tussman; the mentor's influence can be seen in Fishman's passion for wordplay and the rare use of rhyme. In Israel she joined the Yung Yisroel group, of which she became the youngest member and the only person from this group who was born in the United States. She was encouraged to write by Abraham Sutzkever.

Fishman focused on writing poetry which described the immediate surroundings, nature or animals, avoiding topics popular among her peers. Her works were published in the Yung Yisroel and Di goldene keyt magazines.

Her debut volume, Zun iber alts, was published in 1960. In her later poems, she described a progressive, debilitating disease. Her last two collections of poems were published in bilingual editions, in Yiddish and Hebrew, although Fishman wrote only in Yiddish.

In 1978 she received the Itzik Manger Prize.

== Death and legacy ==
Fishman died on 26 August, 1984.

Fishman's poem "Wild She-Goat" was used in the title of the Polish anthology of Yiddish poetry by women poets called Moja dzika koza. Antologia poetek jidysz (2018) edited by Karolina Szymaniak, Joanna Lisek and Bella Szwarcman-Czarnota.

== Poetry collections ==
- Zun iber alts (Sun Over Everything), 1960
- Derner nokhn regn (Thistles After Rain), 1966
- Shamayim B'eysev/Himl tsvishn grozn (Heaven in the Grass), 1968
- Vilde tsig/Iza pziza (Wild She-Goat), 1976
