= Aaron Kramer =

American poet

- Born: December 13, 1921; Brooklyn, NY
- Died: April 7, 1997 (aged 75); Oakdale, New York
- Education: Brooklyn College, New York University
- Occupations: poet, translator, literary critic
- Spouse: Katherine
- Children: Carol, Laura
- Writing career
- Language: English
- Period: 1937-1996
- Notable works: Seven Poets in Search of an Answer (1944), The Poetry and Prose of Heinrich Heine (1948), The Prophetic Tradition in American Poetry (1968), Melville's Poetry: Toward the Enlarged Heart (1972)
- Website: aaronkramer.com

Aaron Kramer (13 December 1921 – 7 April 1997) was an American poet, translator, and social activist. A lifelong poet of political commitment, he wrote 26 volumes of poetry, three of prose, and ten of translations between 1938 and (published posthumously) 1998. Kramer taught English at Dowling College in Oakdale, Long Island, New York.

== Biography ==
Aaron Kramer was born in Brooklyn, New York. He received his B.A. (1941) and M.A. (1951) from Brooklyn College and Ph.D. (1966) from New York University. Kramer wrote his first protest poems in the mid-1930s when he was barely a teenager, through his pointed critiques of the 1983 war in Grenada and Ronald Reagan's 1985 visits to Nazi graves in Bitburg. Kramer wrote poems about the Holocaust for four decades. In the 1930s, He started writing poems about the Spanish Civil War and continued throughout most of his life. He also had an interest on writing in and commitment to testify about African American history. His first poems about exploited labor appeared in 1934 and his last were published in 1995. Kramer’s 1937 poem “The Shoe-Shine Boy” published when he was only fifteen years old. He adopted traditional meters—favoring iambic trimeters, tetrameters, and pentameter—in part to install a radical politics within inherited rhythms. His earliest poems about the suppression of freedoms in the United States date from 1938 and continued writing them through the 1980s. Kramer wrote his first pamphlet in 1938 titled The Alarm Clock, it was funded by a local Communist Party chapter. . Kramer also produced translations of “Rilke: Visions of Christ” and “Der Kaiser von Atlantis”, the opera composed by Viktor Ullmann in the Theresienstadt concentration camp in 1943. Kramer was one of the few American writers to produce one a series of poems about McCarthyism, from satiric "The Soul of Martin Dies" (1944) to "Called In" (1980), his poem of outrage against those compelled to testify before the House Un-American Activities Committee (HUAC). Kramer first gained national prominence with Seven Poets in Search of An Answer (1944) and The Poetry and Prose of Heinrich Heine (1948). His masterpiece is his 26 poems compromising the 1952 sequence “Denmark Vesey", about plans for aborted 1822 slave revolt in Charleston, South Carolina.

In addition to poetry, Kramer published collections of translations. These include several works on Heine, Rilke, Yiddish poets, and poems on the Holocaust. Lifelong pen friend Sohail Adeeb (poet, critic, literary editor) translated some of Kramer's works into Urdu.

"From "The Murdered Dreams of Aaron Kramer: A Marxist Poet in the 'American Century'"

Kramer was... the widower of a lost Communist faith who never truly remarried, an artist haunted by dreams murdered by Hitler and Stalin.

The alternatingly celebratory, stoic, and melancholic poetry of Aaron Kramer might be seen, among other ways, as the overlooked and divided love child of Pablo Neruda and Howard Zinn.

Kramer was moved by the support he received by writers around the world who rallied to support him in his stand against McCarthyism.

Kramer started teaching English at Dowling College in 1961, and became a professor there in 1966; after retiring in 1992 he continued to teach as professor emeritus until 1996.

== Private life and death ==
Kramer married Katherine and had two daughters, Carol and Laura.

He died April 7, 1997, age 75 at his home in Long Island.

== Outlook ==
Kramer's artistic identity took shape in New York City during the late 1930s and early 1940s, where he moved in left-wing literary circles and absorbed many of their attitudes and ideals. Although never affiliated with a party or ideology, Kramer consistently pursued progressive political themes in his poetry. He often wrote passionately about the injustices he perceived. Slavery and abolition were frequent themes of his early work ("Denmark Vesey," "The Ballad of August Biondi"). Racism, war and imperialism, and economic inequality were also repeated motifs in his poetry. On the other hand, Kramer frequently wrote about private, personal experiences. Both sides of his work display an idealism and optimism concerning the human capacity for endurance and compassion.

== Published works ==
Kramer's critical books include The Prophetic Tradition in American Poetry (1968) and Melville’s Poetry (1972). Kramer collaborated with artists on The Tune of the Calliope: Poems and Drawings of New York and edited the 1972 anthology On Freedom’s Side: American Poems of Protest. He wanted to radicalize root and branch the American literary tradition, not abandon it for alternative forms. He translated and edited the work 135 Yiddish poets were published as part of “A Century of Yiddish Poetry”.

Drawing largely from the records of Dowling College and his obituary in the New York Times, Kramer's published works include:

Recordings:

- Aaron Kramer reading his poems - Library of Congress (Recording Laboratory, 6 April 1982)
- Serenade by Aaron Kramer: Reading His Own and Other Poems by Poets of New York - (New York: Folkways Records, 1957)
- The Poetry of Aaron Kramer - Dowling College (podcast)
- Six Poems by Aaron Kramer - Dowling College (podcast)

Scholarly Works:

- The Prose and Poetry of Heinrich Heine (1948)
- Emma Lazarus: Her Life and Work (Thesis, Brooklyn College, 1951)
- The Prophetic Tradition in American Poetry, 1835-1900 (Rutherford, NJ: Fairleigh Dickinson University Press, 1968)
- On Freedom's Side: An Anthology of American Poems of Protest (Macmillan, 1972)
- Melville's Poetry: Toward the Enlarged Heart; A Thematic Study of Three Ignored Major Poems (Rutherford, NJ: Fairleigh Dickinson University Press, 1972)
- Neglected Aspects of American Poetry: The Greek Independence War and Other Studies (Oakdale, NY: Dowling College Press, 1997)

Anthologies:

- Seven Poets in Search of an Answer: A Poetic Symposium (with Maxwell Bodenheim, Joy Davidman, Langston Hughes, Alfred Kreymborg, Martha Millet, Norman Rosten) (B. Ackerman, 1944, 1976)
- Carousel Parkway and Other Poems (San Diego: A.S. Barnes, 1980)
- Long Island Writers: A Special Confrontation Anthology Issue (Greenvale, NY: Confrontation Magazine, C.W. Post College, 1985)
- Wicked Times: Selected Poems (Urbana, IL: University of Illinois Press, 2004)

Poetry:

- "The Shoeshine Boy" (1937)
- "The Death of President Roosevelt" (April 13, 1945)
- The Golden Trumpet (New York: International Publishers, 1949)
- Denmark Vesey and Other Poems Including Translations from the Yiddish Poems by Morris Winchevsky, Morris Rosenfeld, David Edelshtat, Joseph Bovshover (Private printing, 1952)
- Roll the Forbidden Drums! (New York: Cameron & Kahn, 1954)
- The Tune of the Calliope: Poems and Drawings of New York. Illus. Theodore Fried, et al. (New York: T. Yoseloff, 1958)
- Rumshinsky's Hat and House of Buttons: Two Collections of Poetry (New York: T. Yoseloff, 1964)
- Henry at the Grating: Poems of Nausea (New York: Folklore Center, 1968)
- On the Way to Palermo and Other Poems (South Brunswick: A.S. Barnes, 1973)
- Long Night's Journey Back to Light (Oakdale, NY: Dowling College Press, 1973)
- O Golden Land! A Travelog in Verse (Oakdale, NY: Dowling College Press, 1976)
- Long Night's Journey Back to Light II. Ed. Alex Kramer (Oakdale, NY: Dowling College Press, 1977)
- Carousel Parkway (1980)
- In Wicked Times. Illus. Barbara Allen. (Arlington, VA: Black Buzzard Press, 1983)
- In the Suburbs (Winterville, GA: Ali Baba Press, 1986)
- Indigo and Other Poems (New York: Cornwall Books, 1991)

Collection:

- The Burning Bush: Poems and Other Writings (1940–1980). Ed. Thomas Yoseloff (New York: Cornwall Books, 1983)

Essays:

- Regrouping: Poems (Northport, NY: Birnham WoodGraphics, 1997)

Translations:

- Moses: Poems and Translations (New York: O'Hare Books, 1962)
- Songs and Ballads: Goethe, Schiller, Heine. Trans. Aaron Kramer (New York: O'Hare Books, 1963)
- Rilke, Rainer Maria. Visions of Christ: A Posthumous Cycle of Poems. Ed. Siegfried Mandel. Trans. Aaron Kramer (Boulder, CO: University of Colorado Press, 1967)
- Reisen, Abraham. Poems. Trans. Aaron Kramer (Privately printed, 1971)
- The Last Lullaby: Poetry from the Holocaust. Ed. and trans. Aaron Kramer. Illus. Saul Lishinsky (Syracuse, NY: Syracuse University Press, 1998)
- Zychlinsky, Rajzel. God Hid His Face. Trans. Barnett Zumoff, Aaron Kramer, Marek Kanter, et al. (Santa Rosa, CA: Word & Quill Press, 1997)

Edited and translated:

- A Century of Yiddish Poetry. Ed. and trans. Aaron Kramer (New York: Cornwall Books, 1989)
- Teitelboim, Dora. All My Yesterdays Were Steps: The Selected Poems of Dora Teitelboim. Ed. and trans. Aaron Kramer. Illus. Stan Kaplan (Hoboken, NJ: Dora Teitelboim Foundation, 1995)

Editing:

"In later years, Kramer co-edited West Hills Review: a Whitman Journal, and edited or co-edited numerous other anthologies."
