= Itzik Manger Prize =

Israeli literary prize for Yiddish works

The Itzik Manger Prize for outstanding contributions to Yiddish literature (Hebrew: פרס איציק מַאנגֶר ליצירה ספרותית ביידיש, Yiddish: איציק מאַנגער פּרײַז פֿאַר ליטעראַטור־שאַפֿונג אין ײִדיש) was established in 1968, shortly before Itzik Manger's death in 1969. Manger "was and remains one of the best-known twentieth-century Yiddish poets." The Prize has been described as the "most prestigious in Yiddish letters". The prize was awarded annually from 1969 to 1999.

== History ==
The prize was initiated by Meyer Weisgal, who was frustrated when Manger—then very ill—was denied the Israel Prize. The inaugural prize was given to Manger himself at a banquet on October 31, 1968. The banquet was attended by Golda Meir, then the prime minister of Israel, and by Zalman Shazar, then president. Subsequently, the prize was awarded annually, sometimes to several writers.

== List of recipients ==
- 1969: Abraham Sutzkever, Aaron Zeitlin
- 1970: Jacob Friedmann, Chaim Grade, Yoysef Kerler
- 1971: Kadia Molodowsky, Yekhiel Hofer
- 1972: Maurice Samuel, Isaiah Spiegel
- 1973: Isaac Bashevis Singer
- 1974: Joseph Buloff, Rachel Korn
- 1975: Rajzel Zychlinsky
- 1976: Arye Shamri, Leyzer Aykhenrand
- 1977: Yehuda Elberg, Hirsh Osherovitsh, Yankev-Tsvi Shargel
- 1978: Rukhl Fishman, Meyer Stiker, Uri Zvi Greenberg, Eli Schechtman, Mordechai Strigler
- 1979: Chava Rosenfarb, Shloyme Rotman, Shimshon Meltser, Shloyme Shenhod, Avrom Zak
- 1980: Samson Dunsky, Zyame Telesin, Jonas Turkow, Zvi Ayznman, Nakhmen Rap, Yitskhok Yanasovitsh
- 1981: Binem Heller, Elias Lipiner, Abraham Karpinowitz, Malka Heifetz Tussman
- 1982: Yaakov Zipper
- 1983: Chone Szmeruk, Moishe Valdman, David E. Wolpe
- 1984: Rivka Basman Ben-Hayim, Yosl Lerner, Eliezer Podriachik
- 1985: Dov Seltzer, Itche Goldberg
- 1986: Pesach Burstein, Samuel L. Schneiderman, Elias Schulman
- 1988: Dina Halpern, Chava Turniansky, Ruth R. Wisse
- 1991: Yossl Birstein, Yonia Fain
- 1994: Mordkhe Schaechter, Rafael Chwoles
- 1997: Dovid Katz, Lev Berinski, Yiddishpiel
- 1998: Dan Miron
- 1999: Chava Alberstein, Joshua Fishman, Yenta Mash
- Zvi Kanar, Joseph Mloteck
