= Itche Goldberg =

Polish-born Jewish writer and activist

Itche Goldberg in 2006

Itche Goldberg (Yiddish: איטשע גאָלדבערג; March 22, 1904 – December 27, 2006) was a Polish-born Yiddish language writer of children's books, poet, librettist, educator, literary critic, camp director, publisher, fundraiser, essayist, literary editor, Yiddish language and culture scholar, and left-wing political activist. He devoted his life to the preservation of the Yiddish language and secular Yiddish culture.

== Early years ==
Goldberg was born in Opatów, Poland, and moved to Warsaw in 1914, attending Poznanski Teachers Seminary. In 1920 he moved to Toronto, Ontario, Canada, studying philosophy, German and political science at McMaster University. While in Toronto, he taught Yiddish at The Workmen's Circle (now The Workers Circle); it was in Toronto that his leftist/pro-communist sympathies matured.

He moved to New York City in the late 1920s, and continued teaching Yiddish there as well as in Philadelphia, but left the socialist Workmen's Circle schools for the more radical Arbeter Ordn Shuln.

The education schism, with Goldberg and many schools leaving the Arbeter Ring to form the Ordn network, was part of an exceedingly vituperative break within the leftist Yiddish community between the communists and socialists (who the communists sometimes called "social fascists").

== Yiddishist ==
"We're dealing with a language that is about 1,000 years old and a literature that is 600 or 700 years old. What developed was an extraordinary and profound modern literature which would become the equivalent of French and German literature."

Passing on the Yiddish tradition to future generations was a mainstay of his life. From 1937 to 1951 he was editor of Yungvarg, a children's magazine. He wrote many children's stories, and his book, Yiddish Stories for Young People, is still being used at Workmen's Circle schools. From 1970 to 1985 he was professor of Yiddish language and literature at Queens College CUNY. He may be currently best known as editor from 1964 to 2004 of the longest-running journal of Yiddish literature, Yidishe Kultur. The frequency of publication went down during this period, as Yiddish writers and speakers gradually died off. The final edition was published in 2004. Yet, he clung to the notion that Yiddish can still be a living language. He saw, in the Yiddish/Jewish culture of Eastern Europe, humanistic and progressive values. He felt that these were important, not religious ritual. He even criticized Nobel Prize–winning author I.B. Singer for not portraying these ideals in his writings.

== Leftist ==
"There was no question about our Jewishness or Jewish consciousness and the Jewish consciousness led us very naturally to the Soviet Union. Here was Romania, anti-Semitic; here was Poland, which was anti-Semitic. Suddenly we saw how Jewish culture was developing in the Soviet Union. It was really breathtaking. You had the feeling that both the national problem was solved and the social problem was solved. This was no small thing. It was overpowering and we were young."

Goldberg, a secular Jew, had been closely associated with left-wing causes for many years. There were probably several threads to his attraction to a radical cause. His close associates in Toronto were communists, including his brother-in-law, who shared his revolutionary worldview of social justice.

He saw the Soviet Union as the salvation for the Jewish national and social problems. Also, he described an embedded rebelliousness in those doubly alienated, "suffering and benefiting from 'rejection [and persecution] by the Gentiles, but also their own rejection of the narrowness of the rabbi and merchant dominated shtetl life'".

Shortly after moving to New York City, he became director of the Arbeter Ordn Shuln, and helped set up a nationwide network of these schools, reaching a peak number of 140. Best described as supplemental schools, they aimed at promoting Yiddish identity, as well as inculcating the concepts of class consciousness and social justice. Goldberg saw two function of the shuln (school); "to revolutionize Yiddish education and to separate religion from education for the first time in Jewish history; and on the other hand to ensure that progressive secularism is carried forward from generation to generation." For decades beginning in the 1920s, including two as director, he was associated with Camp Kinderland, known as a "red diaper baby" camp.

From 1937-51, he was national school and cultural director of the Jewish People's Fraternal Order, a branch of the pro-Communist International Workers Order. At its peak after World War II the JPFO had 50,000 members.

When the IWO was about to be liquidated during the Red Scare in 1954 by the Department of Insurance of New York State (IWO was a fiscally sound fraternal benefit insurance company with close to 200,000 members in its peak years, 1946–47), Itche withdrew the Yiddish shuls from the JPFO in order to preserve them, creating the independent Service Bureau for Jewish Education so that the schools could continue to function. In the anti-left atmosphere of the period, this effort was only partially successful.

Over time he made a transition to democratic socialism, eventually seeing the Soviet Union as an anti-model. By the 1950s his enthusiasm for the Soviet Union had completely evaporated, particularly after the Soviets executed Jewish writers in 1952.

Beginning in 1957 Yiddishe Kultur co-sponsored an annual public remembrance of the 12 August 1952 murders.

Nevertheless, he remained a central figure in the Jewish left for decades. Goldberg wrote and lectured frequently on the proud Jewish content he found in the works of such Soviet Yiddish writers as Perets Markish, David Hofstein, and David Bergelson. The Yidisher Kultur Farband (YKUF) in whose leadership Goldberg served for many years published numerous works by these authors when other Yiddish publishers in the west rejected them as outside of the Yiddish canon.

== Centenary and accolades ==
In honor of his 100th birthday the Jewish People's Philharmonic Chorus had a concert which included a musical adaptation of I.L. Peretz's "Oyb Nit Nokh Hekher", with libretto by Itche Goldberg. In another 100th birthday tribute, Jerrold Nadler honored him in the United States House of Representatives by saying, "Mir shatsn op ayer vunderlekhe arbet letoyves der yidisher kultur vos hot baraykhert dem gontsn Yiddishn yishev." "We honor your wonderful work for the benefit of Yiddish culture, which enriches the entire Jewish community."

Goldberg had won the Itzik Manger Prize for Yiddish literature in 1985.

== Death ==
He died at age 102. His last book was Essayen Tsvey (Essays Two) in 2004, when he was 100 years. In honor of this publication, a commemoration of his life was held on July 25, 2006, sponsored by YIVO and League for Yiddish. A Josh Waletzky documentary was made of his life at age 101, "Itche Goldberg, A Century Of Yiddish Letters", and was shown at this event.
