= Rivka Basman Ben-Hayim =

Israeli Yiddish poet (1925–2023)

- רבקה באסמאן
- Born: Rivka Basman; 20 February 1925; Vilkmergė, Lithuania
- Died: 22 March 2023 (aged 98); Herzliya, Israel
- Occupations: Poet, teacher
- Spouse: Shmuel Ben-Hayim
- Writing career
- Language: Yiddish

Rivka Basman Ben-Hayim (Yiddish: רבקה באסמאן; 20 February 1925 – 22 March 2023) was a Lithuanian-born Israeli Yiddish poet and educator. She was the recipient of the Itzik Manger Prize in 1984. Basman was also awarded the Chaim Zhitlowsky Prize in 1998.

== Early life ==
Rivka Basman was born in Vilkmergė, Lithuania on 20 February 1925, to parents Yekhezkel and Tsipora (née Heyman). While in school, she and her friends were excited to read the poems and stories of Kadya Molodowsky, a Yiddish woman writer. Basman's father and her younger brother Arele were killed by the Germans in the Baltic. During World War II, Basman spent about two years in the Vilna Ghetto. After that she was sent to the Kaiserwald concentration camp in Riga.

Basman started writing poetry at Kaiserwald in order to cheer up fellow inmates. When the camp was liquidated, she saved her poems by smuggling them out in her mouth. After liberation, Basman lived in Belgrade from 1945 to 1947. While there she married Shmuel "Mula" Ben-Hayim and with him engaged in smuggling Jews out of Europe and past the British naval blockade to enter Mandate Palestine.

== Education ==
In 1947 Basman made aliyah and then joined Kibbutz HaMa'apil. She received her teaching diploma from the Teachers' Seminary in Tel Aviv. She also studied literature while in New York at Columbia University. At her kibbutz she taught children and also joined the Yiddish poets' group Yung Yisroel ("Young Israel") While on the kibbutz she wrote and published her first volume of poetry, Toybn baym brunem (Doves at the Well), in 1959.

== Writing career ==
During the years 1963 to 1965, her husband became the cultural attaché from Israel to the Soviet Union. Basman taught the children of the diplomats in Moscow during her time there. She also met with Russian Yiddish authors.

Basman Ben-Hayim wrote her poems mostly in Yiddish. Since that time many of her poems have been translated into Hebrew. While he was living, her husband did the design and all of the illustrations for her books. After his death, she took his family name and added it in with hers.

Basman Ben-Hayim continued to write poetry and was the head of the Union of Yiddish Writers located in Tel Aviv.

== Personal life and death ==
Basman Ben-Hayim resided in Herzliya Pituah. She died in Herzliya, Israel on March 22, 2023, at the age of 98.

== Awards ==
Basman Ben-Hayim was the recipient of the Itzik Manger Prize in 1984. Basman was also awarded the Chaim Zhitlowsky Prize in 1998. Other prizes and awards include the Arie Shamri prize in 1980; the Fischman prize in 1983; the prize awarded by the chairman of the World Zionist Federation in 1989; the David Hofstein prize in 1992; The Beit Sholem Aleichem (Polack) prize in 1994; the Leib Malakh prize awarded by Beit Leivick in 1995; and the Mendele prize of the city of Tel Aviv-Yafo in 1997.

== Books of poetry ==
- Toybn baym brunem (Doves at the Well, 1959)
- Bleter fun vegn (Leaves of the Paths, 1967)
- Likhtike shteyner (Radiant Stones, 1972)
- Tseshotene kreln (Scattered Beads, 1982)
- Onrirn di tsayt (To Touch Time, 1988)
- Di shtilkayt brent (The Silence Burns, 1992)
- Di erd gedenkt (The Earth Remembers, 1998)
- Di draytsnte sho (The Thirteenth Hour, 2000)
- Af a strune fun regn (On a Strand of Rain, 2002)
