= Joshua Fishman =

American linguist (1926 – 2015)

Joshua A. Fishman
- שיקל פֿישמאַן
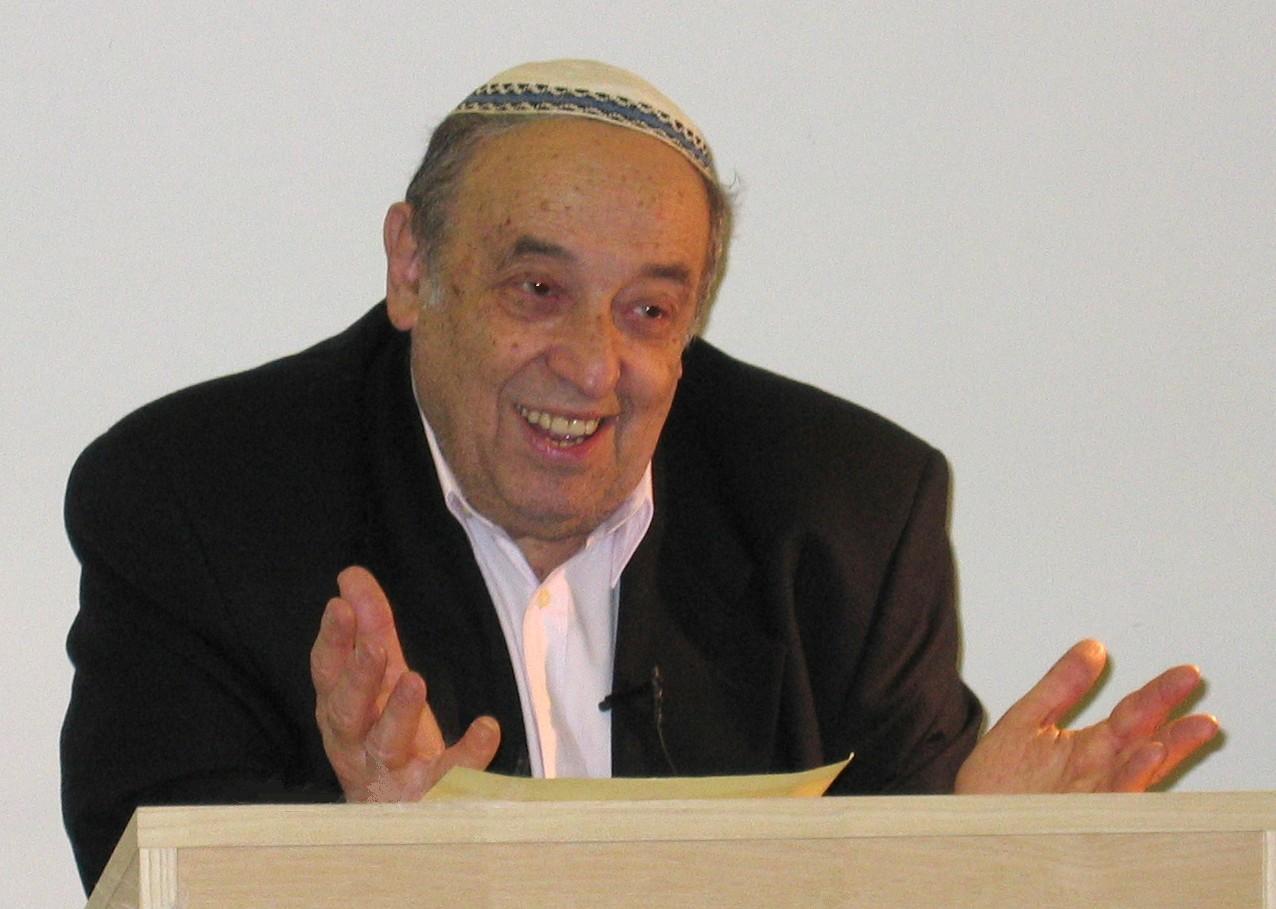
- Fishman giving a speech about the Gaelic language at the University of Aberdeen
- Born: July 18, 1926; Philadelphia, Pennsylvania, U.S.
- Died: March 1, 2015 (aged 88); The Bronx, New York, U.S.
- Education: University of Pennsylvania (B.S., M.S.); Columbia University (Ph.D.)
- Occupation: Linguist
- Children: David Fishman, Avi Fishman

Joshua Fishman (Yiddish: שיקל פֿישמאַן — Shikl Fishman; July 18, 1926 – March 1, 2015) was an American linguist who specialized in the sociology of language, language planning, bilingual education, and language and ethnicity.

== Early life and education ==
Joshua A. Fishman (Yiddish name Shikl) was born and raised in Philadelphia. His sister was the poet Rukhl Fishman. He attended public schools while also studying Yiddish at elementary and secondary levels. As he grew up, his father would ask his children at the dinner table, "What did you do for Yiddish today?" He studied Yiddish in Workmen's Circle Schools, which emphasized mastery of the Yiddish language along with a focus on literature, history, and social issues. He graduated from Olney High School. He attended the University of Pennsylvania on a Mayor's Scholarship, 1944-1948, earning a B.S. and an M.S., in history and psychology, respectively. He went on to get a PhD in social psychology from Columbia University in 1953.

He is the father of Monele Fishman, David Fishman and Avi Fishman.

== Career ==
After graduating, he studied Yiddish with Max Weinreich during the summer of 1948. During that time, he received a prize from the YIVO (Institute for Yiddish Research) for a monograph on bilingualism. In 1951-52 he held a position as a research assistant for the Jewish Education Committee of New York. In December 1951, he married Gella Schweid, with whom he shared a lifelong commitment to Yiddish. In 1953, he completed his Ph.D. in social psychology at Columbia University with a dissertation entitled Negative Stereotypes Concerning Americans among American-born Children Receiving Various Types of Minority-group Education.

From 1955 to 1958, he taught the sociology of language at the City College of New York while he was also directing research at the College Entrance Examination Board. In 1958, he was appointed an associate professor of human relations and psychology at Penn. He subsequently accepted a post as professor of psychology and sociology at Yeshiva University in New York, where he would also serve as dean of the Ferkauf Graduate School of Social Sciences and Humanities as well as academic vice president. In 1966, he was made Distinguished University Research Professor of Social Sciences.

In 1988, he became professor emeritus and became affiliated with a number of other institutions: Visiting Professor and Visiting Scholar, School of Education, Applied Linguistics and Department of Linguistics, Stanford University; Adjunct Professor of Multilingual and Multicultural Education, School of Education, New York University; Visiting Professor of Linguistics, City University of New York, Graduate Center. He has held visiting appointments and fellowships at over a dozen institutions around the world, including the Center for Advanced Study in the Behavioral Sciences (Stanford, CA) and the Institute for Advanced Study (Princeton, NJ).

== Impact ==
Fishman wrote over 1000 articles and monographs on multilingualism, bilingual education and minority education, the sociology and history of the Yiddish language, language planning, reversing language shift, language revival, 'language and nationalism', 'language and religion', and 'language and ethnicity'. Fishman is the founder and editor of the Contributions to the Sociology of Language book series by Mouton de Gruyter.

Fishman devised the influential Graded Intergenerational Disruption Scale (GIDS), used for determining whether languages are endangered, in his book Reversing Language Shift. The Expanded GIDS was based on this and is used by Ethnologue.

According to Ghil'ad Zuckermann, "The founder and general editor of the leading refereed publication International Journal of the Sociology of Language, Fishman created an intellectual platform that has greatly facilitated the introduction and dissemination of novel models and revolutionary theories that have led to numerous academic debates, syntheses and cross-fertilizations. He has often acted as an epistemological bridge between, and antidote for, parallel discourses."

And "One ought to assess the breadth and depth of Fishman’s work through a combined Jewish-sociolinguistic lens." Zuckermann has argued that "Fishman’s research embodies the integration of Jewish scholarship with general linguistics. [...] Jewish linguistics, the exploration of Jewish languages such as Yiddish, has shaped general sociolinguistics. Throughout history Jews have been multilingual immigrants, resulting in Jewish languages embodying intricate and intriguing mechanisms of language contact and identity. These languages were thus fertile ground for the establishment and evolution of the sociology of language in general. Given the importance in Judaism not only of mentshlikhkayt (cf. humaneness) but also of education and 'on the other hand' dialectics, it is not surprising to find the self-propelled institute Fishman trailblazing simultaneously both in Yiddish scholarship in particular and in the sociology of language in general."

== Special honors ==
In 1991, Fishman was honored by two Festschriften, publications to celebrate his 65th birthday, each filled with articles by colleagues that followed his interests. One was a three volume collection of articles concerned with his interests, edited by Garcia, Dow, and Marshall, the other a single volume edited by Cooper and Spolsky.

In 1999, Fishman received the Itzik Manger Prize for contributions to Yiddish letters.

In 2004, he was awarded the Linguapax Prize. He was also named "an honorary member of the Royal Academy of the Basque Language."

On September 10, 2006, Fishman was honored by a one-day symposium at the University of Pennsylvania, commemorating his 80th birthday. He died in the Bronx, New York, on March 1, 2015, at the age of 88.

== Archives ==
In 1994 the Stanford University Libraries established the 'Joshua A. Fishman and Gella Schweid Fishman Family Archives' within their Special Collections Section. The archive contains drafts of subsequently published books and articles, course outlines, lectures given, professional correspondence, family correspondence, photographs, audio-tapes, video-tapes, and other materials pertaining to Fishman's work.

== Bibliography ==
- 1964. Language Maintenance and Language Shift as a field of inquiry. A definition of the field and suggestions for its further development. Linguistics Vol 2, Issue 9.
- 1965. Yiddish in America: socio-linguistic description and analysis. Bloomington: Indiana University Press; The Hague, Netherlands: Mouton
- 1966. Language loyalty in the United States; the maintenance and perpetuation of non-English mother tongues by American ethnic and religious groups. The Hague: Mouton
- 1966. Hungarian language maintenance in the United States. Bloomington: Indiana University Press
- 1968. Language problems of developing nations. New York: Wiley
- 1968. Readings in the sociology of language. The Hague, Paris: Mouton
- 1970. Sociolinguistics: a brief introduction. Rowley, Mass.: Newbury House
- 1971. Bilingualism in the barrio. Bloomington: Indiana University Press
- 1971-2. Advances in the sociology of language. The Hague: Mouton
- 1972. Language in Sociocultural Change. Essays by Joshua A. Fishman. Ed. Anwar S. Dil. Stanford: Stanford University Press
- 1972. The sociology of language; an interdisciplinary social science approach to language in society. Rowley, Mass.: Newbury House
- 1973 (c 1972). Language and nationalism; two integrative essays. Rowley, Mass.: Newbury House
- 1974. Advances in language planning. The Hague: Mouton
- 1976. Bilingual education: an international sociological perspective. Rowley, Mass.: Newbury House
- 1977. Advances in the creation and revision of writing systems. The Hague: Mouton
- 1978. Advances in the study of societal multilingualism. The Hague: Mouton
- 1981. Never Say Die: A Thousand Years of Yiddish in Jewish Life and Letters. The Hague: Mouton. ISBN 90-279-7978-2 (in Yiddish and English)
- 1982. The acquisition of biliteracy: a comparative ethnography of minority ethnolinguistic schools in New York City. New York, N.Y.: Yeshiva University, Ferkauf Graduate School of Psychology
- 1982. Bilingual education for Hispanic students in the United States. New York: Teachers College Press
- 1983. Progress in language planning: international perspectives. Berlin & New York: Mouton.
- 1985. The rise and fall of the ethnic revival: perspectives on language and ethnicity. Berlin & New York: Mouton
- 1987. Ideology, Society and Language: The Odyssey of Nathan Birnbaum. Ann Arbor: Karoma Publishers
- 1991. Bilingual education. Amsterdam & Philadelphia: J. Benjamins Pub. Co
- 1991. Reversing language Shift: Theory and Practice of Assistance to Threatened Languages. Clevedon, Multilingual Matters. (ISBN 185359122X)
- 1991. Language and Ethnicity. Amsterdam & Philadelphia: J. Benjamins Pub. Co
- 1996. Post-Imperial English: The Status of English in Former British and American Colonies and Spheres of Influence. (ed.) Mouton de Gruyter, Berlin
- 1997. In Praise of the Beloved Language; The Content of Positive Ethnolinguistic Consciousness. Berlin, Mouton de Gruyter
- 1997. The Multilingual Apple: Languages in New York (with Ofelia Garcia). Berlin, Mouton de Gruyter
- 1999. Handbook of Language and Ethnicity (ed.). New York, Oxford University Press. Revised ed. 2009. (ISBN 0195374924)
- 2000. Can Threatened Languages Be Saved? Clevedon, Multilingual Matters
- 2006. Do Not Leave Your Language Alone: The Hidden Status Agendas Within Corpus Planning in Language Policy. Lawrence Erlbaum Associates. (ISBN 0805850244) (ISBN 978-0-8058-5024-6)

== Sources ==
- Baker, Colin; Jones, Sylvia P. (eds.) (1998). Encyclopedia of Bilingualism and Bilingual Education. Clevedon, UK: Multilingual Matters. "Joshua A. Fishman", p. 189. ISBN 978-1-85359-362-8.
- Chassie, Karen et al. (eds.) (2006). Who’s Who in the East. New Providence, NJ: Marquis Who's Who. "Fishman, Joshua Aaron"
- Cooper, Robert L.; Spolsky, Bernard (eds.) (1991). The Influence of Language on Culture and Thought: Essays in Honor of Joshua A. Fishman’s Sixty-Fifth Birthday. Berlin: Mouton. Editors' introduction, pp. 1–5.
- Fishman, Joshua A. (2006). Joshua A. Fishman. Retrieved on August 24, 2006 from http://www.joshuaafishman.com
- Fishman, Gella Schweid; Njau, Charity (2012). "Joshua A. Fishman bibliography (1949-2011)". International Journal of the Sociology of Language 213: 153–248.
- García, Ofelia; Dow, James R.; Marshall, David F. (eds.) (1991). Essays in honor of Joshua A. Fishman: Volume 1: Focus on Bilingual Education; Volume 2: Focus on Language and Ethnicity; Volume 3: Focus on Language Planning. 3 Volumes (set). Amsterdam: John Benjamins. In vol. 1: Ofelia García, "A Gathering of Voices, a 'Legion of Scholarly Decency' and Bilingual Education: Fishman's Biographemes as Introduction", pp. 3–19; in vol. 2: Editor's introduction, pp. 1–7; in vol. 3: David F. Marshall, "Introduction: To Honor a Man and His Calling", pp. 1–6, and Karen L. Adams and Daniel T. Brink, "Joshua A. Fishman on Language Planning: 'Brotherhood' Does Not Mean Uniformity", pp. 7–27.
- García, Ofelia; Peltz, Rakhmiel; Schiffman, Harold F.; with Gella Schweid Fishman (July 10, 2006). Language Loyalty, Continuity and Change: Joshua A. Fishman's Contributions to International Sociolinguistics. Clevedon, UK: Multilingual Matters. ISBN 978-1-85359-902-6.
- Spolsky, Bernard (1999). "Fishman, Joshua A. (1926– )". In Spolsky (ed.), Concise Encyclopedia of Educational Linguistics. Amsterdam: Elsevier. p. 758-759. ISBN 978-0-08043-163-5.
