= Yidisher Kultur Farband =

Pro-communist society for the preservation and development of Jewish culture in Yiddish

- Founded at: United States

Yidisher Kultur Farband (יידישער קולטור-פאַרבאַנד ,YKUF, rarely called by its English [translated] name, the Jewish Culture Association) was a Communist-oriented organization, formed for preserving and developing Yiddish culture in Yiddish and in English, through an art section, a writers' group, reading circles, and publications. YKUF was founded in Paris in September 1937 by Jewish Communists and their supporters as an international body to disseminate ideology to the Yiddish-reading and Yiddish-speaking community.

The organizing meeting was an international congress of Yiddish culture, the first to be held since the 1908 Czernowitz Conference for the Yiddish Language; about 100 delegates attended, including 11 from the United States. The first chairman of YKUF was the non-Communist writer Alexander Mukdoni; the secretary (to 1957) was the poet Zishe Weinper, an efficient fundraiser for YKUF and, according to Melech Epstein, a "secret member of the Communist Party." In the U.S., financial support also came from the Jewish People's Fraternal Order, the Jewish section of the International Workers Order. At the time of the non-aggression pact between Joseph Stalin and Adolf Hitler in August 1939, many of the non-Communist artists and writers affiliated with YKUF left the organization.

Branches of the international YKUF were established in various countries. The U.S. branch, founded in 1937, ceased operation soon after the death of Itche Goldberg on December 27, 2006.

Prominent cultural figures, such as Kalman Marmor and Nachman Meisel, saw to it that Farlag YKUF, the organization’s New York-based publishing house, issued highly regarded anthologies and studies of Yiddish literature. It published more than 250 books, including Yiddish fiction and poetry, memoirs (by Reuben Brainin, among others), history, and anthologies such as America in Yiddish Literature (1961). The U.S. YKUF began publishing the journal Yidishe Kultur in 1938, initially a monthly, in recent decades it appeared bimonthly or seven times a year. Meisel, who was not a Communist Party member and had edited a Polish literary magazine, became its first editor; in 1964, he was succeeded by Itche Goldberg, who edited it since that time to 2004. With Goldberg's death, the magazine ceased publication.

The political roots of YKUF were more of historical note than ideological tendency in its last decades. In the mid-1990s, contact and rapprochement developed between YKUF and its historically socialist counterpart organization, the Congress for Jewish Culture, also based in New York, as well as the Congress’s publication, Zukunft ("Future"). They subsequently cooperated in such activities as commemorations of the Warsaw Ghetto Uprising, and memorials for the Soviet-Yiddish writers murdered in August 1952 in Moscow 's Lubyanka prison.

== See also ==
- The Workmen's Circle/Arbeter Ring
- International Workers Order
- Habonim Dror
