= Camp Kinderland =

Summer camp in Massachusetts, United States

Camp Kinderland is a summer camp located in Tolland, Massachusetts, for youngsters aged eight through sixteen. The camp's motto is summer camp with a conscience since 1923. The main topics of the curriculum are: equality, peace, community, social justice, activism, civil rights, Yiddishkeit, and friendship. Campers may stay for four weeks in July, three weeks in August, or all seven of the offered weeks. There is also a two-week session available for first-time campers in the youngest group.

== Founding and history ==
Kinderland was founded by members of The Workmen's Circle/Arbeter Ring, a leftist Jewish fraternal organization, in 1923 in Hopewell Junction, New York. As a result of internecine conflicts between organizers of the camp who were closer to the Socialist Party and others who were closer to the Communist Party, there was a serious breach within the Yiddish-speaking Jewish left, one side pro-Communist, one side anti-Communist. As a result, there were starting in 1927, two different camps, Camp Kinderland, in the pro-Communist sector, which was run by a pro-Communist Yiddishist Jewish organization, and Camp Kinder Ring, which continued as the camp of The Workmen's Circle/Arbeter Ring. As of 2026, both camps still exist.

== Notable Guests ==
In the 1940s and 1950s Pete Seeger visited the camp. Paul Robeson also visited the camp in 1949. Both singers have structures named for them in the current camp.

== Politics ==
The camp's left-wing politics led it to be the place many red diaper babies were sent growing up, which caused it to be investigated during the McCarthy era. Attendee and counselor Katie Halper directed and produced Commie Camp, a light-hearted 2013 documentary on the camp.

== Notable Kinderland alumni ==
- Spencer Ackerman, progressive blogger
- Chesa Boudin, lawyer and activist; San Francisco District Attorney.
- Lawrence Bush, editor, Jewish Currents
- Jules Dassin, film director
- Delia Graff Fara, philosopher of language
- Ted Gold, a member of Weatherman Underground
- Katie Halper, comedian and writer
- Max Kellerman, sports commentator
- Michael Klonsky, education policy expert
- Harvey Kurtzman, cartoonist and founder of Mad Magazine
- Ivy Meeropol, documentary filmmaker, granddaughter of Julius and Ethel Rosenberg
- Marky Ramone, drummer, The Ramones, Misfits
- Suze Rotolo, artist and teacher
- Ben Shuldiner, 2006 Democratic candidate for New York's 19th Congressional District
- Paul Stanley, singer and guitarist, Kiss
- Sol Stern, senior fellow, Manhattan Institute
- Marisa Tomei, actress
- Merritt Wever, actress

== See also ==
- Itche Goldberg (brief mention of shules)
- Camp Boiberik
