= Marcia Falk =

American poet

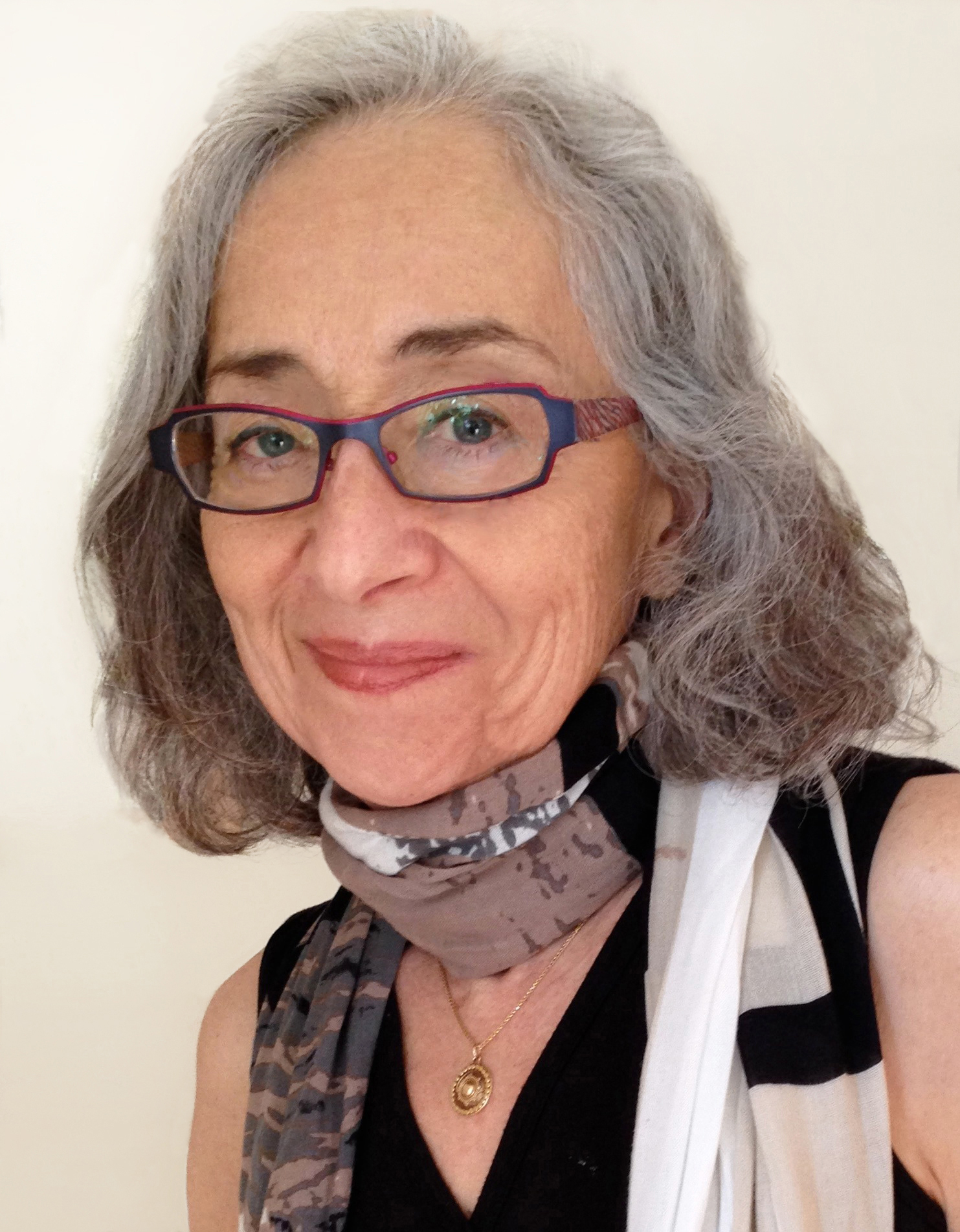
- Poet, author, artist and Judaic scholar Marcia Falk
- Born: 1946 (age 79–80); New York City
- Education: Jewish Theological Seminary of America; Brandeis University (BA in Philosophy); Stanford University (Ph.D. in English and comparative literature); Hebrew University (Fulbright Scholar in Bible and Hebrew literature)
- Spouse: Steven Jay Rood
- Website: www.marciafalk.com

Marcia Falk is a poet, liturgist, painter, and translator who has written several books of poetry and prayer.

== Early years ==
She was born in New York City and grew up in a Conservative Jewish home in New Hyde Park, Long Island. Her mother, Frieda Goldberg Falk, a teacher, spoke Yiddish fluently and attended Hebrew school as a child at her Orthodox synagogue, the only girl to do so. Her mother's influence helped inspire Falk's feminist spiritual vision and commitment to women's religious education.

Falk took classes as an adolescent in Hebrew and Jewish studies at the Jewish Theological Seminary of America. She was awarded a B.A. in philosophy magna cum laude from Brandeis University, followed by a Ph.D. in English and comparative literature from Stanford University. Falk was a Fulbright Scholar in Hebrew literature and Bible at the Hebrew University in Jerusalem, and returned four years later as a Postdoctoral Fellow.

== Life and career ==
As a university professor, Falk taught Hebrew and English literature, Jewish studies, and creative writing at Stanford University, Binghamton University, and the Claremont Colleges. In 2001 she was the Priesand Visiting Professor of Jewish Women’s Studies at Hebrew Union College in Cincinnati.

Falk is a life member of the Art Students League of New York, where she studied painting as a child and adolescent. Her painting "Gilead Apples" was used as the cover illustration for her book The Days Between: Blessings, Poems, and Directions of the Heart for the Jewish High Holiday Season. She has also created a series of mizrachs featuring her oil pastel paintings accompanied by texts from her volume of Hebrew and English prayers, The Book of Blessings.

Falk’s poems have appeared in the American Poetry Review, Choice, Moment, Poet & Critic, Poetry Society of America Magazine, Her Face in the Mirror: Jewish Women on Mothers and Daughters (Beacon Press, 1994), September 11, 2001: American Writers Respond (Etruscan Press, 2002), Voices Within the Ark: The Modern Jewish Poets (Avon Books, 1980), Fire and Rain: Ecopoetry of California (Scarlet Tanager Books, 2018), and many other magazines and anthologies. She has published three collections of her own poems: My Son Likes Weather, This Year in Jerusalem, and It Is July in Virginia. Falk is also the author of The Spectacular Difference: Selected Poems of Zelda, a volume of translations of the Hebrew poetry of twentieth-century mystic Zelda Schneerson Mishkovsky, and "With Teeth in the Earth: Selected Poems of Malka Heifetz Tussman."

The Song of Songs: Love Lyrics from the Bible, a verse translation of the biblical Song of Songs, was first published in 1977. The poet Adrienne Rich called her translation "a beautiful and sensual poem in its own right."

1996's The Book of Blessings: New Jewish Prayers for Daily Life, the Sabbath, and the New Moon Festival was acclaimed for its nongendered depictions of the divine, replacing traditional masculine terminology for God (i.e., Lord and King) with what Falk calls "new images for divinity." Writing in The Women's Review of Books, Judith Plaskow hailed the book's "extraordinarily beautiful prayers," which use "no female images and little feminine grammar. Instead, [Falk] evokes the sacred as totally immanent in creation, offering an alternative to the whole notion of God as male or female person."

The Days Between: Blessings, Poems, and Directions of the Heart for the Jewish High Holiday Season, published in 2014, takes a similar approach to the High Holy Day season, recreating the holidays’ key prayers and rituals from an inclusive perspective. Rabbi David Teutsch of the Reconstructionist Rabbinical College praised the author for demonstrating "a poet’s gift for words that open inner vistas, a liturgist’s capacity to speak to the universal, a scholar’s insight into Jewish traditions and texts, and a contemporary feminist’s fresh vision."

She published Inner East: Illuminated Poems and Blessings in 2019. In Inner East, Falk’s poems and blessings are paired with her paintings, as they are in her mizrachs. Traditionally, in Jewish communities west of the Holy Land, mizrachs are hung on an eastern wall to indicate the direction to face during prayer. “Inner east” refers to a direction of the heart, a pointer toward the spiritual core within ourselves.

In 2022, Falk published Night of Beginnings: A Passover Haggadah, the third publication in a series of feminist rewritings of Jewish liturgy.

Falk lives in Berkeley, California, with her husband, the poet Steven Jay Rood. They have one son, Abraham Gilead Falk-Rood.

== Works ==
- It Is July in Virginia: A Poem Sequence, Rara Avis Press, 1985
- This Year in Jerusalem, State Street Press, 1986 (poems)
- The Song of Songs: A New Translation and Interpretation, Harper San Francisco, 1990
- The Song of Songs: Love Lyrics from the Bible Brandeis University Press/University Press of New England, 2004 (translation and commentary)
- With Teeth in the Earth: Selected Poems of Malka Heifetz Tussman, Wayne State University Press, 1992 (translations from the Yiddish, with introduction)
- The Spectacular Difference: Selected Poems of Zelda, Hebrew Union College Press, 2004 (translations from the Hebrew, with introduction)
- The Book of Blessings: New Jewish Prayers for Daily Life, the Sabbath, and the New Moon Festival, HarperCollins, 1996; CCAR Press, 20th-anniversary edition, 2017
- The Days Between: Blessings, Poems, and Directions of the Heart for the Jewish High Holiday Season, Brandeis University Press / University Press of New England, 2014
- Inner East: Illuminated Poems and Blessings, Oak & Acorn Press, 2018
- Night of Beginnings: A Passover Haggadah, Jewish Publication Society / University of Nebraska Press, 2022
- The Sky Will Overtake You, Scarlet Tanager Books, 2025 (poems)
