= Sociology of language =

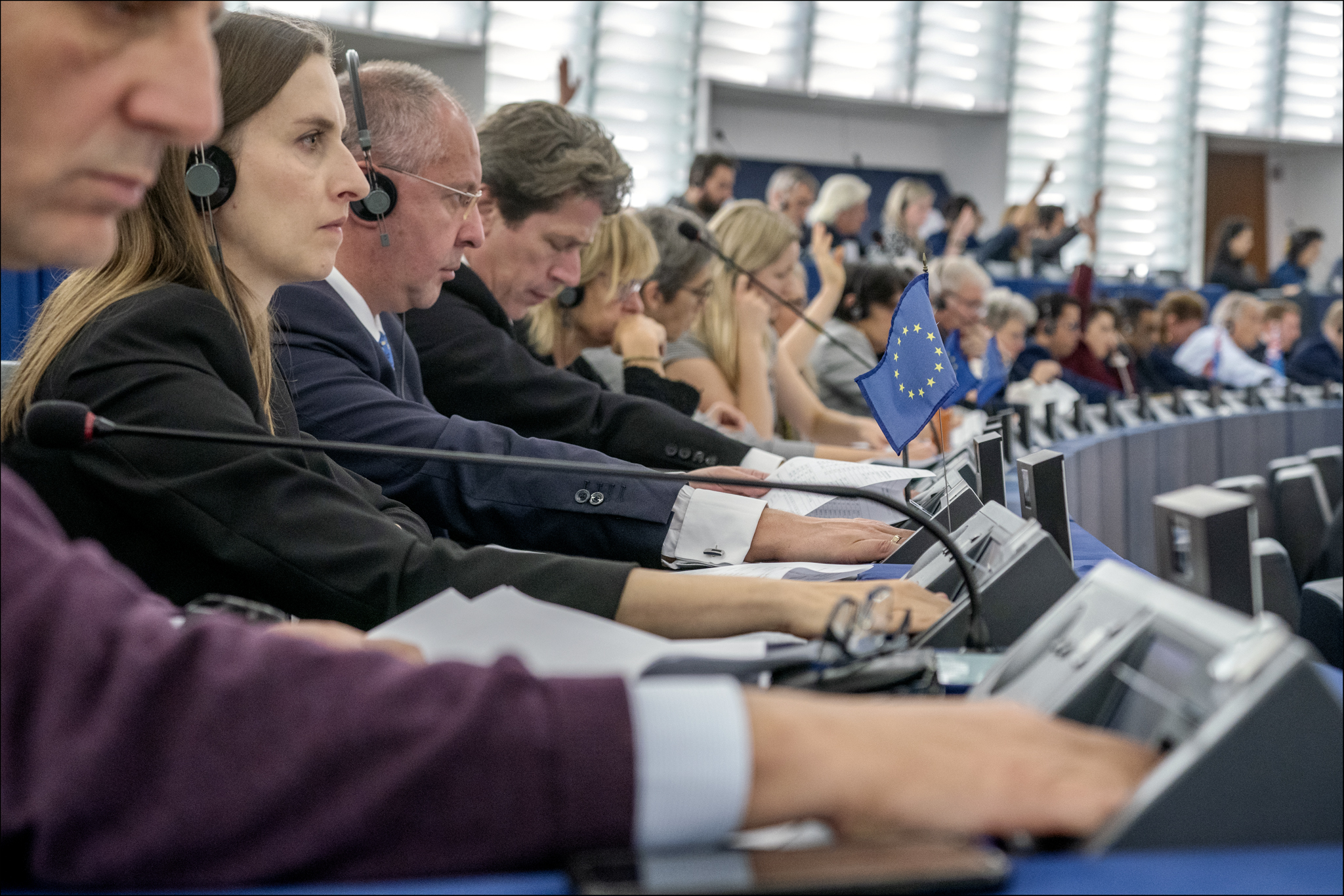
The EU has 24 languages it translates and operates within. The image shows MEPs adopting their position on the 2020 EU budget through translator communication.

Sociology of language is the study of the relations between language and society, particularly the influence of language on society.

One of the longest and most prolific practitioners of the sociology of language (also known as macrosociolinguistics) was Joshua Fishman, the founding editor of the International Journal of the Sociology of Language, in addition to other major contributions. As Trent University professor of global politics Andreas Pickel states, "religion and other symbolic systems strongly shaping social practices and shaping political orientations are examples of the social significance such languages can have." The basic idea is that language reflects, among several other things, attitudes that speakers want to exchange or that just get reflected through language use. These attitudes of the speakers are the sociologist's information.

Sociology of language seeks to understand the way that social dynamics are affected by individual and group language use. According to National Taiwan University of Science and Technology Chair of Language Center Su-Chiao Chen, language is considered to be a social value within this field, which researches social groups for phenomena like multilingualism and lingual conflict. It has to do with who is 'authorized' to use what language, with whom and under what conditions. It has to do with how an individual or group identity is established by the language that they have available for them to use. It seeks to understand individual expression, which the investment in the linguistic tools that one has access to in order to bring oneself to other people.

== Relationship with sociolinguistics ==
The sociology of language is closely related to but distinct from the field of sociolinguistics, which focuses on the influence of society on language. For the former, society is the object of study; whereas, for the latter, language is the object of study. In other words, sociolinguistics is a branch of linguistics, examining how particular languages and their dialects vary as a result of the user's sociological background, such as gender, ethnicity, and socioeconomic class.

== See also ==
- Anthropological linguistics
- Code-mixing
- Code-switching
- Linguistic anthropology
- Linguistic relativity
- Language variety
- Sociolinguistics
