= Mordechai Strigler =

American journalist

Mordechai Strigler (September 21, 1921 – May 10, 1998) was a prolific Polish-born Yiddish writer and editor of the Yiddish Forward.

Mordechai Strigler was born in 1918 to a Hasidic family in Stabrów (near Zamość, Poland)

== Childhood, adolescence and World War II ==
Mordechai Strigler was born in 1918 to a Hasidic family in Stabrów (near Zamość, Poland).

He began studying a yeshiva at a very young age and at the age of eighteen had completed his Talmudic studies in two other yeshivas (Luck, Kleck).

He also obtained a rabbi diploma.The fact that Strigler was actually born in 1918 and not, as can often be read, in 1921, is evident from the original birth certificate that his daughter was able to locate in Poland. Apparently Strigler had a penchant for specifying his year of birth as 1921. From 1937 he worked as a moral preacher in the Warsaw Great Synagogue. After the Germans invaded Poland, he tried to return to his parents. However, he failed, was captured by the Germans and spent the following years in various forced ghettos and concentration camps. From June 1943 he was then a prisoner in the Majdanek concentration camp. On July 28, 1943, he was transported from there to work camp C in Skarżysko-Kamienna by prisoner transport. It was an ammunition factory belonging to the HASAG Group, in which the prisoners without protective clothing were exposed to the picric acid used to fill underwater mines. This yellowing substance led to severe poisoning and reduced the life expectancy of the inmates to three months. He wrote about his one-year stay there during his imprisonment, but these records were lost. He was released on 11 April 1945 in Buchenwald. All in all, his ordeal led him through twelve different camps, although there is still no complete list of all “stations”.

== Emigration and journalism ==
After the end of the World War, Strigler found a job with the Yiddish magazine Undzer Vort in Paris and settled there for the next seven years. The six-volume work Oisgebrente Likht (Extinguished Lights) was written here between 1948 and 1952 in which Strigler reports on his experience of the Shoah. Strigler had been in contact with the American-Jewish poet H. Leivick since 1945. He quickly recognized its literary potential. In 1952 Strigler emigrated to the United States and became editor of the Yiddish weekly Yidischer Kemfer in New York. He worked there until 1995 and wrote countless articles under 20 pseudonyms; between 1987 and 1998, the year of his death, he also worked for the then Yiddish daily newspaper Forverts. With his wife Esther he had a daughter, Leah. On May 10, 1998, Strigler died in New York of brain injuries sustained in a fall.

== Literary work ==
In addition to his journalistic texts, Strigler also wrote poems, memoirs, political commentaries, and stories and novels. The focus of his fictional narrative texts was the life of Polish Jews before the Second World War. It was also important to him not only to depict the personal and collective experience of the camp stays during the Nazi regime in a literary way, but also to analyze it.

- Tsu Aykh Shvester un Brider Bafrayte (To my liberated sisters and brothers), 1945.
- In a Fremdn Dor: Lider un Poemen (In a strange generation: Poems and ballads), 1947.
- Majdanek, 1947 (German first edition: Majdanek. Verloschene Lichter. An early contemporary witness report from the death camp. From the Yiddish by Sigrid Beisel. Ed. By Frank Beer. Zu Klampen Verlag, Springe 2016, ISBN 978-3-86674-527-8)
- In di Fabrikn Fun Toyt, 1948 (German first edition: In den Fabriken des Todes. Verloschene Lichter II. An early contemporary witness report from the labor camp. From Yiddish by Sigrid Beisel. Ed. By Frank Beer. Zu Klampen Verlag, Springe 2017, ISBN 978-3-86674-557-5)
- Di Ershte Libe Fun Kopl Matsh: Roman (The first love of Kopl Matsh: Roman), 1948. Verk Tse (Werk C), 2 volumes, 1950 (German first edition: Werk C. Verloschene Lichter III. A contemporary witness report from the factories of death. From Yiddish by Sigrid Beisel. Ed. By Frank Beer. Zu Klampen Verlag, Springe 2019, ISBN 978-3-86674-595-7)
- Goyroles (Fates), 2 volumes, 1952.
- Georemt Mitn Vint: Historical novel Fun Yidishn Lebn in Poyln (Arm in arm with the wind: A historical novel about Jewish life in Poland), 1955. Indzlen Oyf der Erd: Noveln (Islands on Earth: Stories), 1957. Shmuesn Mit der Tsayt (Conversations with Time), 2 volumes, 1959–61.

== Prizes and awards ==
In 1978, Strigler received the Itzik Manger Prize for Yiddish Literature. In 1998 he was to be awarded an honorary doctorate in Hebrew literature from the Jewish Theological Seminary of America. A few days before the award ceremony, however, Strigler died in New York.

== Literature ==
Susanne Klingenstein: The Voice of the Survivor, in: FAZ, June 18, 2016, p. 20. Jan Schwarz: Survivors and Exiles: Yiddish culture after the Holocaust. Detroit: Wayne State Univ. Press, 2015.
