= International Journal of the Sociology of Language =

- Discipline: Sociology of language
- Language: English
- Edited by: Ofelia Garcia Otheguy

Publication details
- History: 1974-present
- Publisher: Walter de Gruyter
- Frequency: Bimonthly

Standard abbreviations
- ISO 4: Int. J. Sociol. Lang.

Indexing
- ISSN: 0165-2516 (print); 1613-3668 (web)
- LCCN: 81645517
- OCLC no.: 465877608

Links
- Journal homepage

The International Journal of the Sociology of Language is a peer-reviewed academic journal covering the field of sociology of language. It was established in 1974 by the eminent sociologist of language Joshua Fishman, who has served many years as editor-in-chief. Today, the editor is Ofelia Garcia Otheguy. Each issue focuses on a single topic within the scope of the journal's field, for example "Sociolinguistic Issues in Azerbaijan", "The Official Language Minorities in Canada" and "Jewish Language Contact". Each issue also publishes a book review and many issues also include a study relating to the sociology of endangered languages or small language communities. The journal is published by Walter de Gruyter.

The European Reference Index for the Humanities categorizes it in the "INT2" sub-category ("international publications with significant visibility and influence in the various research domains in different countries"). The journal is abstracted and indexed by International Bibliography of the Social Sciences, MLA International Bibliography, IBR Internationale Bibliographie der Rezensionen geistes- und sozial wissenschaftlicher Zeitschriftenliteratur, and Anthropological Literature.

Google Scholar calculates that the h5-index for this journal is 16, the h5-index being "the largest number h such that h articles published in 2010-2014 have at least h citations each." The h5-median score is 22; "the h5-median for a publication is the median number of citations for the articles that make up its h5-index."
