= Isaiah Spiegel =

Isaiah Spiegel (Hebrew: ישעיהו שפיגל, Polish: Jeszajahu Szpigel; January 14, 1906 – July 14, 1990) was Polish and Israeli poet, writer and essayist writing in Yiddish, a Holocaust survivor (Łódź Ghetto and Auschwitz II-Birkenau).

Before deportation from the Łódź Ghetto he hid some writing. After the war he found the manuscripts with 16 stories, recalled more of them, and published. After World War II he worked as a teacher in Łódź and wrote short stories in Yiddish. In 1951 he emigrated to Israel, where he worked as a clerk and continued writing in Yiddish.

He was one of the portrayed in the 1948 documentary Mir Lebngeblibene ("We, Who Survivied", Yiddish: מיר לעבנגעבליבענע) by Natan Gross, the last documentary in Poland shot completely in Yiddish.

== Books ==
- ישעיהו שפיגל־־פרוזה סיפורית מגיטו לודז׳ : שישה־עשר סיפורים מפוענחים על פי כתבי־יד שניצלו בצירוף מבוא וראיון עם המחבר ("Narrative prose from the Lodz Ghetto: Sixteen stories deciphered from surviving manuscripts, with an introduction and interview with the author")
- 1947: Małches geto; Łódź, short stories
  - 1998: Ghetto Kingdom: Tales of the Lodz Ghetto (translated by David H. Hirsch and Roslyn Hirsch)
- 1966: Flamen fun der erd, Tel Aviv, novel
  - 2022: Flames from the Earth: A Novel from the Lódz Ghetto (translated from Yiddish by Julian Levinson)
- 1966: Shtign cum himl (Stairway to heaven; short stories Hebrew: מדרגות אל השמים : רומן, romanized: Madregot el ha-shamayim : roman: translation from Yiddish to Hebrew)

== Awards ==
- 1972: Itzik Manger Prize in Yiddish literature
- 1975: Fichman Prize for Literature and Art (issued by the World Federation of Bessarabian Jews)
