= Yehuda Elberg =

- Born: May 15, 1912; Zgierz, Poland
- Died: October 18, 2003 (aged 91); Montreal, Quebec, Canada
- Resting place: Baron de Hirsch Cemetery, Montreal
- Spouses: Tehilla Feinerman (m. 1948; died 1955); Shaindle Stipelman Bloomstone (m. 1956; died 1987)
- Writing career
- Pen name: Y. Bergel, L. Berg
- Notable awards: Manger Prize (1977); Prime Minister's Award (1984)

Yehuda Elberg (Yiddish: יהודה עלבערג; May 15, 1912 – October 18, 2003) was a Canadian Yiddish novelist and journalist. His works have been translated into English, Spanish, Hebrew, French, German, and Hungarian.

== Biography ==
Yehuda Elberg was born into a rabbinical family in Zgierz, Poland, in 1912. His father, Avrom-Nosn Elberg, was a rabbi in Sonik and in Blashki, and his maternal grandfather, Tsvi-Yekhezkl Mikhlzon, was a prominent rabbi in Warsaw.

Elberg received a traditional religious education, receiving rabbinic ordination as a teenager, and studied textile engineering in Łódź from 1934. He began publishing stories in Yiddish- and Hebrew-language newspapers in the early 1930s, making his literary debut with the story Ber Lep in the Łódź newspaper Folks-blat. Much of his prewar writing was lost during the Holocaust.

During World War II, Elberg was active in the underground resistance movement in Łódź and the Warsaw Ghetto. He took part in the Warsaw Ghetto Uprising. Some three hundred members of his family, including his son, were murdered in the Holocaust.

After the War, Elberg worked as a correspondent for Israeli, American, and European newspapers. He became involved in Zionist causes, including the effort to smuggle Jewish refugees into Mandatory Palestine. He immigrated to Paris in 1947, and to the United States in 1948 as delegate to the first World Jewish Culture Congress, settling in New York. He worked for the Histadruth from 1951. Following the death of his first wife, in 1956 he settled in Montreal, Canada, where he would live for the rest of his life.

He died in Montreal on October 18, 2003, on the holiday of Shmini Atzeret.

== Work ==
Although Elberg published his first collection of stories, Unter kuperne himlen ("Under Copper Skies"), in 1951, most of his major literary works appeared later in life. Between 1974 and 1987 he published six novels and two collections of short stories, including The Ship of the Hunted and The Empire of Kalman the Cripple, both of which he translated into English in 1997. His story "837" was adapted for the stage by Pinkhes Bizberg and staged in Buenos Aires. In 1995, The Daily Telegraph described him as "arguably the greatest living Yiddish author"; writing in The Globe and Mail in 1997, Alberto Manguel described Elberg as "one of the great Yiddish novelists of our time" and his English translations as "unequivocal masterpieces".

Elberg received numerous awards for his literary contributions, including the 1977 Itzik Manger Prize and the 1984 Prime Minister's Award for literature in Israel.

== Selected publications ==
- Unter kuperne himlen [Under Copper Skies]. Buenos Aires: Tsentral-Farband fun Poylishe Yidn in Argentine. 1951.
- Oyfin shpitz fun a mast [On the Tip of a Mast]. New York: Shulsinger Bros. 1974. Published in English as The Ship of the Hunted in 1997.
- Tsevorfene Zangen [Scattered Stalks]. Montreal: Shula Publications. 1976.
- Mayses [Stories]. 1980.
- A mentch is Nor a Mentch [A Person is Only a Person]. Tel Aviv: I. L. Peretz Publishing House. 1983.
- Kalman kalikes imperya [The Empire of Kalman the Cripple]. Tel Aviv: Yisroel-bukh. 1983. Published in English as The Empire of Kalman the Cripple in 1997.
- In leymene hayzer [In Clay Houses]. Tel Aviv: Yisroel-bukh. 1985.
- Tsvishn morgn un ovnt [Between Morning and Evening]. Tel Aviv: Yisroel-bukh. 1987.
- Khasidic Tales. 2001.
