= Rajzel Żychlińsky =

American poet

- Born: Rajzla Żychlińska; July 27, 1910; Gąbin, Poland
- Died: June 13, 2001 (aged 90); Concord, California
- Citizenship: Poland, United States
- Education: City College of New York
- Occupation: Poet
- Spouse: Dr. Isaac Kanter (m. 1941; died 1990)
- Children: Marek Kanter, Ph.D.
- Writing career
- Notable work: God Hid His Face: Selected Poems
- Notable awards: Itzik Manger Prize (1975)

Rajzel Żychlińsky (July 27, 1910 – June 13, 2001) was a Polish-born writer of poetry in Yiddish. She published seven collections over six decades. Her first two collections were published in Warsaw, Poland in 1936 and 1939, just prior to World War II. She survived the war by fleeing eastward to the Soviet Union, but many members of her immediate family were murdered in the Holocaust. Her postwar poetry, mostly written in the United States, was strongly influenced by these events.

== Biography ==
Żychlińsky was born in Gąbin, Poland to Mordechai Żychlińsky and Debora Żychlińska (née Appel). Both her parents were Jewish. Her mother in particular was devout and descended from a family from which many rabbis had emerged. Żychlińsky completed public grade school in Gąbin in 1923. Gąbin had no higher schools for girls, but she continued her education through private tutors. By then Żychlińsky was writing poetry in Polish and in Yiddish. Her first poem to be published appeared about 1927 in the Folkstsaytung, which was a Yiddish-language daily newspaper in Warsaw, Poland's largest city. In the early 1930s, Żychlińsky moved to Włocławek; she worked there in an orphanage. By 1936 she was working at a bank in Warsaw. Her first book of poems, Lider [Poems], was published in 1936 by the Yiddish PEN Club. It had an introduction by one of her mentors, the noted Polish poet and playwright Itzik Manger. In 1937, she won the Reuben Ludwig Award of the Yiddish-American literary publication Inzikh. In early 1939 her second book, Der regn zingt [The Rain Sings], was published in Warsaw.

Germany initiated World War II by invading Poland from the west on September 1, 1939, and the Soviet Union invaded from the east sixteen days later. Żychlińsky and friends hired a cab and, for an extraordinary payment of 400 złoty, had the driver drive them east to the Bug River. There she had a boat take her across the river into the zone of Soviet-occupied Poland, near Białystok. Most of the poet's family remained in the German-occupied zone. Żychlińsky's mother, along with her sister Chaneh, her brothers Yakov and Dovid, and their children, were ultimately murdered in the gas chambers of the Treblinka and Chełmno extermination camps. She lived in Lvov (L’viv) for a time. She then moved to Kolomyya, where she lived with the Kanter family. In January, 1941 she married Isaac Kanter. Isaac Kanter was a well-read psychiatrist who also wrote; he knew Żychlińsky from Warsaw. The German invasion of the Soviet Union commenced in June, 1941. Żychlińsky and her husband fled eastward again, ultimately landing near Kazan. Isaac Kanter served as a doctor in the Soviet army during the war. On February 15, 1943, their son, Marek, was born.

After the war in 1945, Żychlińsky and her family returned to Poland. She published her third volume of poetry, Tsu loytere bregn [To Clear Shores], there in 1948. It would be fifteen years before she published the fourth. In 1948 the family moved to Paris, France. They had found postwar Poland to be unwelcoming to the return of Jewish survivors of the Holocaust. Finally, in 1951 she and her family emigrated to the United States, and lived in Manhattan and in Brooklyn. There she found work, and, at the same time, attended City College of New York. Subsequently, she and her family resided in various parts of the United States, including Florida and California, as well as spending some time in Canada.

Żychlińsky was fluent in five languages. After the war and the nearly total elimination of the Yiddish-speaking communities in Europe, she continued to write exclusively in Yiddish. Karina von Tippelskirch writes, "Zychlinsky wrote poems only in Yiddish, the mameloshn—her mother tongue. It linked the poet and her mother, and it remains the language that can carry the Eastern European Jewish world beyond its destruction by the Holocaust into the present." Von Tippelskirch also wrote: "Rajzel Zychlinsky (1910–2001) is considered one of the greatest Yiddish poets of the 20th century and a master of the small poetic form."

Żychlińsky was awarded the Itzik Manger Prize for contributions to Yiddish letters at a ceremony in Tel Aviv on June 9, 1975. Nonetheless, she is not famous even in Yiddish-speaking circles. Elvira Groezinger writes, "The reason for Zychlinsky's incomprehensible lack of fame may be traced to her life choices. She was not part of the mainstream of Yiddish poets, publishers, and influential people. ... Having no networks to support her career, she remained a lifelong loner and outsider." Barnett Zumoff writes that "she was the most authentic and original of the female Yiddish poets."

== "God Hid His Face" ==
The volume of English translations takes its title from the poem "God Hid His Face", which has been called "one of her most powerful and desolate." von Tippelskirch considers the poem in the larger context of faith in god following the Holocaust: "Like many writers after the Holocaust, among them Itzik Manger and Zvi Kolitz (1946) in his famous 'Yosl Rakover Talks to God', Zychlinsky struggles with faith, often referring to God as blind or absent." The poem's title also appears in Zvi Kolitz' text.

In English translation by Aaron Kramer:

God Hid His Face
All the roads led to death,
all the roads.

All the winds breathed betrayal,
all the winds.

At all the doorways angry dogs barked,
at all the doorways.

All the waters laughed at us,
all the waters.

All the nights fattened on our dread,
all the nights.

And the heavens were bare and empty,
all the heavens.

God hid his face.

== Bibliography ==
=== Poetry collections ===
Żychlińsky published seven collections of her poetry:

- Lider [Poems] (in Yiddish). Warsaw: National Yiddish Book Center. 1936. With an introduction by Itsik Manger.
- Der regn zingt [The Rain Sings] (in Yiddish). Warsaw: Yidishn P.E.N. Klub. 1939. OCLC 41122814.
- Tsu loytere bregn [To Clear Shores] (in Yiddish). Lodz: Farlag yidish-bukh. 1948. OCLC 10708461.
- Shvaygndike tirn [Silent Doors] (in Yiddish). New York: Jidiš P.E.N.-Klub. 1963. OCLC 970955001.
- Harbstike skwern [Autumn Squares] (in Yiddish). New York: Nju-Jork Tziko-Farl. 1966. OCLC 19312290.
- Di November-zun [The November Sun] (in Yiddish). Paris: IMPR:IMPO. 1978. OCLC 13568463.
- Naye lider [New Poems] (in Yiddish). Tel Aviv: Farlag yisroel-bukh. 1993. OCLC 746577567.

=== English translations ===
A volume of translations of her poems has been published in English:

- God Hid his Face. Selected Poems. Translated by Barnett Zumoff; Aaron Kramer; Marek Kanter; et al. Santa Rosa, CA: Word & Quill Press. 1997. ISBN 9780965864008. OCLC 749287139. Introductory essay by Emanuel S. Goldsmith.

Translations of her poetry into English have been included in several anthologies:

- Dafner, Alex, ed. (October 2011). "Reyzl Zykhlinsky". Anthology of Yiddish Poetry of Poland between the Two World Wars (1918 - 1939). Miriam Leberstein (English translations). This online anthology includes English translations for thirteen of Żychlińsky's prewar poems.
- Kramer, Aaron, ed. (1989). A Century of Yiddish Poetry. Cornwall Books. ISBN 9780845348154. OCLC 1020485790.
- Kramer, Aaron, ed. (1998). The Last Lullaby: Poetry from the Holocaust. Translated by Aaron Kramer. Saul Lishinsky (illustrations). Syracuse, NY: Syracuse University Press. ISBN 9780815604785. OCLC 469653554. With 26 poems, Żychlińsky is the best-represented poet in this anthology. It was published after Kramer's death.
- Zumoff, Barnett (2005). Songs to a Moonstruck Lady: Women in Yiddish Poetry. Toronto: TSAR Publication. p. xiii. ISBN 9781894770279. OCLC 255333733. Bilingual collection of poems in the original Yiddish and in English translation by Zumoff. Includes "My Mother".

=== Polish translations ===
Polish translations of some poems appear in the anthology:

- Antologia poezji żydowskiej [Anthology of Jewish Poetry] (in Polish). Translated by Salomon Łastik; Arnold Słucki. Warsaw: Państwowy Instytut Wydawniczy. 1986. ISBN 9788306008654. OCLC 830203050.

=== German translations ===
- Vogelbrot: Gedichte aus fünf Jahrzehnten [Bread for the Birds: Five Decades of Poetry] (in German). Translated by Hubert Witt. Leipzig: Insel-Verlag. 1981. OCLC 81134645.
- Karina Kranhold; Siegfried Heinrichs, eds. (1997). Gottes blinde Augen [God Hid His Face] (in Yiddish and German). Translated by Karina Kranhold. Chemnitz: Oberbaum. ISBN 9783928254274. OCLC 46866172. Karina von Tippelskirch's name was formerly Kranhold.
- Hubert Witt, ed. (2002). die lider / Die Gedichte 1928–1991 [Poems 1928–1991] (in Yiddish and German). Translated by Hubert Witt. Frankfurt am Main: Zweitausendeins. ISBN 9783861504481. OCLC 57145283.

=== French translations ===
- Portes Muettes [Silent Doors] (in French). Translated by Rachel Ertel. France: L'Improviste. 2007. ISBN 9782913764347. OCLC 190797239. Translation of Żychlińsky's volume Shvaygndike tirn. The translator Rachel Ertel has been called "unquestionably the most distinguished scholar of Yiddish culture in France".

=== Monographs ===
- von Tippelskirch, Karina (2000). "Also das Alphabet vergessen?" Die jiddische Dichterin Rajzel Zychlinski ["Is the Alphabet also forgotten?" The Yiddish poet Rajzel Zychlinski] (in German). Marburg: Tectum Verlag. ISBN 9783828881419. OCLC 883531219. Based on von Tippelskirch's 1997 doctoral dissertation.

== See also ==
- Yiddish literature
- List of Yiddish language poets
