= Tussman Experimental College =

The Tussman Experimental College was an American educational project at the University of California, Berkeley founded by philosophy professor Joseph Tussman, lasting from 1965 to 1969. It was inspired by the University of Wisconsin Experimental College founded by Alexander Meiklejohn. It was housed in the former Beta Theta Pi fraternity house at 2607 Hearst Avenue, which had been recently vacated by the fraternity and purchased by the university. After the Experimental College Program was disbanded in 1969, the house was subsequently occupied by UC Berkeley's newly-formed Goldman School of Public Policy.

As part of the program, about 300 students were chosen through a combination of selective interviews and academic standing. The syllabus focused on big problems and cultural crisis periods in history which had driven great thinkers to tackle fundamental questions. Emphasis was given to primary sources. Grades were not given.
