= Lev Berinski =

Israeli translator and poet

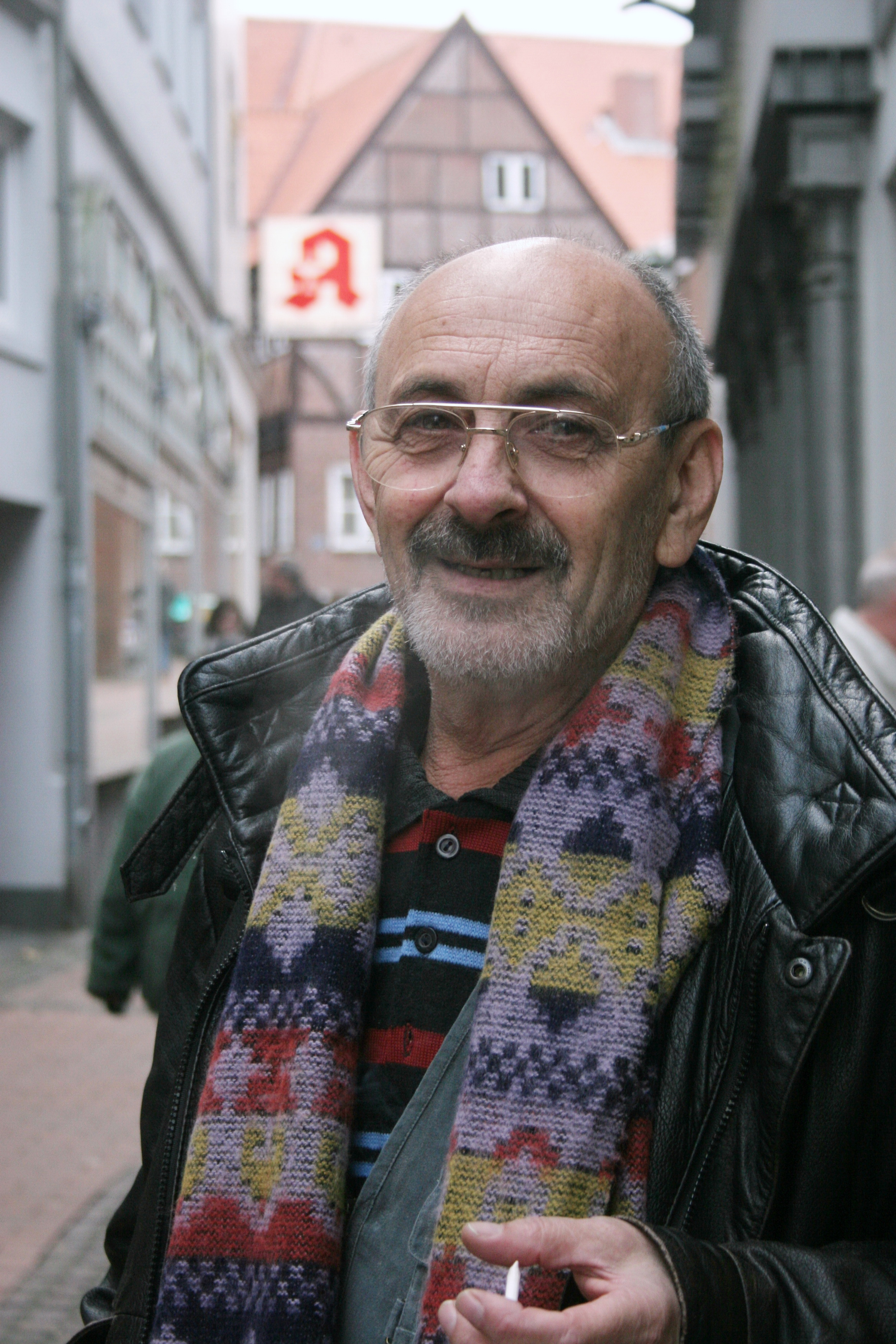
Photo, 2008

Lev Berinski (Yiddish: לעװ בערינסקי, Russian: Лев Беринский; Căușeni, Kingdom of Romania, April 6, 1939) is an Israeli translator and poet, writing in Yiddish and Russian.

== Life ==
He was born into a Jewish family in Bessarabia (then in the Kingdom of Romania and in a year annexed by the USSR); his father, Shmil Berinski, was a tailor.

During World War II, he was taken to Tajikistan and to Zlatoust, in the Urals. Upon his return to Kishinev, he met intellectuals such as Valeriu Gagiu, Alexander Gelman or Alexander Brodsky.

From 1954, he lived in Stalino (Donetsk), and after training (1957-1959) at the Technical School as a cultural employee, he worked as an accordionist and a music teacher.

He joined a group of local poets, was a close friend of the Ukrainian poet Vasyl Stus and published in the newspaper Komsomolets Donbassa.

Berinsky lived and worked in Kishinev again in 1960-1961. Afterwards, he returned to Donetsk. From 1963 to 1968 he studied at the Smolensk Pedagogical Institute and translation at the Maxim Gorky Literature Institute. From 1970 to 1974 he taught German at the Moscow Trade Union Technical Institute.

He has lived in Israel since 1991.
