= Camp Kinder Ring =

Jewish summer camp in New York, US

- Front gate to Camp Kinder Ring (2006)
- Interactive map of Camp Kinder Ring
- Location: Hopewell Junction, New York
- Coordinates: 41°36′20″N 73°44′23″W
- Type: Jewish summer camp
- Established: 1927
- Website: www.campkr.com

Camp Kinder Ring is a nonprofit 501(c)(3), Jewish summer camp located in Hopewell Junction, New York, accredited by the American Camp Association.

== History ==
Camp Kinder Ring was founded in 1927 by The Workers Circle (formerly known as The Workmen's Circle, Yiddish Der Arbeter Ring). On September 28, 2023, The Camp and The Worker's Circle announced that they were separating and that both organizations will continue to operate independently.

Many families have been attending for up to four generations.

Kinder ring (Children's Circle) was the name of a short-lived publication in the early 1920s.

== Description ==
The camp lies near the Catskills in Dutchess County, New York, about a mile from the town of Beekman. It offers campers a wide array of activities such as sports, arts and crafts, and lake activities while also educating them about Jewish traditions and culture.

The camp is divided into a boys' side and a girls' side, each having its own distinct set of staff. There are head counselors and assistant head counselors for both girls and boys. There are then eight divisions, each led by a group leader who has a staff of counselors, typically between three and six strong.

== Traditions ==
Kinder Ring's traditions include a July 4 carnival, KR of the Week/Year, Behind the Scenes, all-whites shtiller ovnt (Yiddish for "silent evening") to celebrate the Friday evening advent of the sabbath, and the setting of candles onto Sylvan Lake symbolizing the end of another summer. Other traditions include popular Jewish singers like Rick Recht. New events are created every year.

Traditional games include:

- Maccabean Games: The Mikhl Baran Maccabean Games, or Mac Games, are held every year in the first half of the summer. Campers are split into two teams named after important and influential Jews in history. Over the course of 4 days, campers compete against one another. The emphasis of Mac Games is team spirit, teamwork, and fun, rather than winning.
- Olympics: Olympics are held every year in the second half of the summer. Campers are split into teams named for two countries. Over the course of four days, campers compete against one another. As always, emphasis is based on team spirit, teamwork, and fun, rather than winning. Olympics hold the most famous events in camp, the Rope Burn, the Decathlon and the Triathlon.
- Torchbearer: This KR tradition was started in 1971. It is known as the greatest honor one can receive at Kinder Ring, showing one's love and dedication to Camp Kinder Ring. During the Opening Ceremonies for Olympics, past Torchbearers come back to camp to help pass on the honor. Every summer, a Torchbearer is named before the entire camp and lights the Olympic flame, as in the real Olympics.

== Notable alumni ==
- Dean Blandino (born 1971), former NFL vice president of officiating, now a Fox sports analyst
- Barbara Boxer (born 1940), U.S. Senator from California
- Bill Freiberger, Emmy-nominated television writer
- Adam Schefter (born 1966), ESPN NFL Insider
- Lawrence S. Wittner (born 1941), American historian – camper and counselor

== Legacy ==
Camp Kinder Ring appears in many books on Jewish culture in America, including Raising Reds (1999), The Lower East Side Remembered and Revisited (2009), Children's Nature (2010), Yiddishkeit (2012) and The Remembered and Forgotten Jewish World (2018).

Camp Kinder Ring also appears in memoirs, including The Way Home (2006), Goy Crazy (2006) and Working for Peace and Justice (2006).

== See also ==
- Camp Boiberik
- Camp Hemshekh
- Camp Kinderland (breakaway)
