= Joseph Tussman =

American educator

Joseph Tussman (4 December 1914 – 21 October 2005) was an American educator. He was chair of the philosophy department at University of California, Berkeley, a prominent educational reformer, and a key figure in the campus controversy over the 1950s loyalty oath.

Tussman was born in Chicago and grew up in Milwaukee. His father, Shleime Tussman, was a second-generation cantor, and his mother, Malka Heifetz Tussman, was an eminent Yiddish poet. He studied under Alexander Meiklejohn at the University of Wisconsin–Madison. Following his graduation from Wisconsin, he followed his mentor west to do graduate work at Berkeley.

He served in an army-intelligence unit in southwest China during World War II. After his discharge, he returned to Berkeley. California began to require University employees to sign a loyalty oath in the 1950s, and Tussman was a key organizer of protests. Twenty percent of the Berkeley faculty refused to sign, and 31 professors were dismissed. Being untenured, however, Tussman eventually signed the oath for economic reasons. He said it was the saddest day in his life.

Tussman moved to the philosophy department in 1952, leaving in 1955 when denied tenure for insufficient scholarly publication. Over the next few years he taught at Syracuse and Wesleyan and completed his first book, Obligation and the Body Politic. He returned to Berkeley in 1963 and became chair of philosophy the following year. He was a key figure in the Free Speech Movement of 1964.

In 1965, Tussman founded the Tussman Experimental College Program (modeled on a program that Meiklejohn had created at Madison), which was offered to 150 students through their freshman and sophomore years and focused on great works written during times of great upheaval. The experiment lasted four years. He then continued to teach in the philosophy department until his retirement in 1983.

== Publications ==
- Obligation and the Body Politic (1960)
- Government and the Mind (1977)
- The Burden of Office: Agamemnon and Other Losers (1989)
- The Beleaguered College (1997)
