= Joseph Bovshover =

Russian-American poet

- יוסף באָװשאָװער
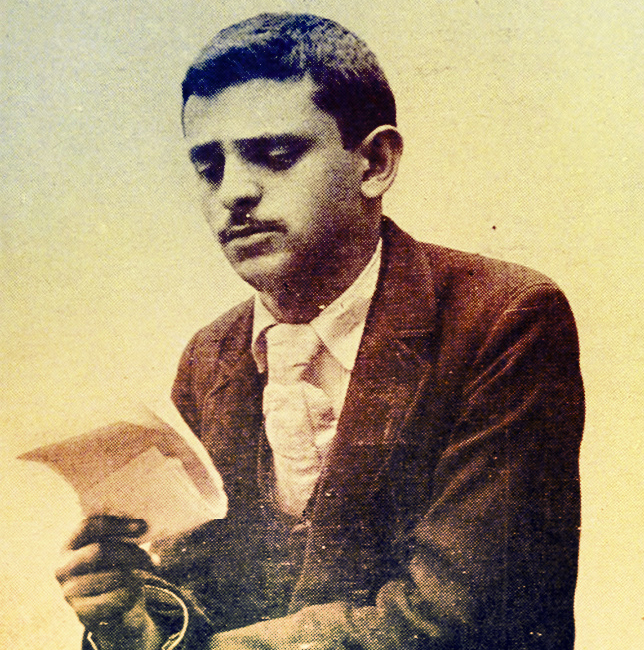
- Bovshover in 1911
- Born: September 30, 1873; Lyubavichi, Mogilev Governorate, Russian Empire
- Died: December 25, 1915 (aged 42); Poughkeepsie, New York, U.S.
- Other names: Basil Dahl, M. Turbov
- Occupations: Poet; essayist; translator
- Movement: Anarcho-communism

Joseph Bovshover (Yiddish: יוסף באָװשאָװער; September 30, 1873 – December 25, 1915), also known under pseudonyms Basil Dahl and M. Turbov, was a Yiddish poet, essayist, and translator of Russian-Jewish descent. Emma Goldman described him in her autobiography Living My Life as being a "high-strung and impulsive man of exceptional poetic gifts."

Bovshover left his home in Lyubavichi for Riga at a young age, where he studied German and became interested in the work of Heinrich Heine. At 18 years of age, Bovshover immigrated to the United States, where he established a place in the American anarchist movement.

While initially inspired by other "sweatshop poets" such as Morris Rosenfeld and David Edelstadt, Bovshover later developed his own unique style influenced by American poets like Walt Whitman.

== Selected works ==
- Poetishe verk (Yiddish: פּאָעטישע װערק; "Poetic works") (1903)
- Lider un gedikhte (Yiddish: לידער און געדיכטע; "Songs and poems") (1907)
- Bilder un gedanken (Yiddish: בילדער און געדאַנקען; "Pictures and ideas") (1907)
- Gezamlte shriftn: poezye un proze (Yiddish: געזאַמלטע שריפֿטן׃ פּאָעזיע און פּראָזע; "Collected writings: poetry and prose") (1911, reprinted in 1916)
- Shaylok (1911–1912)
- Geklibene lider (Yiddish: געקליבענע לידער; "Collected poems") (1918 and 1931)
- To the Toilers and Other Verses (1928)
- Lider (Yiddish: לידער; "Poems") (1930)
- Lider un dertseylungen (Yiddish: לידער און דערצײלונגען; "Poems and stories") (1939)
