= The Workers Circle =

American Jewish nonprofit organization

- Formation: September 4, 1900; 126 years ago
- Founded at: New York City
- Type: NGO
- Legal status: 501c3 nonprofit
- Purpose: support Jewish culture and social-economic justice
- Headquarters: New York City
- Official language: English, Yiddish
- President: Richard Rumelt
- VP Development: Jay Sackman
- VP Strategy: Bernice Siegal
- Treasurer: David Kazansky
- Board of directors: Peter Pepper (past president), Richard Brook, Zeev Dagan, Michelle Green, Michael Kaminer, Irena Klepfisz, Eric Marshall, Dan Opatoshu, Edgar Romney, Eva Zasloff
- Key people: Ann Toback, CEO; Melissa Karachalios, Director of Development and External Affairs; Jonathan Gold, Director of Finance; Kolya Borodulin, Director of Yiddish Programming; Noelle Damico, Director of Social Justice
- Website: circle.org

The Workers Circle or Der Arbeter Ring (Yiddish: דער אַרבעטער־רינג), formerly The Workmen's Circle, is an American Jewish nonprofit organization that promotes social and economic justice, Jewish community and education, including Yiddish studies, and Ashkenazic culture. It operates schools and Yiddish education programs, and year-round programs of concerts, lectures and secular holiday celebrations. The organization has community branch offices throughout North America, with a national headquarters in New York City.

It has EIN 13-6178558 as a 501(c)(3) Public Charity; in 2024, it claimed total revenue of $3,779,882 and total assets of $36,462,120. It filed the mission statement: "The Workmen's Circle is a social justice organization that powers progressive Jewish identity through Jewish cultural engagement, Yiddish language learning, multigenerational education, and activism."

Formed in 1900 by Yiddish-speaking Jewish immigrants from Eastern Europe, The Workmen's Circle at first acted as a mutual aid society, helping its members to adapt to their new life in America. It provided life insurance, unemployment relief, healthcare, social interaction, burial assistance and general education through its branches throughout the US as well as through its national office. Soon, the organization was joined by more politically focused socialist Bundists who advocated the anti-assimilationist idea of Yiddish cultural autonomy, led by education in Yiddish and socialist ideals. The Circle formed the Folksbiene Yiddish theatre troupe and promoted Jewish arts and music, Yiddish school programs for children and Yiddish summer camps. It became influential in the American labor movement and grew to serve more than 84,000 members through hundreds of branches around North America. It also became involved with the Yiddish newspaper The Forward and operated old-age homes, medical clinics and other services.

Politically, the Circle moved away from socialism towards liberalism by the time of the New Deal. By the 1960s, the Circle's membership began to decline, as Jews joined the middle class and moved from cities to suburbs; the Circle no longer seemed as essential to many as it had been. In the new century, the organization ended its direct health insurance program, streamlined its operations, separated from The Forward, and rededicated its mission to education and promoting Jewish community, secular Yiddish culture and social justice activism. It sold its former East side building and moved to new offices in the Garment District of New York City in 2011. The Workers Circle is a nonprofit 501(c)(3) organization.

== History ==
=== Inception to 1930 ===
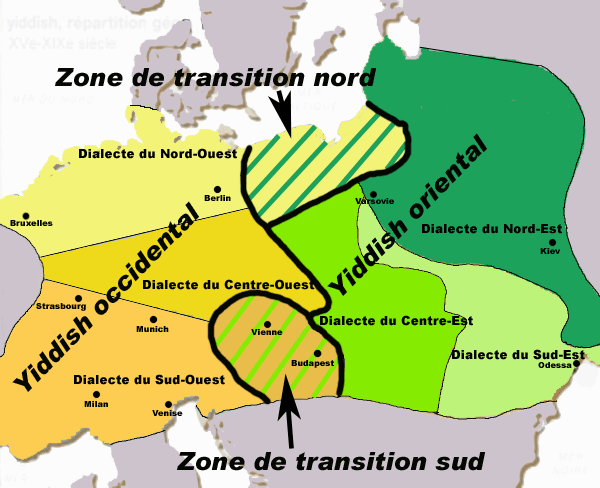
The Workers Circle promotes Yiddish language – here, its dialects in Eastern Europe (15th–19th centuries).

With the pogroms in the 1880s and succeeding decades, more than 2 million Yiddish-speaking Jews fled Eastern Europe with their families, and most immigrated to the United States, many to New York City. They usually arrived penniless, and the bulk of them entered the fast-growing, but exploitative garment industry. Others found work as peddlers, jewelers, launderers, Hebrew tutors and even shopkeepers. To assist each other in adapting to their challenging new life in America, they formed several mutual aid societies.

The Workingmen's Circle Society of New York formed in 1892 thanks to the efforts of two Jewish cloak makers. The Workmen's Circle was established in New York City on September 4, 1900, as a national organization. The group held its first convention in 1901. It immediately provided to its members life insurance, some unemployment relief, healthcare, social interaction such as dances, and financial assistance in obtaining a graveyard plot. It also held general education sessions on the natural sciences and had the generally pro-labor and socialist goal "of helping to develop in working people a sense of solidarity, a clear, enlightened outlook, the striving, by means of their unity, to acquire that influence in ultimately, bringing on the day of their complete emancipation from exploitation and oppression." Unlike other mutual aid groups, the organization had a workers' social agenda that it took seriously. It "agitated to abolish child labor, establish social security and shorten the work day."

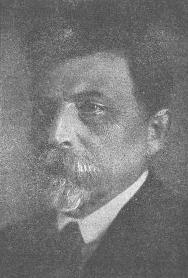
Chaim Zhitlowsky (1865–1943) inspired formation of The Workers Circle.

The organization began to form a national network of autonomous branches soon after its founding, chartered through the national organization, that provided services to their local members. From 1905, greatly increased Jewish immigration to the US, following new pogroms in Russia, brought to America large numbers of politically sophisticated socialist Bundists. The Bundists advocated the anti-Zionist, anti-assimilationist idea of Yiddish cultural autonomy and a secular Jewish identity, led by education in Yiddish language and literature, socialist ideals, Jewish history and ethical and aesthetic culture, an idea championed by Chaim Zhitlowsky. Many of the Bundists joined The Workmen's Circle and pushed it both to fight exploitative labor practices and to expand its national activities toward Yiddish education and to focus on Yiddish culture, rather than simply providing financial aid. Many of the older members argued that the organization could barely afford to provide its traditional aid to members; this discussion continued for two decades. Zhitlowsky and the Bundists succeeded in persuading the organization to establish a range of cultural activities meant to inform and express the secular Jewish spirit, such as the Folksbiene Yiddish theatre troupe (1915), Yiddish book publishing, orchestras, and art expositions sponsored by the branches around the country, Yiddish after school programs for children and teens (beginning in 1918), adult lecture circuits, Camp Kinderland (1923) and the organization's own literary and political journal, The Friend, and Unser Schul (Our School), a monthly pedagogical journal for the teachers in its schools.

In the meantime, especially after a series of garment workers' strikes in New York beginning in 1910, the Circle became influential in the American labor movement through the United Hebrew Trades, later helping to found the Jewish Labor Committee. Members of The Workers Circle helped found such labor unions as the International Ladies Garment Workers Union and the Amalgamated Clothing Workers of America.

At the same time, the Workmen's Circle continued its role as a mutual aid society. In 1917 it adopted the National Fraternal Congress of America mortuary table, and by 1920 it established a sanatorium for tuberculosis patients at Liberty, New York, where members could receive free treatment for nine months. In the 1920s, the organization reached its peak of 84,000 members, 125 schools nationwide and numerous branches nationwide; for example, the Philadelphia district had 17 branches in 1924. But during that decade, members of The Workmen's Circle sympathetic to the Communist Party initiated a power-struggle in the Circle's national organization and many of its branches around the country, but they were rejected in 1929 and formed a separate organization, taking with them about 5,000 members and some of the Circle's establishments, like Camp Kinderland.

=== 1930s to 2000 ===
The Workers Circle operates Camp Kinder Ring (here, front gate, 2006).

In 1930, the International Workers Order split off from The Workmen's Circle as a parallel Communist fraternal benefit society.

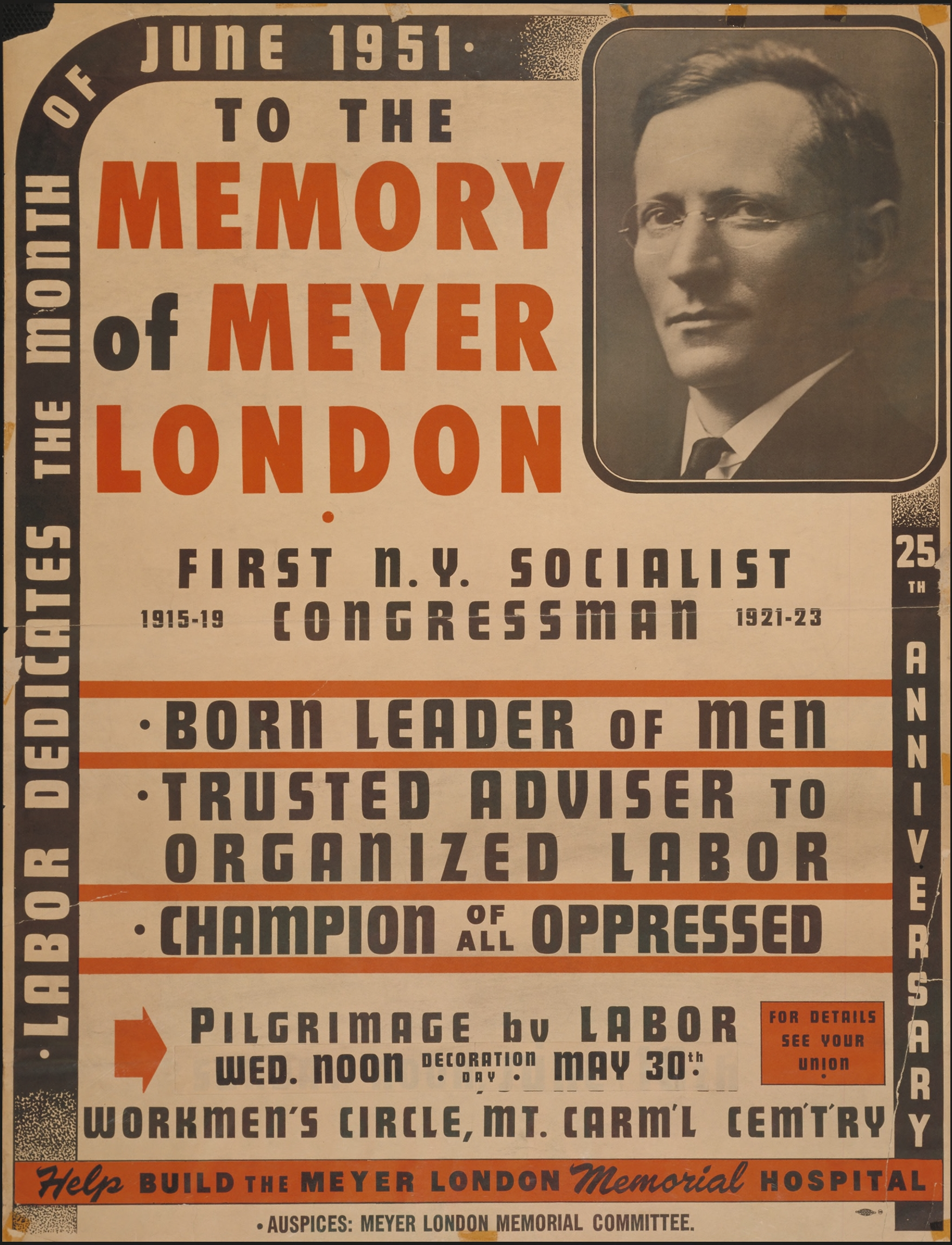
Workmen's Circle poster commemorating the 25th anniversary of the death of Socialist Party Congressman Meyer London, June 1951

In the middle of the 20th century, The Workmen's Circle continued to operate old age homes and medical clinics and offer burial assistance, affordable health and life insurance; it established Camp Kinder Ring to replace Camp Kinderland (and some branches also operated camps); and it continued to have a hand in operating the Yiddish-language newspaper The Forward, which shared its office building in New York. The organization continued to emphasize Yiddish education and the arts (klezmer music; Folksbiene theatre; choral groups), mutual aid and social interaction. It also emphasized social justice, such as efforts to oppose the repression of Soviet Jewry, and support of humanitarian relief efforts, as its political perspective had moved away from socialism towards liberalism by the time of the New Deal, and its members enthusiastically supported America's entry into World War II and even became pro-Israel. In 1949, the Workmen's Circle included 700 local branches with 70,000 members in the United States and Canada.

Beginning by the 1960s, the Circle's membership slowly declined, reaching a level of about 50,000 members by the 1980s. When the federal Medicare program began in 1966, the Circle's healthcare programs became less urgently needed. More generally, as its then-president Dr. Barnett Zumhoff explained to The New York Times in 1985, with the opening up opportunities for Jews in American society, and their move into the middle class and dispersion geographically from cities to suburbs and small towns, the Circle was no longer as essential to the Jewish community as it had been. Its membership was no longer predominantly workers, but had become small-business owners, professionals and schoolteachers. Still, the Circle believed that it offered a secular alternative to synagogue attendance and Zionist groups in its preservation of Ashkenazic Yiddish culture.

By 1996, the Circle's membership had declined to 28,000. By then, it considered itself the only organization promoting Eastern European Yiddish culture. It continued to teach Yiddish language and literature, to promote secular Jewish community and Jewish arts, music and culture, to provide its aid and insurance programs, to operate its old age homes, schools, camps and to host "holiday observances interpreting Jewish history in the traditionally secular Workmen's Circle spirit." It also continued its liberal agenda, supporting universal health care, for example. Its then-president, Mark Mlotek, noted: "this is an organization that says that the language of the murdered people in Eastern Europe was Yiddish ... there is a vibrant Yiddish culture [that] has to be maintained. Without it, a heart and soul will really go away."

=== 21st century ===
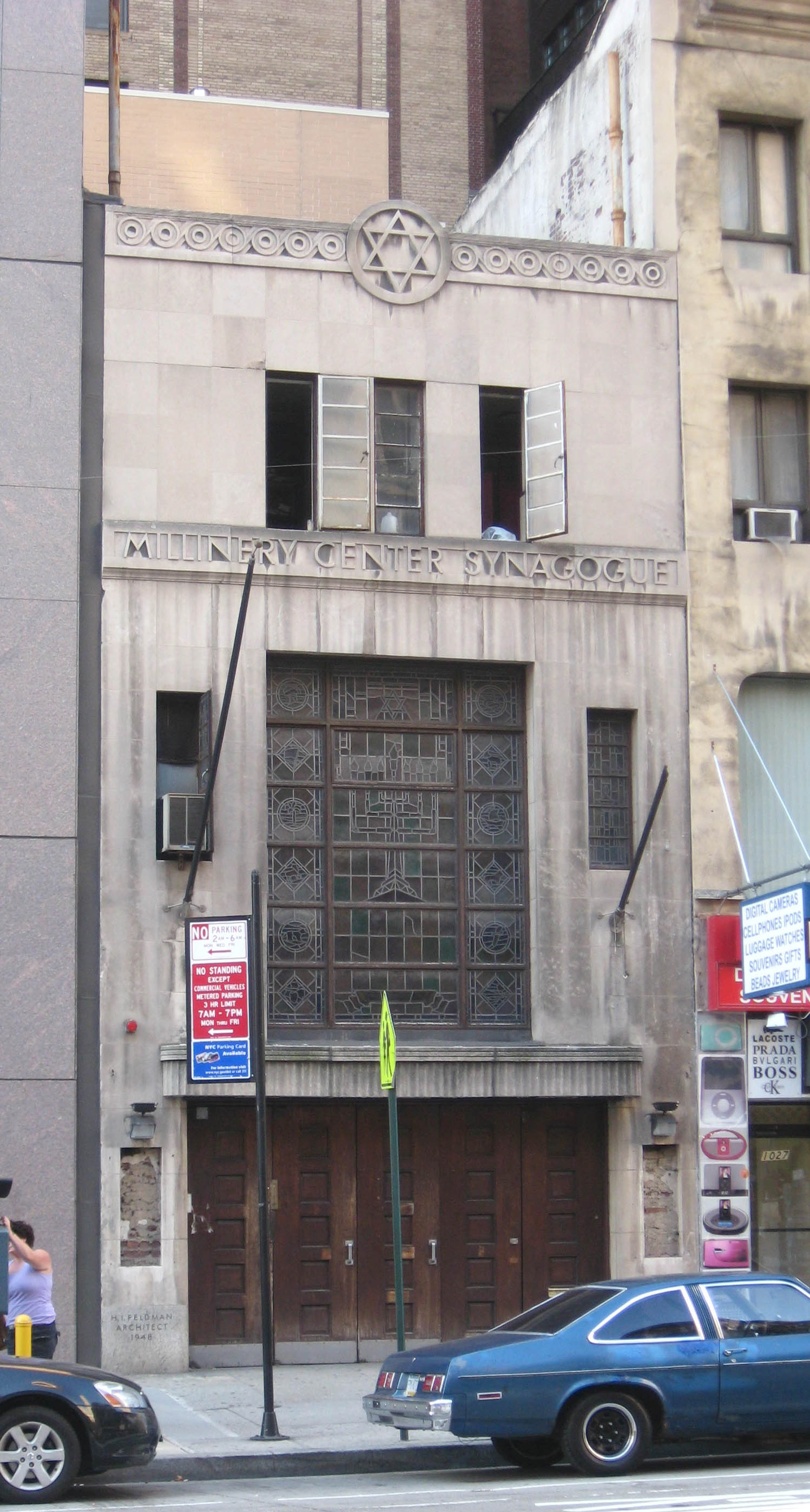
The Workers Circle now resides in the Garment District, Manhattan near the Millinery Center Synagogue on Sixth Avenue (here, circa 2008).

In the first decade of the 21st century, the organization ended its direct health insurance program and closed its old age homes, streamlined its operations, and separated itself from The Forward. The organization hired a new executive director, Ann Toback, in 2008, reorganized its board and appointed a new president, Madelon "Maddy" Braun, in 2010. It rededicated its mission to education and promoting Jewish community, Yiddish culture and social justice activism. "The plan is to reboot by offering something [the Circle] feels religious Judaism has failed to provide: an education toward a cultural Jewish identity that uses religion as a trigger for activism and connects with a legacy of progressivism and commitment to universal values." The organization sold its former East side building and moved to new offices in the Garment District of New York City in 2011.

By 2010, the Circle had 10,000 members and 20 branches. It used proceeds from the sale of its building to begin to regrow its membership and community and school network, and to hire more educators. Toback said, "Our expression of Judaism is through activism, and we also believe that young people come to activism through being literate Jews. The two things go together." Continuing to teach children Yiddish is "a way of opening their minds and souls to something in our collective past that it is extremely important to connect to." In 2012, the Circle commissioned a study that showed that one in six American Jews "are actively seeking Jewish expression and engagement outside of synagogue life."

The Circle continues to sponsor holiday and community events, coordinate its branches around the country and partner with Jewish school programs. No longer a mutual aid society, it operates seven schools for children (kindershuls) and offers the largest adult Yiddish language instruction program in the world, which also collaborates with New Yiddish Rep. to teach the Yiddish language through theatre class. Its social justice activism includes opposing unfair labor practices, genocide and racism and supporting comprehensive immigration reform, single-payer universal health care, gun control, strong relations between the US and Israel, humanitarian relief, human rights, environmental conservation, women's equality, an increased minimum wage and separation of church and state.

On December 2, 2019, the organization unveiled its new name: the Workers Circle. This name embraces the tenor of the times in gender-neutral fashion and with a nod to the organization's century of activism at the fore of the labor movement, supporting worker rights to this day.

On September 28, 2023, the organization announced it was separating from Camp Kinder Ring and that both organizations will continue to operate independently.

== Publications ==
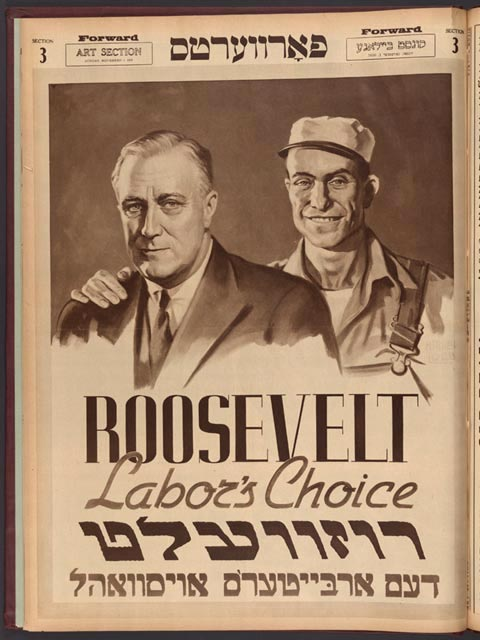
The Workers Circle published The Forward for many years (here expressing support for FDR's socialist "New Deal" in Yiddish and English).

As an organization organically linked to the historic Jewish labor movement, many of the Workmen's Circle's leaders were involved from its inception until the start of the 21st century with The Forward. Through much of the 20th century, the organization's newsletter was called The Workmen's Circle Call. From 2005 to 2009, The Workmen's Circle published Jewish Currents magazine and supplied it to the members of the Circle.

== Youth programs ==
The youth section of the Workmen's Circle in its early years was the Young Circle League of America (YCLA), established in 1930. The group self-identified as "first and foremost a cultural organization," sponsoring lectures, debates, and educational and recreational programs for its members. The YCLA also published its own magazine, The Call of Youth.

The Arbeter Ring runs seven kindershuls, or children's schools of Jewish culture, as after-school and Sunday school programs for elementary through middle schoolers. These are located in the Northeastern US and Chicago. Kindershuls emphasize the teaching of Jewish history, from Abraham onward. Jewish culture, including klezmer music and traditional Jewish cooking, is also emphasized, along with the Yiddish language and surrounding culture. Students learn to sing traditional songs in Yiddish, as well as in English and Hebrew. At the end of a student's time at kindershul, when he or she reaches age 12, a secular Bar/Bas Mitzvah ceremony, called a commencement, is held. Commencement students prepare a research paper, a family history paper, and a writeup on community service they have performed through the year. At the group commencement itself, students give a talk on their research topic of choice, often also telling their family history.

== See also ==
- United Jewish People's Order
- Arbeiter Ring Publishing, Winnipeg, Canada
- List of North American ethnic and religious fraternal orders
- International Workers Order (IWO)
