= Camp Boiberik =

Camp Boiberik was a Yiddish cultural summer camp founded by Leibush Lehrer in 1913. In 1923 the camp purchased property in Rhinebeck, New York, where it would remain until closing in 1979. It was the first Yiddish secular summer camp in America at the time.

Affiliated with the Sholem Aleichem Folk Institute, named after Sholem Aleichem, Boiberik was named after Sholem Aleichem's fictional village of Boiberik. Camp Boiberik is a secular, apolitical institution which emphasized Yiddishkeit or Yiddishkayt, or Eastern European Ashkenazi Jewish folk culture, including songs, dance, food in the tradition of the Borscht belt, theater, and humor. Although non-religious, Boiberik observed shabbos and kept a kosher kitchen.

Boiberik had interactions with and was somewhat similar to Camp Kinder Ring.

The name 'Boiberik' appears as a town in which the Tevye stories by Aleichem are set, as a fictionalization of the resort town Boiarka.

In 1982, the former campgrounds were purchased by the Omega Institute which currently resides there. Omega hosted a reunion of former campers in 1998.

== Bibliography ==
- Joselit, Jenna Weissman; Mittelman, Karen S. (1993). A Worthy Use of Summer: Jewish Summer Camping in America. National Museum of American Jewish History.
- Rosten, Leo; Bush, Lawrence (2001). The new Joys of Yiddish (Completely updated, 1. paperback ed.). New York: Three Rivers Press. ISBN 978-0-609-80692-0.
- Strom, Yale (2011) [2002]. The Book of Klezmer: The History, the Music, the Folklore. Chicago Review Press. ISBN 978-1-61374-063-7.
- Frazier, Michael (2012). Rhinebeck. Arcadia Publishing. ISBN 978-0-7385-9251-0.
- Mishler, Paul C. (1999). Raising reds: the young pioneers, radical summer camps, and Communist political culture in the United States. New York: Columbia Univ. Press. ISBN 978-0-231-11045-7.
- Krasner, Jonathan B. (2011). "Passionate Pioneers: The Story of Yiddish Secular Education in North America, 1910–1960 (review)". American Jewish History. 96 (3). Project Muse: 225–227. doi:10.1353/ajh.2011.0000. ISSN 1086-3141. S2CID 161869467.
- Drachler, Norman (December 1, 2017). A Bibliography of Jewish Education in the United States. Wayne State University Press. ISBN 978-0-8143-4349-4.
- Diner, Hasia R. (2009). We remember with reverence and love: American Jews and the myth of silence after the Holocaust, 1945 - 1962. New York, NY London: New York Univ. Press. ISBN 978-0-8147-2122-3.
- Kaye/Kantrowitz, Melanie; Klepfisz, Irena, eds. (1989). The Tribe of Dina =: [Shivṭah shel Dinah]: a Jewish women's anthology (Rev. and expanded ed.). Boston: Beacon Press. p. 37. ISBN 978-0-8070-3605-1.
- "The Secular Yiddish School and Summer Camp: A Hundred-Year History". Jewish Currents. Archived from the original on January 8, 2014.
