= Malka Heifetz Tussman =

Ukrainian-American Yiddish poet and teacher

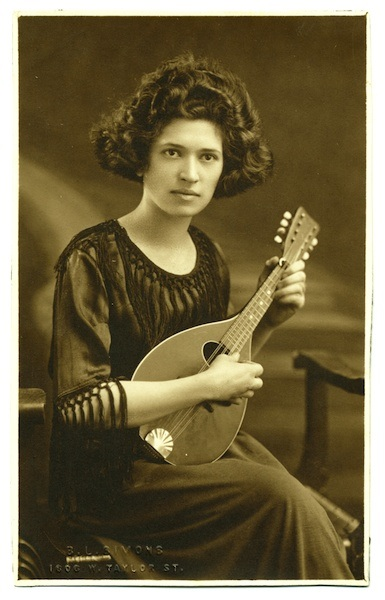
- Born: 1893 Bolshaya-Khaitcha, Volhynia
- Died: 1987 (aged 93–94) Berkeley, California
- Occupation: Poet, Teacher
- Language: Yiddish, English

Malka Heifetz Tussman (1893–1987) was a Ukrainian-American Yiddish poet and teacher.

== Life ==
Tussman was born in Volhynia in 1893, the second of eight children. As a young child, she was educated in Yiddish, Hebrew, Russian, and English. She immigrated to America in 1912, and moved to Chicago, where several family members already resided. At the age of 18, Tussman married Shloyme Tussman, a cantor, and had two sons in 1914 and 1918. Her son Joseph Tussman (4 December 1914 – 21 October 2005) became an eminent educator. She taught at a Yiddish school while studying at the University of Wisconsin. She also briefly studied at University of California, Berkeley.

Tussman moved to Los Angeles in 1941 or 1942 and taught at a Yiddish school at the Workmen's Circle School in Boyle Heights. She subsequently became a Yiddish language instructor at the University of Judaism. She lived in Israel for a year upon her husband's death in 1971, then returned to Berkeley where she lived until her death.

== Poetry ==
From 1918 and onwards, many of Tussman's works appeared in prominent Yiddish magazines. Publications such as Fraye Arbeter Shtime, Der Vokh, Oyfkum, Tint un Feder, and Di Goldene Keyt. Her work has also been presented in collections such as Antologye-Mitvest Mayrev and Amerike in Yidishn Vort. Tussman also published six volumes of poetry from 1949 to 1977, and a seventh was not completed and remains unpublished. Tussman's early poetry was in sonnet form, but she also experimented with triolets, and in her late works, she wrote in free verse.

Tussman also translated works into Yiddish and was known as the bridge between generations of Yiddish poets for her connection with younger poets and her work. Her work has been translated by her students, of which some were featured in With Teeth in the Earth (1992) by Marcia Falk.

Tussman won the Itzik Manger Prize for Yiddish literature in 1981.

== Selected works ==
- Bleter Faln Not (1972)
- Haynt Iz Eybik: Lider (1977)
- Lider (1949)
- Mild Mayn Vild (1958)
- Shotns fun Gedenkn (1965)
- Unter Dayn Tseykhn: Lider (1974)
