= Judaism =

Religion of the Jewish people

- יַהֲדוּת; Yahăḏūṯ
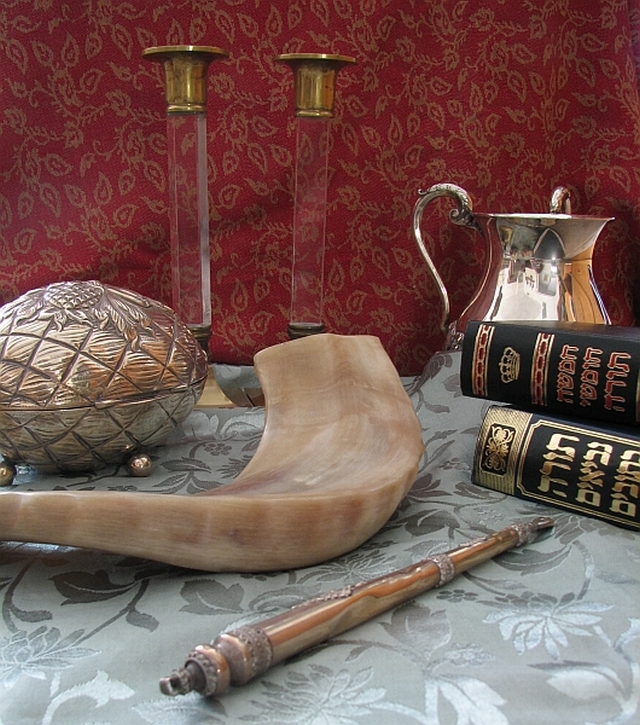
- Collection of Judaica (clockwise from top): Candlesticks for Shabbat, a cup for ritual handwashing, a Chumash and a Tanakh, a Yad, a shofar, and an etrog box.
- Type: Ethnic religion
- Classification: Abrahamic
- Scripture: Hebrew Bible; Traditions: Talmud; Exegesis: Midrash
- Theology: Monotheistic
- Region: Israel and worldwide as minorities
- Language: Biblical Hebrew and Biblical Aramaic
- Founder: Abraham and Moses (according to tradition)
- Origin: 1st millennium BCE; 20th–18th century BCE (traditional); Judah; Mesopotamia (traditional)
- Separated from: Yahwism
- Separations: Samaritanism; Mandaeism; Christianity
- Number of followers: c. 14.8 million ▲ (referred to as Jews, 2025)

Judaism (Note: /ˈd͡ʒuːˌdeɪ.ɪz.əm/, also /ˈd͡ʒuː.diˌɪz.əm/, /ˈd͡ʒuː.dəˌɪz.əm/ or /d͡ʒuˈdeɪˌɪz.əm/) (Hebrew: יַהֲדוּת, romanized: Yahăḏūṯ) is an Abrahamic, monotheistic, ethnic religion that comprises the collective spiritual, cultural, and legal traditions of the Jewish people. Religious Jews regard Judaism as their means of observing the Mosaic covenant, which they believe was established between God and the Jewish people. The religion is considered one of the earliest monotheistic religions.

Judaism as a religion and culture is founded upon a diverse body of texts, traditions, theologies, and worldviews. Among Judaism's core texts are the Torah (Biblical Hebrew: תּוֹרָה, lit. 'Teaching'), the Nevi'im (נְבִיאִים, 'Prophets'), and the Ketuvim (כְּתוּבִים, 'Writings'), which together compose the Hebrew Bible. In Modern Hebrew, the Hebrew Bible is often referred to as the Tanakh (תַּנַ׳׳ךּ, Tanaḵ)—an acronym of its constituent divisions—or the Miqra (מִקְרָא, Miqrāʾ, '[that which is] called out'); it is sometimes also called the "Written Torah" (תּוֹרָה שְׁבִּכְתָּב, Tōrā šəbīḵtāḇ, 'Torah that is in writing') due to it being a closed canon of written texts.

While the Hebrew word Torah specifically refers to the Five Books of Moses, it can also be used as a general term for the entire body of rabbinic literature and any teachings based on those texts. This "Oral Torah" (תּוֹרָה שֶׁבְּעַל־פֶּה, Tōrā šebbəʿal-pe, 'Torah by the mouth') includes both exegetical principles for textual interpretation and all rabbinic scholarship based on those principles. The Oral Torah comprises the Mishnah and the Talmud (collectively, the Gemara); the Tosefta; Midrashim (מִדְרָשִׁים, 'Studies' or 'Expositions'); Halakha (הֲלָכָה, 'the Way'), or Jewish law; Aggadah (אָגָּדָה, 'Narrative'); and all subsequent rabbinic commentary and responsa.

There are a variety of Jewish religious movements, most of which emerged from Rabbinic Judaism, which holds that God revealed his laws and commandments to Moses on Mount Sinai in both the Written Torah (תּוֹרָה שֶׁבִּכְתָב, Tōrā šebbīḵṯāv) and Oral Torah. Historically, all or part of this assertion was challenged by groups like the Sadducees and practitioners of Hellenistic Judaism during the Second Temple period; the Karaites; and among segments of the modern non-Orthodox denominations. Some modern branches of Judaism, such as Humanistic Judaism, may be considered secular or nontheistic. Today, the largest Jewish religious movements are Orthodox Judaism (including the Haredi and Modern Orthodox movements), Conservative Judaism, and Reform Judaism. Major sources of difference between these groups are their approaches to Halakha (Jewish law), rabbinic authority, and Rabbinic literature, and the significance of the State of Israel. Orthodox Judaism maintains that the Torah and Halakha are explicitly divine in origin, eternal, and unalterable, and that they should be strictly followed. Conservative and Reform Judaism are more liberal, with Conservative Judaism generally promoting a more traditionalist interpretation of Judaism's requirements than Reform Judaism. A typical Reform position is that Halakha should be viewed as a set of general guidelines rather than as a set of restrictions and obligations whose observance is required of all Jews. Historically, rabbinical courts known as batei din (בָּתֵּי דִּין, 'houses of judgement'; sing. beit din) enforced Halakha. Batei din are still existent, but the practice of Judaism is mostly voluntary. Authority on theological and legal matters is not vested in any one person or organization but in the Jewish texts and the rabbis and scholars who interpret them.

Judaism's texts, traditions, and values strongly influenced later religions and philosophies, including Christianity and Islam; collectively known as Abrahamic religions. By way of its relationship to Christianity, the dominant religion in the West, Judaism has had an indirect, yet significant role in the development of Western culture.

In 2025, the world Jewish population was estimated at 14.8 million, although religious observance varies from strict to non-existent.

== Etymology ==
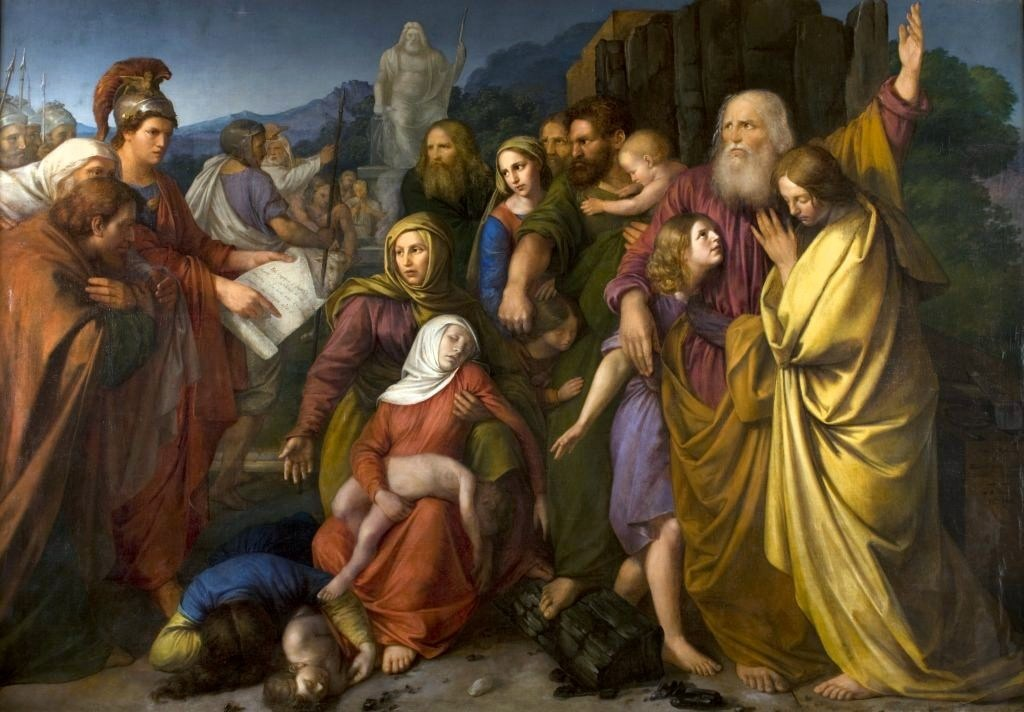
Maccabees by Wojciech Stattler (1842)

The term Judaism derives from Iudaismus, a Latinized form of the Ancient Greek Ioudaismos (Koine Greek: Ἰουδαϊσμός, from the verb ἰουδαΐζειν 'to side with or imitate the [Judeans]'). Its ultimate source is the biblical "Yehudah" (יהוּדָה, Yəhūda), the Hebrew name for Judah, son of Jacob, and the namesake of the tribe of Judah, the region of Judah, and the Kingdom of Judah. The term Ioudaismos first appears in the Koine Greek book of 2 Maccabees in the second century BCE (specifically 2 Maccabees 2:21, 8:1 and 14:38). In the context of the age and period, it meant "seeking or forming part of a cultural entity". It resembled its antonym Hellenismos, a word signifying submission to Hellenistic cultural norms. The conflict between Ioudaismos and Hellenismos lay behind the Maccabean Revolt; hence, the term Ioudaismos.

Rabbi Shaye J. D. Cohen writes in his book The Beginnings of Jewishness:

We are tempted, of course, to translate [Ioudaïsmós] as "Judaism," but this translation is too narrow, because in this first occurrence of the term, Ioudaïsmós has not yet been reduced to the designation of a religion. It means rather "the aggregate of all those characteristics that makes Judaeans Judaean (or Jews Jewish)." Among these characteristics, to be sure, are practices and beliefs that we would today call "religious," but these practices and beliefs are not the sole content of the term. Thus Ioudaïsmós should be translated not as "Judaism" but as Judaeanness.

Daniel R. Schwartz, however, argues that "Judaism", especially in the context of the books of the Maccabees, refers to the religion, not the culture and politics of the Judean state. He believes it reflected the ideological divide between the Pharisees and Sadducees and, implicitly, anti-Hasmonean and pro-Hasmonean factions in Judean society.

According to the Oxford English Dictionary, the earliest citation of the term in English was in Robert Fabyan's 1516 book The New Chronicles of England and France, in which "Judaism" is described as "the profession or practice of the Jewish religion; the religious system or polity of the Jews". "Judaism" as a direct translation of the Latin Iudaismus first appears in a Christian 1611 English translation of 2 Maccabees 2:21: "Those that behaved themselves manfully to their honour for Iudaisme."

== Biblical and Talmudic narrative ==
=== The covenant with Abraham in the book of Genesis ===
A large portion of the Hebrew Bible recounts the Hebrews' relationship with God from their earliest traditions through the Second Temple period (i.e., until roughly 70 CE, when the Temple was destroyed). Abraham, initially called Abram (אַבְרָם, Avram), is presented as the ancestor of the Israelites, the descendants of Jacob—whose name is changed to Israel (יִשְׂרָאֵל, Yīsrāʾēl) in Genesis 32:29—and thus the Hebrews. In the patriarchal age, God establishes a covenant with Abraham that includes the institution of circumcision (בְּרִית מִילָה, brit milah, 'covenant of circumcision') as a sign of that covenant, established when Abraham was 99 years old. The requirement to circumcise the males of his household is recorded in Genesis 17:10–14. God changes Abram's name to Abraham in Genesis 17:5 and Sarai's (שָׂרָי) name to Sarah (שָׂרָה). Sarah is promised to bear a son in her old age, and that son, Isaac (יִצְחָק, Yīṣḥāq), will be the child of the covenant and Abraham's heir, whose descendants will inherit the land often called Canaan.

=== The Torah, Nevi'im, and Ketuvim ===
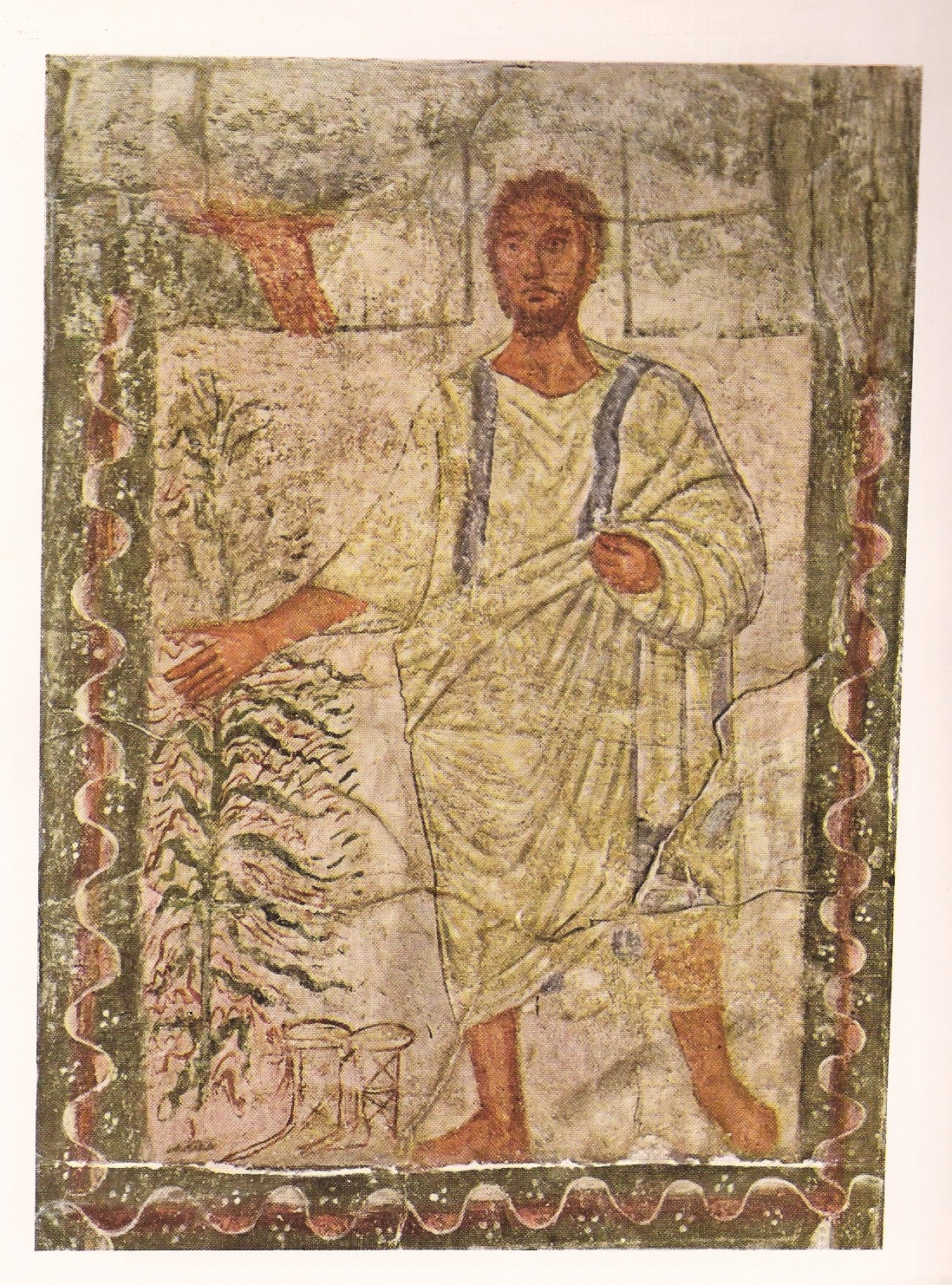
A painting of Moses decorates the Dura-Europos synagogue dating from 244 CE

In the book of Exodus, the second book of the Hebrew Bible, the descendants of Isaac's son Jacob were enslaved in Egypt during a period of harsh oppression. God, appearing to Moses in a divine vision through a burning bush on Mount Horeb, commands him to lead the Hebrews out of bondage. God inflicts ten plagues upon Egypt—such as the Nile turning to blood, swarms of locusts, and the death of the firstborn—to persuade Pharaoh to release the Hebrews. After the final plague, Pharaoh relents, and the Hebrews begin their escape, known as the Exodus. They travel across the desert and arrive at Mount Sinai, where God bestows the commandments, laws, and teachings that will define the moral and spiritual foundation of the Israelite community, as recounted in the subsequent chapters. These books, together with the Nevi'im and Ketuvim, are known as Written Torah, as opposed to the Oral Torah, which refers to the Mishnah, Talmud, and halakhic Midrashim (מִדְרָשִׁים, 'expositions'; sing. Midrash). The Nevi'im consist of historical narratives and prophetic writings, focusing on the Israelites' settlements in Canaan. The Ketuvim, a diverse collection of books including the book of Psalms, book of Proverbs, and book of Esther, covers poetic and prose philosophical writings that deviate from the more literalist style of the other books.

=== The Talmud ===
Rabbinic tradition holds that the details and interpretation of the Oral Torah were originally unwritten traditions based on the Law given to Moses at Sinai. However, as the persecution of Jews increased in intensity and frequency and the details of the Oral Torah were in danger of being forgotten, Judah ha-Nasi compiled them into the Mishnah, which was redacted c. 200 CE. The Talmud is a compilation of the Mishnah and Gemara, rabbinic commentaries redacted over the next three centuries. The Gemara originated in two major centers of Jewish scholarship: Palestine and Babylonia (Lower Mesopotamia). Correspondingly, two bodies of analysis developed, and two compilations of the Talmud were created. The older compilation is called the Jerusalem Talmud. It was compiled sometime during the 4th century in Palestine.

== History of Judaism ==
=== Iron Age kingdoms ===
Kingdoms of Israel and Judah map 900 BCE.

According to the Hebrew Bible, the United Kingdom of Israel was established under Saul the King and continued under King David and Solomon, with its capital being Jerusalem. After Solomon's reign, the nation split into two kingdoms, the Kingdom of Israel in the north and the Kingdom of Judah in the south. The Kingdom of Israel was destroyed around 720 BCE, when it was conquered by the Neo-Assyrian Empire; many people were taken captive from the capital Samaria to Media and the Khabur River valley. The Kingdom of Judah continued as an independent state until it was conquered by Nebuchadnezzar II of the Neo-Babylonian Empire in 586–87 BCE.

=== Babylonian captivity, return, and Second Temple ===
The Babylonians destroyed Jerusalem and the First Temple, forcing the Israelites into the Babylonian captivity in what is regarded as the first Jewish diaspora. Many of the Israelites returned to their homeland—an event known as the return to Zion—after the fall of Babylon was accomplished by the Persian Achaemenid Empire seventy years later. The Second Temple was constructed, and religious practices were resumed.

During the early years of the Second Temple, the highest religious authority was the Great Assembly, led by Ezra. Among other accomplishments of the Great Assembly, the last books of the Hebrew Bible were, in traditional interpretations, written at this time and the canon was sealed. Hellenistic Judaism spread to Ptolemaic Egypt from the 3rd century BCE, and its creation sparked widespread controversy in Jewish communities, starting "conflicts within Jewish communities about accommodating the cultures of occupying powers." Later, during the First Jewish–Roman War (66–73 CE), the Romans sacked Jerusalem and destroyed the Second Temple.

=== Post-Temple Judaism ===
Later, Roman emperor Hadrian built a pagan idol on the Temple Mount and prohibited circumcision. These acts of ethnocide provoked the Bar Kokhba revolt (132–136 CE), after which the Romans banned Torah study and the celebration of Jewish holidays and forcibly removed virtually all Jews from Judea. In 200 CE, however, Jews were granted Roman citizenship and Judaism was recognized as a religio licita (lit. 'licit religion' or 'legitimate religion') until the rise of Gnosticism and early Christianity in the fourth century.

Following the destruction of Jerusalem and the expulsion of the Jews, Jewish worship stopped being centrally organized around the Temple; prayer took the place of sacrifice; worship was conducted within the Jewish communities of the diaspora; and the authority of Chazal (pronounced [χaˈzal]; חֲזַ״ל, a Hebrew acronym for חֲכָמֵינוּ זִכְרוֹנָם לִבְרָכָה, Ḥakhaméinu zikhronam livrakhah, 'our Sages, of blessed memory') and rabbis who acted as teachers and leaders of individual communities was established.

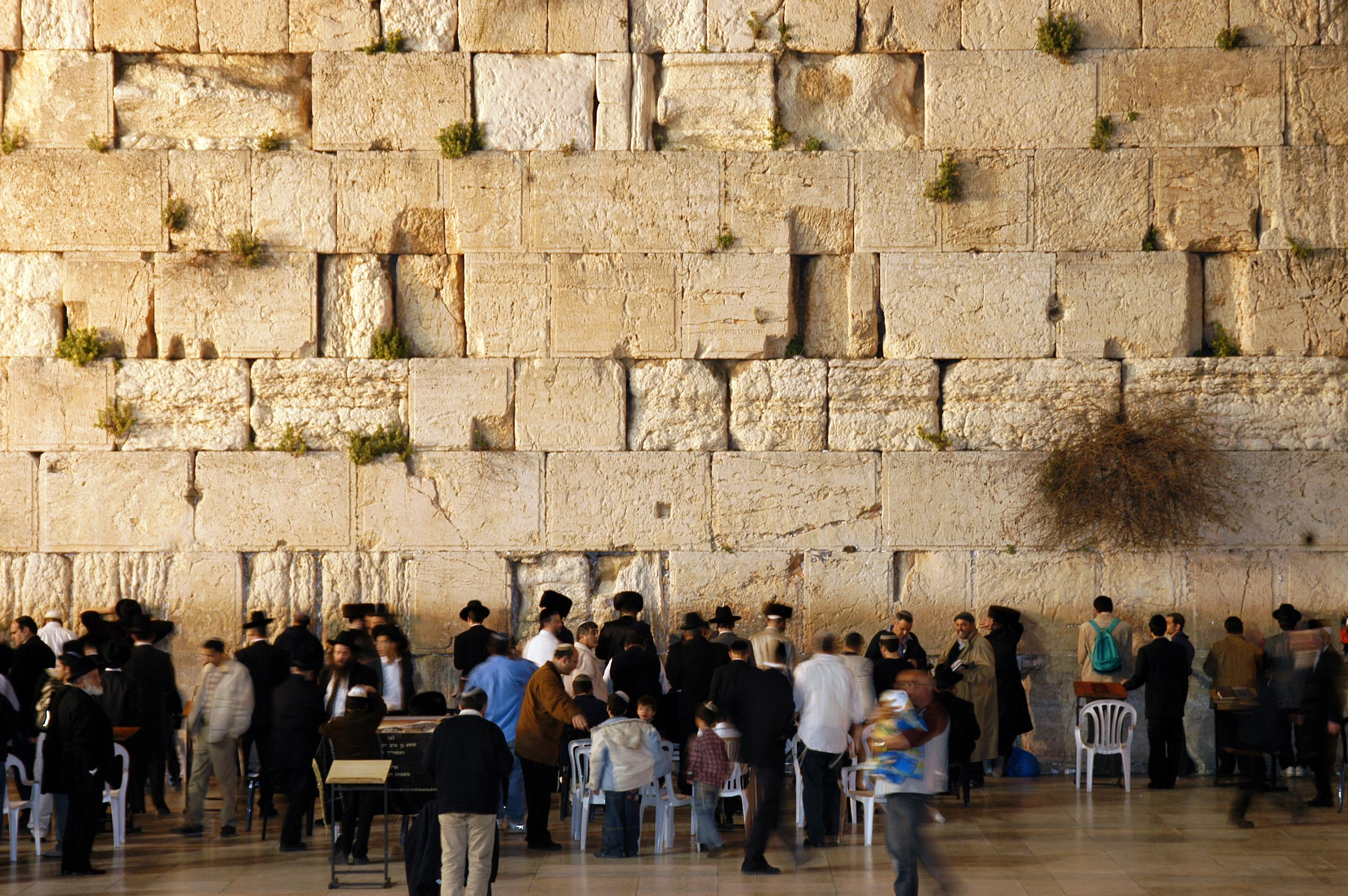
The Western Wall in Jerusalem is a remnant of the wall encircling the Second Temple. The Temple Mount is the holiest site in Judaism.

==== Judaism in pre-Islamic Arabia ====
Judaism in pre-Islamic Arabia goes back to the pre-Christian period, and was concentrated in the northwest and south. In the fourth century, the ruling class of the Himyarite Kingdom of pre-Islamic South Arabia converted to Judaism. This situation lasted until the early sixth century, when the Aksumite invasion of Himyar, instigated by the massacre of Najran, led to a transition to Christian domination.

== Defining characteristics and principles of faith ==
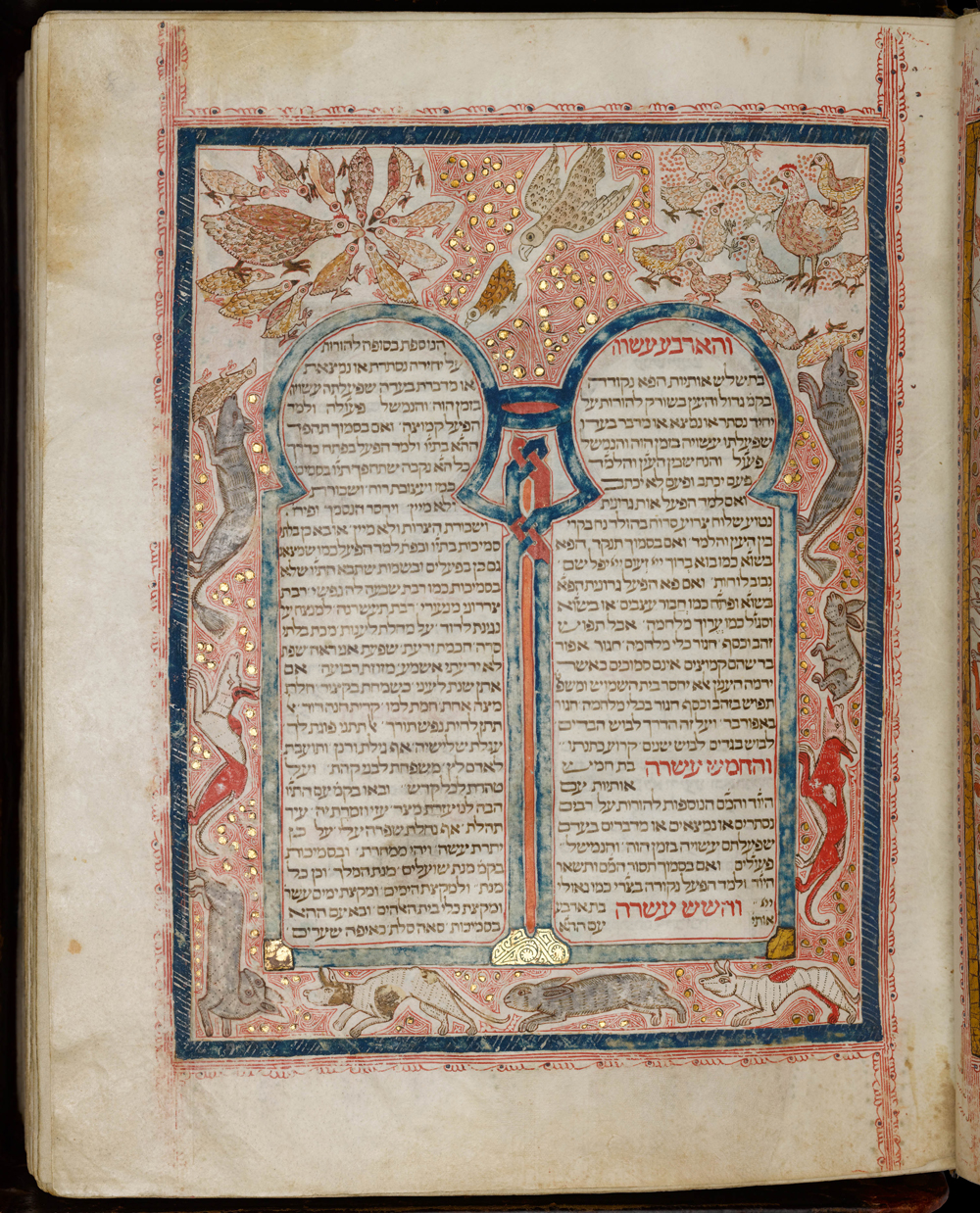
Kennicott Bible, a 1476 Spanish Tanakh

Unlike other ancient Near Eastern gods, the Jewish God is portrayed as unitary and solitary; consequently, the Jewish God's principal relationships are not with other gods, but with the world, and more specifically, with the people he created. Judaism thus begins with ethical monotheism: the belief that God is one (הַשֵּׁם אֶחָד, haššēm ʾeḥād, 'HaShem [is] one'), reflected by religious Jews' twice-daily recitation of Shema Yisrael (שְׁמַע יִשְׂרָאֵל ה׳ אֱלֹקֵינוּ ה׳ אֶחָד, šəmaʿ yiśrāʾēl YHWH ʾĕlōhê-nû YHWH ʾeḥād, 'Listen, Yisra'el: HaShem [is] our God; HaShem [is] one'), and concerned with the actions of humankind. According to the Hebrew Bible, God promised Abraham that he would make of his offspring a great nation. Many generations later, he commanded the Israelites to love and worship only one God; that is, the Jewish nation is to reciprocate God's concern for the world. He also commanded the Jewish people to love one another; that is, Jews are to imitate God's love for people.

Thus, although there is an esoteric tradition in Judaism in Kabbalah, Conservative rabbi and scholar Max Kadushin has characterized normative Judaism as "normal mysticism", because it involves everyday personal experiences of God through ways or modes that are common to all Jews. This is played out through the observance of Halakha and given verbal expression in the Birkhot Ha-Mitzvot (בִּרְכוֹת הַמּצְווֹת, 'Blessings [of] the Mitzvot'), the short blessings recited every time a positive commandment is to be fulfilled:

The ordinary, familiar, everyday things and occurrences we have, constitute occasions for the experience of God. Such things as one's daily sustenance, the very day itself, are felt as manifestations of God's loving-kindness, calling for the Berakhot. Kedushah, holiness, which is nothing else than the imitation of God, is concerned with daily conduct, with being gracious and merciful, with keeping oneself from defilement by idolatry, adultery, and the shedding of blood. The Birkat Ha-Mitzwot evokes the consciousness of holiness at a rabbinic rite, but the objects employed in the majority of these rites are non-holy and of general character, while the several holy objects are non-theurgic. And not only do ordinary things and occurrences bring with them the experience of God. Everything that happens to a man evokes that experience, evil as well as good, for a Berakhah is said also at evil tidings. Hence, although the experience of God is like none other, the occasions for experiencing Him, for having a consciousness of Him, are manifold, even if we consider only those that call for Berakot.

Whereas Jewish philosophers often debate whether God is immanent or transcendent, and whether people have free will or their lives are determined, Halakha is a system through which Jews act to recognize God in the world. Ethical monotheism is central in all sacred or normative texts of Judaism. However, monotheism has not always been followed in practice. The Hebrew Bible records and repeatedly condemns the widespread worship of other gods in ancient Israel. In the Greco-Roman era, many different interpretations of monotheism existed in Judaism, including the interpretations that gave rise to Christianity.

Moreover, some have argued that Judaism is a non-creedal religion that does not require one to believe in God. For some, observance of Halakha is more important than belief in God per se. The debate about whether one can speak of authentic or normative Judaism is not only a debate among religious Jews but also among historians.

=== Core tenets ===
The 13 principles of faith of Maimonides, summarized:

1. There is a God
2. There is one God
3. God has no physical body
4. God is eternal
5. Only God may be worshipped
6. Prophecy: God communicates with humans
7. Moses was the greatest of the prophets
8. Torah comes from God
9. The Torah is the authentic word of God and may not be changed
10. God is aware of all our deeds
11. God rewards the righteous and punishes the wicked
12. The Messiah will come
13. The dead will be resurrected

Judaism does not possess fixed, universally binding articles of faith, in the same sense as those instituted by Christianity and Islam, though some are incorporated into the liturgy to a certain extent. Scholars throughout Jewish history have proposed numerous formulations of Judaism's core tenets, all of which have met with criticism. In the 12th century, Maimonides developed his 13 principles of faith, which is the most widely accepted formulation. According to Maimonides, any Jew who rejects even one of these principles would be considered an apostate and a heretic. Jewish scholars have held points of view diverging in various ways from his principles. Thus, within Reform Judaism, only the first five principles are endorsed.

In the time of Maimonides, his list of tenets was criticized by Hasdai Crescas and Joseph Albo. Albo and Abraham ben David argued that his principles contained too many items that, while true, were not fundamentals of the faith. Along these lines, the ancient Jewish historian Josephus emphasized practice and observances rather than theology, associating apostasy with a failure to observe Halakha and maintaining that the requirements for conversion to Judaism included circumcision and adherence to traditional customs. The 13 principles were largely ignored over the next few centuries. Later, two poetic restatements of these principles, Ani Ma'amin (אֲנִי מַאֲמִין, ʾănî maʾămîn, 'I believe') and Yigdal (יִגְדַּל, 'may [God] be magnified'), became integrated into many Jewish liturgies, leading to their eventual near-universal acceptance.

The oldest instance of the Karaite movement's formulation of articles of faith is found in the work of the 12th-century figure Judah Hadassi:

1. God is the Creator of all created beings;
2. He is premundane and has no peer or associate;
3. The whole universe is created;
4. God called Moses and the other Prophets of the Biblical canon;
5. The Law of Moses alone is true;
6. To know the language of the Bible is a religious duty;
7. The Temple at Jerusalem is the palace of the world's Ruler;
8. Belief in Resurrection contemporaneous with the advent of the Messiah;
9. Final judgment;
10. Retribution.

— Judah ben Elijah Hadassi, Eshkol ha-Kofer

In modern times, Judaism lacks a centralized authority that dictates orthodoxies. Because of this, many variations on basic beliefs are considered within the scope of Judaism. Even so, all Jewish religious movements are, to a greater or lesser extent, based on the principles of the Hebrew Bible and various commentaries, including the Talmud and Midrash. Judaism also universally recognizes the biblical covenant between God and the patriarch Abraham, as well as the additional aspects of the covenant revealed to Moses, who is considered Judaism's greatest prophet. In the Mishnah, a core text of Rabbinic Judaism, acceptance of the divine origins of this covenant is considered an essential aspect of Judaism, and those who reject the covenant forfeit their share in the world to come.

Establishing the core tenets of Judaism in the modern era is even more challenging, given the numerous and diverse contemporary Jewish religious movements. Even if restricting the problem to the most influential intellectual trends of the nineteenth and twentieth centuries, the matter remains complicated. Thus, for instance, Rav Joseph B. Soloveitchik's (associated with Modern Orthodox Judaism) answer to modernity is constituted upon the identification of Judaism with following the Halakha, whereas its ultimate goal is to bring holiness down to the world. Rabbi Mordecai Kaplan, the originator of Reconstructionist Judaism, abandons the idea of religion for the sake of identifying Judaism as a civilization, and by means of the latter term and secular translation of the core ideas, he tries to embrace as many Jewish movements as possible. In turn, Solomon Schechter's Conservative Judaism was identical with the tradition understood as the interpretation of Torah, in itself being the history of the creative interpretation and reinterpretation of the Hebrew Bible and Halakha. Finally, David Philipson draws the outlines of the Reform movement by opposing it to the strict and traditional rabbinical approach and thus comes to conclusions somewhat similar to that of the Conservative movement.

== Religious texts ==
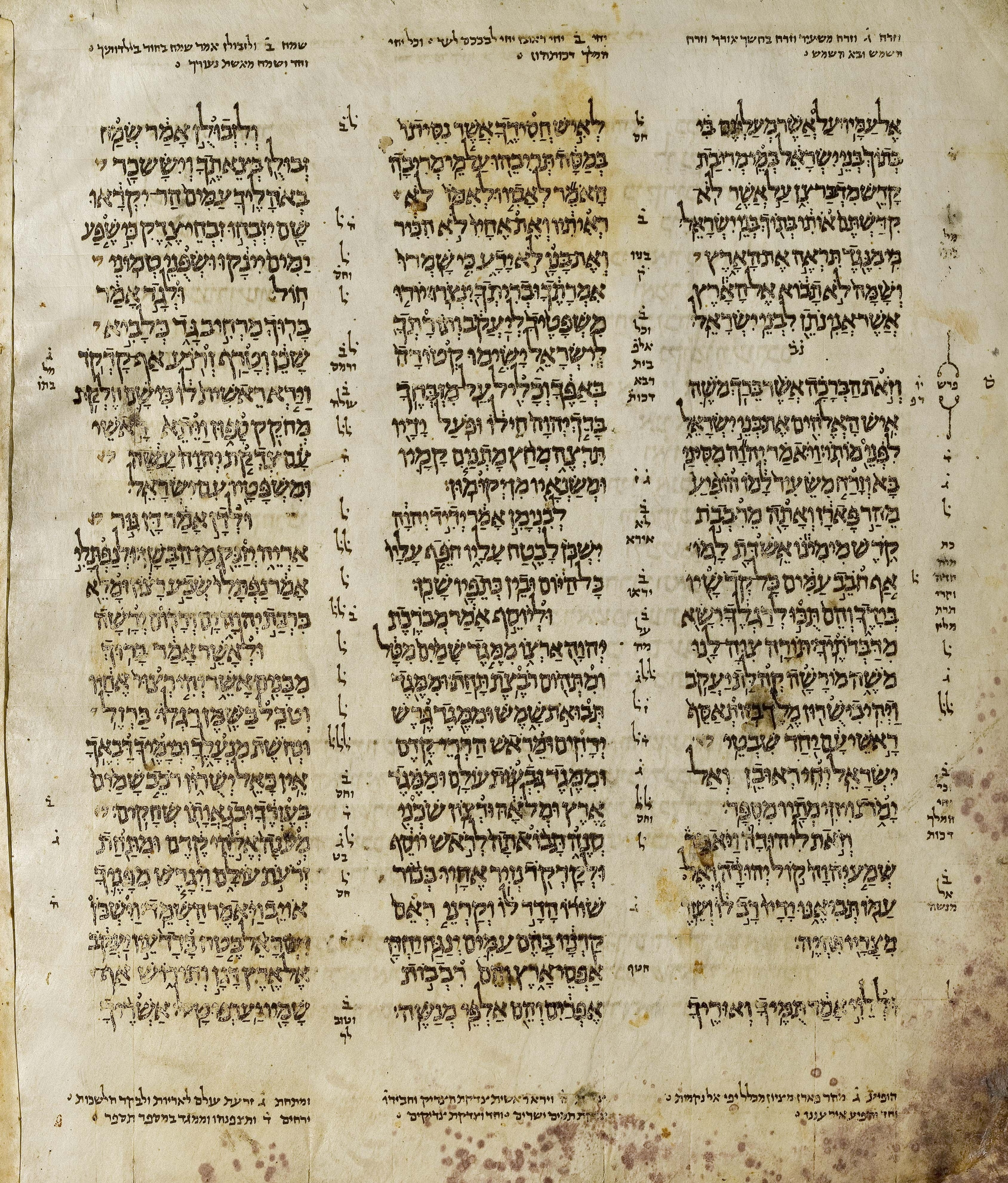
Aleppo Codex, a Tanakh produced in Tiberias in the 10th century

The following is a basic, structured list of the central works of Jewish practice and thought:

- The Tanakh (תַּנַ״ךְ, tanaḵ), its translations, and its primary exegeses:
  - The Tanakh itself:
    - The Torah (תּוֹרָה, Tôrâ, lit. 'Instruction' or 'Teaching')
    - The Nevi'im (נְבִיאִים, Nĕbîʾîm, 'Prophets')
    - The Ketuvim (כְּתוּבִים, Kĕtûvîm, 'Writings')
  - The Masorah (מָסוֹרָה, 'tradition')
  - Targumim (תַּרְגּוּמִים, 'translations')
  - Jewish biblical exegesis (also see Midrash below)
- Primarily legal works of the Talmudic era (i.e., classical rabbinic literature)
  - The Mishnah (מִשְׁנָה) and its commentaries
  - The Tosefta (תוֹסֶפְתָּא, 'supplement') and the minor tractates
  - The Talmuds:
    - The Babylonian Talmud (תַּלְמוּד בַּבְלִי, Talmûd Bāblî) and its commentaries
    - The Jerusalem Talmud (תַּלְמוּד יְרוּשַׁלְמִי, Talmûd Yerûšalmî; also known as תַּלְמוּד אֶרֶץ יִשְׂרָאֵל, Talmûd ʾEreṣ Yiśrāʾēl, 'Talmud [of the] Land [of] Israel') and its commentaries
- Midrash (מִדְרָשׁ, 'textual interpretation'):
  - Midrash Halakha (מִדְרַשׁ הֲלָכָה)
  - Midrash Aggadah (מִדְרַשׁ אַגָּדָה)
- Halakha (הֲלָכָה, Halākhāh, 'Jewish law'):
  - Codes of Jewish law and custom, such as:
    - Maimonides's Mishneh Torah (מִשְׁנֵה תּוֹרָה, Mišnê Tôrâ, 'Repetition [of the] Torah') and its commentaries
    - Rabbi Jacob ben Asher's Arba'ah Turim (אַרְבָּעָה טוּרִים, ʾArbāʿāh Ṭurîm, 'Four Rows'), (Note: Often referred to as the Tur (טוּר, Ṭûr, 'Row')) as well as its commentaries
    - Rabbi Joseph Karo's Shulchan Aruch (שֻׁלְחָן עָרוּךְ, Šulḥān ʿĀrûḵ, 'Set Table') and its commentaries
  - The responsa literature
- Other components of Jewish thought:
  - Works of Jewish philosophy, such as those of Jewish existentialism and Holocaust theology
  - Musar (מוּסָר, Mûsār, 'ethics') and other works on Jewish ethics and conduct
  - Kabbalah (קַבָּלָה, Qabbālāh, 'Reception')and other streams of Jewish mysticism
  - Works of Hasidic philosophy (חֲסִידוּת, Ḥasidût, lit. 'piety' or 'devoutness'), the foundation of Hasidic Judaism
- Jewish prayer books, which vary across Jewish religious movements:
  - Siddurim (סִדּוּרִים; sing., סִדּוּר, siddûr, 'order [of prayers]'), which are used throughout most of the Jewish religious calendar
  - Machzorim (מַחְזוֹרִים, Maḥzôrîm; sing., מַחְזוֹר, maḥzôr, lit. 'cycle' or 'recurrence'), which are used only during the High Holy Days
- Other works on the Jewish liturgy, including piyyutim (פִּיּוּטִים, piyyûṭîm, 'liturgical poems'; sing., פִּיּוּט, piyyûṭ)

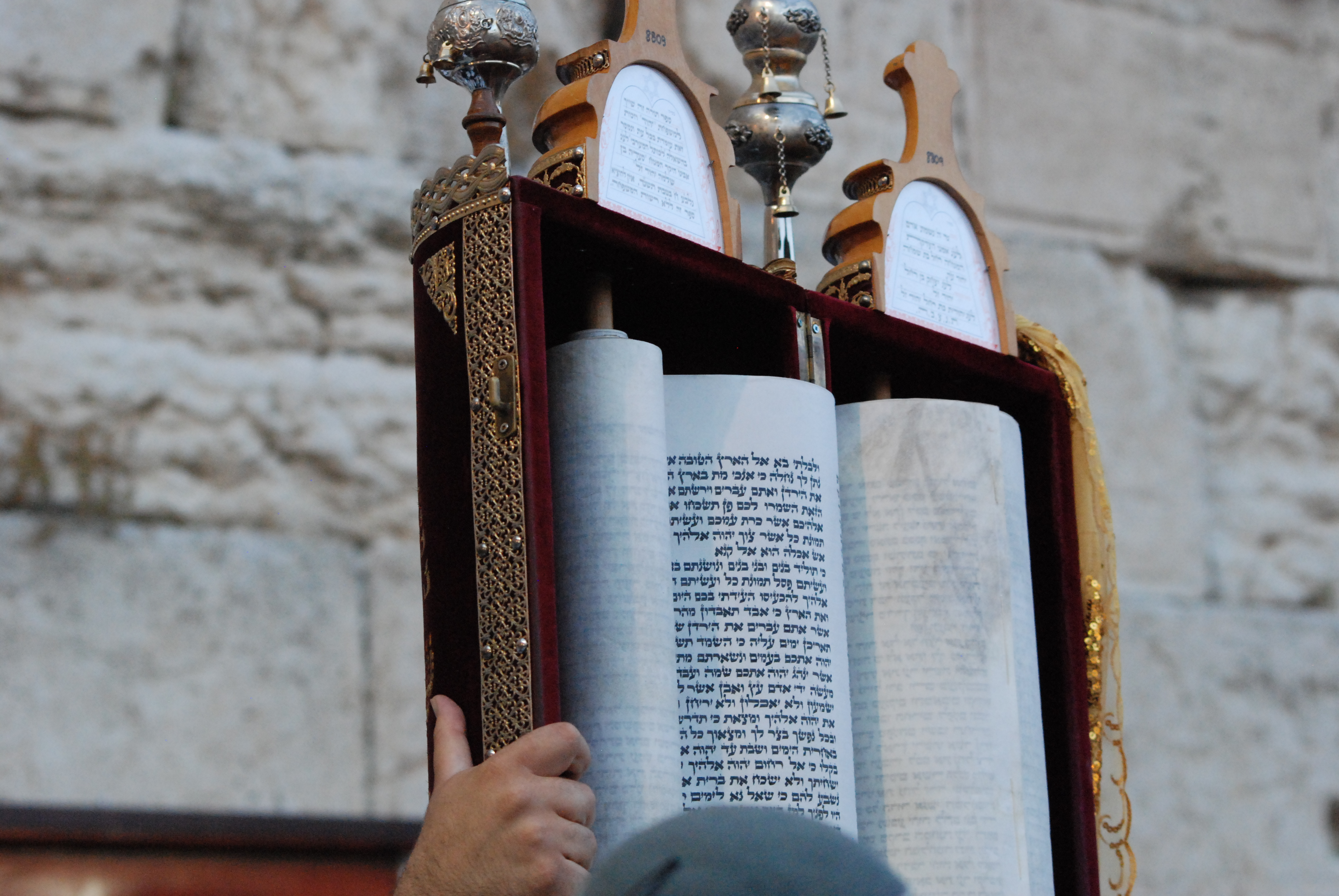
A man holds up a Sephardi-style torah at the Western Wall, Jerusalem

=== Legal literature ===
The basis of halakha and tradition is the Torah (also known as the Pentateuch or the Five Books of Moses). According to rabbinic tradition, there are 613 commandments in the Torah. Some of these laws are directed only to men or to women, some only to the ancient priestly groups, the Kohanim and Leviyim (members of the tribe of Levi), some only to farmers within the Land of Israel. Many laws were only applicable when the Temple in Jerusalem existed, and only 369 of these commandments are still applicable today.

While there have been Jewish groups whose beliefs and practices were based on the written text of the Torah alone (e.g., the Sadducees, and the Karaites), most Jews follow the oral law. These oral traditions were transmitted by the Pharisee school of thought in ancient Judaism and later recorded in writing and expanded upon by the rabbis.

According to Rabbinical Jewish tradition, God gave both the Written Law (the Torah) and the Oral Torah to Moses on Mount Sinai. The Oral law is the oral tradition as relayed by God to Moses and from him, transmitted and taught to the sages (rabbinic leaders) of each subsequent generation.

For centuries, the Torah existed only as a written text transmitted alongside the oral tradition. Fearing that the oral teachings might be forgotten, Rabbi Judah haNasi undertook the mission of consolidating the various opinions into one body of law which became known as the Mishnah.

The Mishnah consists of 63 tractates that codify halakha, the basis of the Talmud. According to Abraham ben David, the Mishnah was compiled by Rabbi Judah haNasi after the destruction of Jerusalem, in anno mundi 3949, which corresponds to 189 CE.

Over the next four centuries, the Mishnah was discussed and debated in both the world's major Jewish communities (in Israel and Babylonia). The commentaries from each of these communities were eventually compiled into the two Talmuds, the Jerusalem Talmud (Talmud Yerushalmi) and the Babylonian Talmud (Talmud Bavli). These have been further expounded upon by the commentaries of various Torah scholars throughout the ages.

In the text of the Torah, many words are left undefined, and many procedures are mentioned without explanation or instructions. Such phenomena are sometimes offered to support the view that the Written Law has always been transmitted alongside a parallel oral tradition, thereby suggesting that the reader is already familiar with the details from other, i.e., oral, sources.

Halakha, the rabbinic Jewish way of life, is then based on a combined reading of the Torah and the oral tradition—the Mishnah, the halakhic Midrash, the Talmud, and its commentaries. The halakha has developed slowly, through a precedent-based system. The literature of questions to rabbis, and their considered answers, is referred to as responsa (Hebrew Sheelot U-Teshuvot). Over time, as practices develop, codes of halakha are written that are based on the responsa; the most important code, the Shulchan Aruch, largely determines Orthodox religious practice today.

=== Jewish philosophy ===
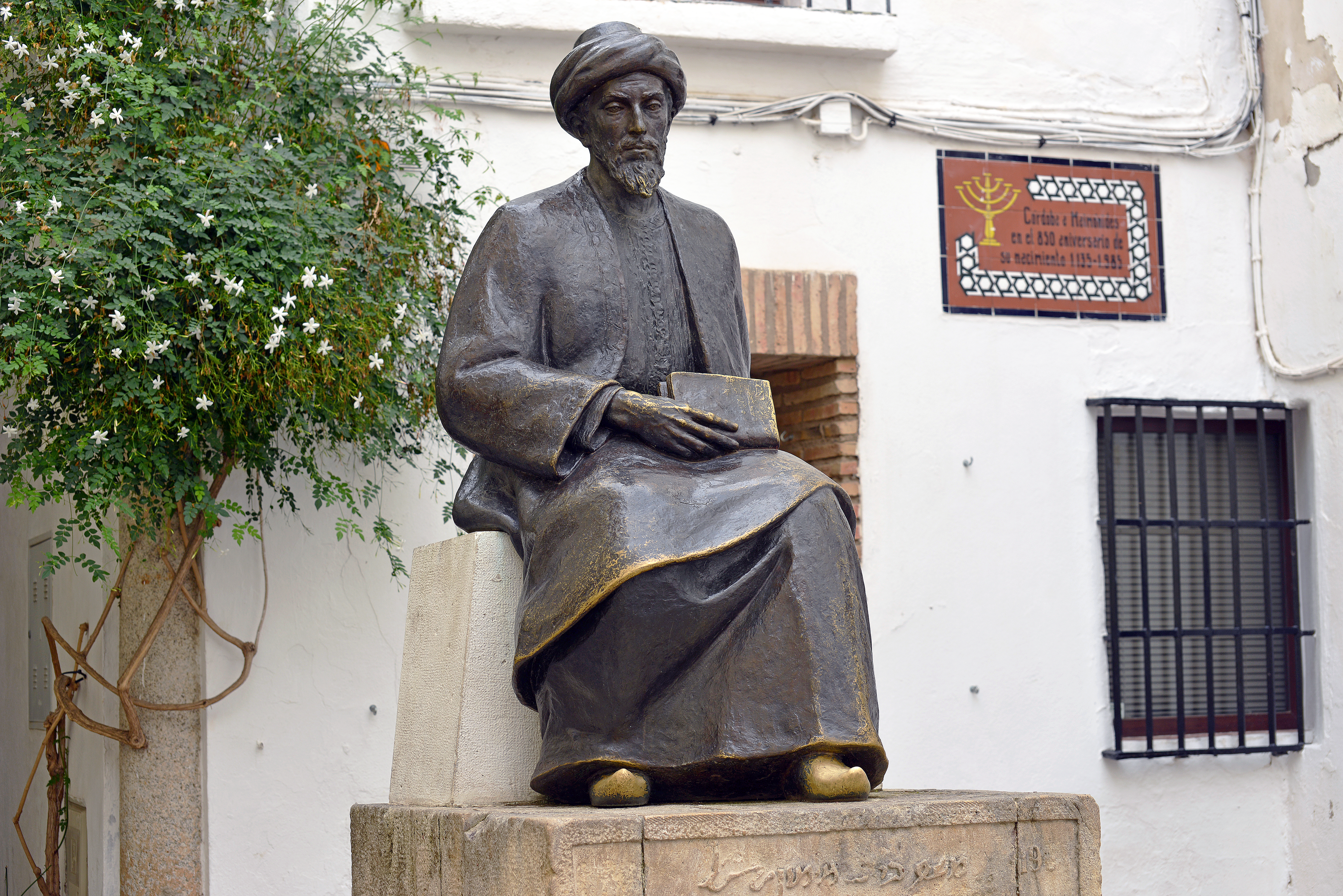
Statue of Maimonides in Córdoba, Spain

Jewish philosophy refers to the conjunction between serious study of philosophy and Jewish theology. Major Jewish philosophers include Philo of Alexandria, Solomon ibn Gabirol, Saadia Gaon, Judah Halevi, Maimonides, and Gersonides. Major changes occurred in response to the Enlightenment (late 18th to early 19th century), leading to the emergence of post-Enlightenment Jewish philosophers. Modern Jewish philosophy encompasses both Orthodox and non-Orthodox perspectives. Notable among Orthodox Jewish philosophers are Eliyahu Eliezer Dessler, Joseph B. Soloveitchik, and Yitzchok Hutner. Well-known non-Orthodox Jewish philosophers include Martin Buber, Franz Rosenzweig, Mordecai Kaplan, Abraham Joshua Heschel, Will Herberg, and Emmanuel Lévinas.

=== Rabbinic hermeneutics ===
13 Principles of Hermeneutics:

1. A law that operates under certain conditions will surely be operative in other situations where the same conditions are present in a more acute form
2. A law operating in one situation will also be operative in another situation if the text characterizes both situations in identical terms.
3. A law that clearly expresses the purpose it was meant to serve will also apply to other situations where the identical purpose may be served.
4. When illustrative particulars follow a general rule, only those particulars are to be embraced by it.
5. A law that begins with specifying particular cases, and then proceeds to an all-embracing generalization, is to be applied to particulars cases not specified but logically falling into the same generalization.
6. A law that begins with a generalization as to its intended applications, then continues with the specification of particular cases, and then concludes with a restatement of the generalization, can be applied only to the particular cases specified.
7. The rules about a generalization being followed or preceded by specifying particulars (rules 4 and 5) will not apply if it is apparent that the specification of the particular cases or the statement of the generalization is meant purely for achieving a greater clarity of language.
8. A particular case already covered in a generalization that is nevertheless treated separately suggests that the same particularized treatment be applied to all other cases that are covered in that generalization.
9. A penalty specified for a general category of wrongdoing is not to be automatically applied to a particular case that is withdrawn from the general rule to be specifically prohibited, but without any mention of the penalty.
10. A general prohibition followed by a specified penalty may be followed by a particular case, normally included in the generalization, with a modification in the penalty, either toward easing it or making it more severe.
11. A case logically falling into a general law but treated separately remains outside the provisions of the general law except in those instances where it is specifically included in them.
12. Obscurities in Biblical texts may be cleared up from the immediate context or from subsequently occurring passages
13. Contradictions in Biblical passages may be removed through the mediation of other passages.

— R. Ishmael

Orthodox and many other Jews do not believe that the revealed Torah consists solely of its written contents, but of its interpretations as well. The study of Torah (in its widest sense, including both poetry, narrative, and law, and both the Hebrew Bible and the Talmud) is, in Judaism, itself a sacred act of central importance. For the sages of the Mishnah and Talmud, and for their successors today, the study of Torah was therefore not merely a means to learn the contents of God's revelation, but an end in itself. According to the Talmud:

These are the things for which a person enjoys the dividends in this world while the principal remains for the person to enjoy in the world to come; they are: honoring parents, loving deeds of kindness, and making peace between one person and another. But the study of the Torah is equal to them all. (Talmud Shabbat 127a).

In Judaism, "the study of Torah can be a means of experiencing God". Reflecting on the contribution of the Amoraim and Tanaim to contemporary Judaism, Professor Jacob Neusner observed:

The rabbi's logical and rational inquiry is not mere logic-chopping. It is a most serious and substantive effort to locate in trivialities the fundamental principles of the revealed will of God to guide and sanctify the most specific and concrete actions in the workaday world. ... Here is the mystery of Talmudic Judaism: the alien and remote conviction that the intellect is an instrument not of unbelief and desacralization but of sanctification.

To study the Written Torah and the Oral Torah in light of each other is thus also to study how to study the word of God.

In the study of Torah, the sages formulated and followed various logical and hermeneutical principles. According to David Stern, all Rabbinic hermeneutics rest on two basic axioms:

first, the belief in the omni-significance of Scripture, in the meaningfulness of its every word, letter, even (according to one famous report) scribal flourish; second, the claim of the essential unity of Scripture as the expression of the single divine will.

These two principles make possible a great variety of interpretations. According to the Talmud:

A single verse has several meanings, but no two verses hold the same meaning. It was taught in the school of R. Ishmael: 'Behold, My word is like fire—declares the Lord—and like a hammer that shatters rock' (Jer 23:29). Just as this hammer produces many sparks (when it strikes the rock), so a single verse has several meanings." (Talmud Sanhedrin 34a).

Observant Jews thus view the Torah as dynamic, because it contains within it a host of interpretations.

According to Rabbinic tradition, all valid interpretations of the written Torah were revealed to Moses at Sinai in oral form and handed down from teacher to pupil (the oral revelation is, in effect, coextensive with the Talmud itself). When different rabbis forwarded conflicting interpretations, they sometimes appealed to hermeneutic principles to legitimize their arguments; some rabbis claim that these principles were themselves revealed by God to Moses at Sinai.

Thus, Hillel called attention to seven commonly used hermeneutical principles in the interpretation of laws (baraita at the beginning of Sifra); R. Ishmael, thirteen (baraita at the beginning of Sifra; this collection is largely an amplification of that of Hillel). Eliezer b. Jose ha-Gelili listed 32, largely used for the exegesis of narrative elements of Torah. All the hermeneutic rules scattered through the Talmudim and Midrashim have been collected by Malbim in Ayyelet ha-Shachar, the introduction to his commentary on the Sifra. Nevertheless, R. Ishmael's 13 principles are perhaps the ones most widely known; they constitute an important, and one of Judaism's earliest, contributions to logic, hermeneutics, and jurisprudence. Judah Hadassi incorporated Ishmael's principles into Karaite Judaism in the 12th century. Today, R. Ishmael's 13 principles are incorporated into the Jewish prayer book to be read by observant Jews daily.

== Jewish identity ==
=== Distinction between Jews as a people and Judaism ===
According to Daniel Boyarin, the underlying distinction between religion and ethnicity is foreign to Judaism itself, and is one form of the dualism between spirit and flesh that has its origin in Platonic philosophy and that permeated Hellenistic Judaism. Consequently, in his view, Judaism does not fit easily into conventional Western categories, such as religion, ethnicity, or culture. Boyarin suggests that this in part reflects the fact that much of Judaism's more than 3,000-year history predates the rise of Western culture and occurred outside the West (that is, Europe, particularly medieval and modern Europe). During this time, Jews experienced slavery, anarchic and theocratic self-government, conquest, occupation, and exile. In the Jewish diaspora, they were in contact with, and influenced by, ancient Egyptian, Babylonian, Persian, and Hellenic cultures, as well as modern movements such as the Enlightenment (see Haskalah) and the rise of nationalism, which would bear fruit in the form of a Jewish state in their ancient homeland, the Land of Israel. Thus, Boyarin has argued that "Jewishness disrupts the very categories of identity, because it is not national, not genealogical, not religious, but all of these, in dialectical tension."

In contrast to this point of view, practices such as Humanistic Judaism reject the religious aspects of Judaism, while retaining certain cultural traditions.

=== Who is a Jew? ===
According to Rabbinic Judaism, a Jew is anyone who was either born of a Jewish mother or who converted to Judaism in accordance with halakha. Reconstructionist Judaism and the larger denominations of worldwide Progressive Judaism (also known as Liberal or Reform Judaism) accept the child as Jewish if one of the parents is Jewish, if the parents raise the child with a Jewish identity, but not the smaller regional branches. All mainstream forms of Judaism today are open to sincere converts, although conversion has traditionally been discouraged since the time of the Talmud. The conversion process is evaluated by an authority, and the convert is examined on his or her sincerity and knowledge. Converts are called "ben Abraham" or "bat Abraham", (son or daughter of Abraham). Conversions have on occasion been overturned. In 2008, Israel's highest religious court invalidated the conversion of 40,000 Jews, mostly from Russian immigrant families, even though they had been approved by an Orthodox rabbi.

Rabbinical Judaism maintains that a Jew, whether by birth or conversion, is a Jew forever. Thus a Jew who claims to be an atheist or converts to another religion is still considered by traditional Judaism to be Jewish. According to some sources, the Reform movement has maintained that a Jew who has converted to another religion is no longer a Jew, and the Israeli Government has also taken that stance after Supreme Court cases and statutes. However, the Reform movement has indicated that this is not so cut and dried, and different situations call for consideration and differing actions. For example, Jews who have converted under duress may be permitted to return to Judaism "without any action on their part but their desire to rejoin the Jewish community" and "A proselyte who has become an apostate remains, nevertheless, a Jew".

Karaite Judaism believes that Jewish identity can only be transmitted by patrilineal descent. Although a minority of modern Karaites believe that Jewish identity requires that both parents be Jewish, and not only the father. They argue that only patrilineal descent can transmit Jewish identity on the grounds that all descent in the Torah went according to the male line.

The question of what determines Jewish identity in the State of Israel was given new impetus when, in the 1950s, David Ben-Gurion requested opinions on mihu Yehudi ("Who is a Jew") from Jewish religious authorities and intellectuals worldwide to settle citizenship questions. This is still not settled, and occasionally resurfaces in Israeli politics.

Historical definitions of Jewish identity have traditionally been based on halakhic definitions of matrilineal descent, and halakhic conversions. Historical definitions of who is a Jew date back to the codification of the Oral Torah into the Babylonian Talmud, around 200 CE. Interpretations of sections of the Tanakh, such as Deuteronomy 7:1–5, by Jewish sages, are used as a warning against intermarriage between Jews and Canaanites because "[the non-Jewish husband] will cause your child to turn away from Me and they will worship the gods (i.e., idols) of others." Leviticus 24 says that the son in a marriage between a Hebrew woman and an Egyptian man is "of the community of Israel." This is complemented by Ezra 10, where Israelites returning from Babylon vow to put aside their gentile wives and their children. A popular theory is that the rape of Jewish women in captivity brought about the law of Jewish identity being inherited through the maternal line, although scholars challenge this theory citing the Talmudic establishment of the law from the pre-exile period. Since the anti-religious Haskalah movement of the late 18th and 19th centuries, halakhic interpretations of Jewish identity have been challenged.

=== Jewish demographics ===
The total number of Jews worldwide is difficult to assess because the definition of "Jew" is problematic; not all Jews identify themselves as Jewish, and some who identify as Jewish are not considered so by other Jews. According to the Jewish Year Book (1901), the global Jewish population in 1900 was around 11 million. The latest available data is from the World Jewish Population Survey of 2002 and the Jewish Year Calendar (2005). In 2002, according to the Jewish Population Survey, there were 13.3 million Jews around the world. The Jewish Year Calendar cites 14.6 million. It is 0.25% of world population.

Jewish population growth is currently near zero percent, with 0.3% growth from 2000 to 2001. The overall growth rate of Jews in Israel is 1.7% annually, and is consistently growing through natural population growth and extensive immigration. The diaspora countries, by contrast, have low Jewish birth rates, an increasingly elderly age composition, high rates of interreligious marriage and a negative balance of people leaving Judaism versus those joining.

In 2022, the world Jewish population was estimated at 15.2 million, with the majority living in one of two countries: Israel and the United States. About 46.6% of all Jews resided in Israel (6.9 million) and another 6 million Jews resided in the United States, with most of the remainder living in Europe, and other groups spread throughout Canada, Latin America, Asia, Africa, and Australia. Jewish demographics represent diverse historical and cultural trajectories. Ashkenazi Jews, Sephardic Jews, Ethiopian Jews (Beta Israel), Mizrahi Jews, and Romaniote Jews, may possess unique customs and practices.

In Israel, the classification of Jewish observance into categories like Haredi, Dati, Masorti, and Hiloni was developed by sociologists and researchers studying the religious and cultural landscape of Israeli society. These distinctions emerged from surveys and studies conducted by the Israel Central Bureau of Statistics and scholars such as Shmuel Sandler, who explored how religious practices varied among different segments of the Jewish population. The categories were created to better understand the range of religious adherence, from the ultra-Orthodox Haredim to the secular Hilonim, with Dati and Masorti representing intermediary groups.

=== 2020 population estimate ===
Global percentage of adherents by religion. Jews make up about 0.2% of the world's population.

According to Pew Research Center (2020), about 85% of the global Jewish population of 14,780,000 is concentrated in two countries: Israel and the United States, which are the only nations with Jewish populations exceeding one million. Jews constitute 0.2% of the world's population. Outside these two primary countries, the nations with the largest Jewish populations, in descending order, are France, Canada, the United Kingdom, Argentina, and Russia. Even though Jewish birth rates are similar to the global average, the overall population has grown more slowly because it is older on average. By 2010, about one in three Jews worldwide was aged 50 or above, giving Jews the largest proportion of older adults among major religious groups.

Jewish communities are highly concentrated geographically: 96% live in the ten countries with the largest Jewish populations, totaling 14.2 million people. About 500,000 Jews live elsewhere in the world. Today, roughly 27,000 Jews reside in Muslim-majority countries, mainly in Turkey (14,200), Iran (9,100), and Azerbaijan (5,000). In the Arab world, the biggest Jewish populations are found in Morocco (2,000), Tunisia (1,000), and the United Arab Emirates (500).

Regionally, the Jewish population increased in the Middle East and North Africa (up 18% to nearly 7 million), and grew slightly in Asia-Pacific (2%) and North America (1%). It declined in sub-Saharan Africa (down 37% to 50,000), Latin America–Caribbean (down 12% to 390,000), and Europe (down 8% to 1.3 million). Despite these shifts, Jews remained a small and generally stable share of regional populations.

== Jewish religious movements ==
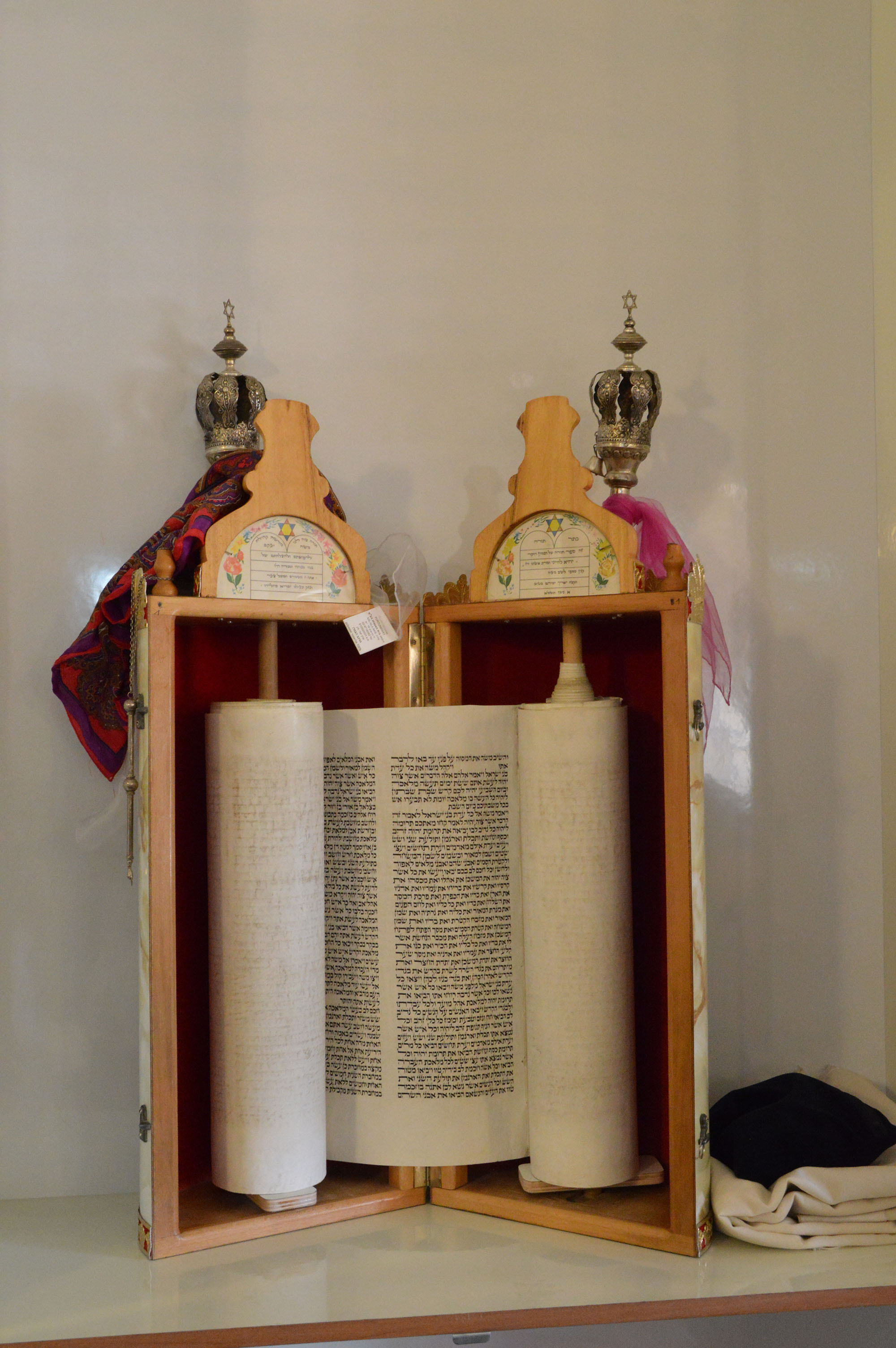
Sephardi-style Torah scroll

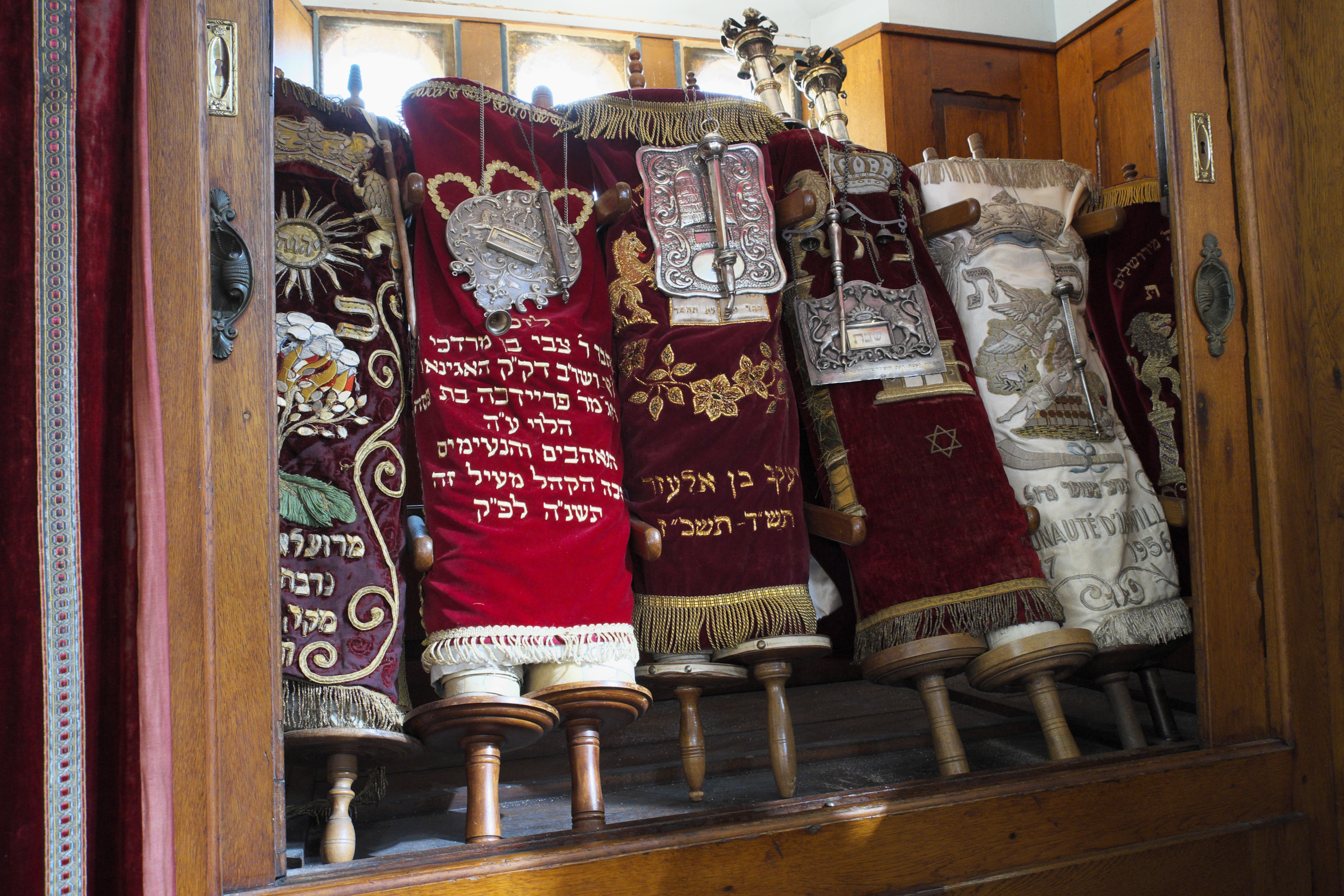
Ashkenazi-style Torah scroll

=== Rabbinic Judaism ===
Rabbinic Judaism (or in some older sources, Rabbinism; Hebrew: "Yahadut Rabanit" – יהדות רבנית) has been the mainstream form of Judaism since the 6th century CE, after the codification of the Talmud. It is characterised by the belief that the Written Torah (Written Law) cannot be correctly interpreted without reference to the Oral Torah and the voluminous literature specifying what behavior is sanctioned by the Law.

The Jewish Enlightenment of the late 18th century resulted in the division of Western Jewry (primarily, the Ashkenazi, but also western part of Sephardim and Italian rite Jews, a.k.a. Italkim, and Greek Romaniote Jews—both last groups are considered distinct from Ashkenazim and Sephardim) into religious movements or denominations, especially in North America and Anglophone countries. The main denominations today outside Israel (where the situation is rather different) are Orthodox, Conservative, and Reform. The notion "traditional Judaism" includes the Orthodox with Conservative or solely the Orthodox Jews:

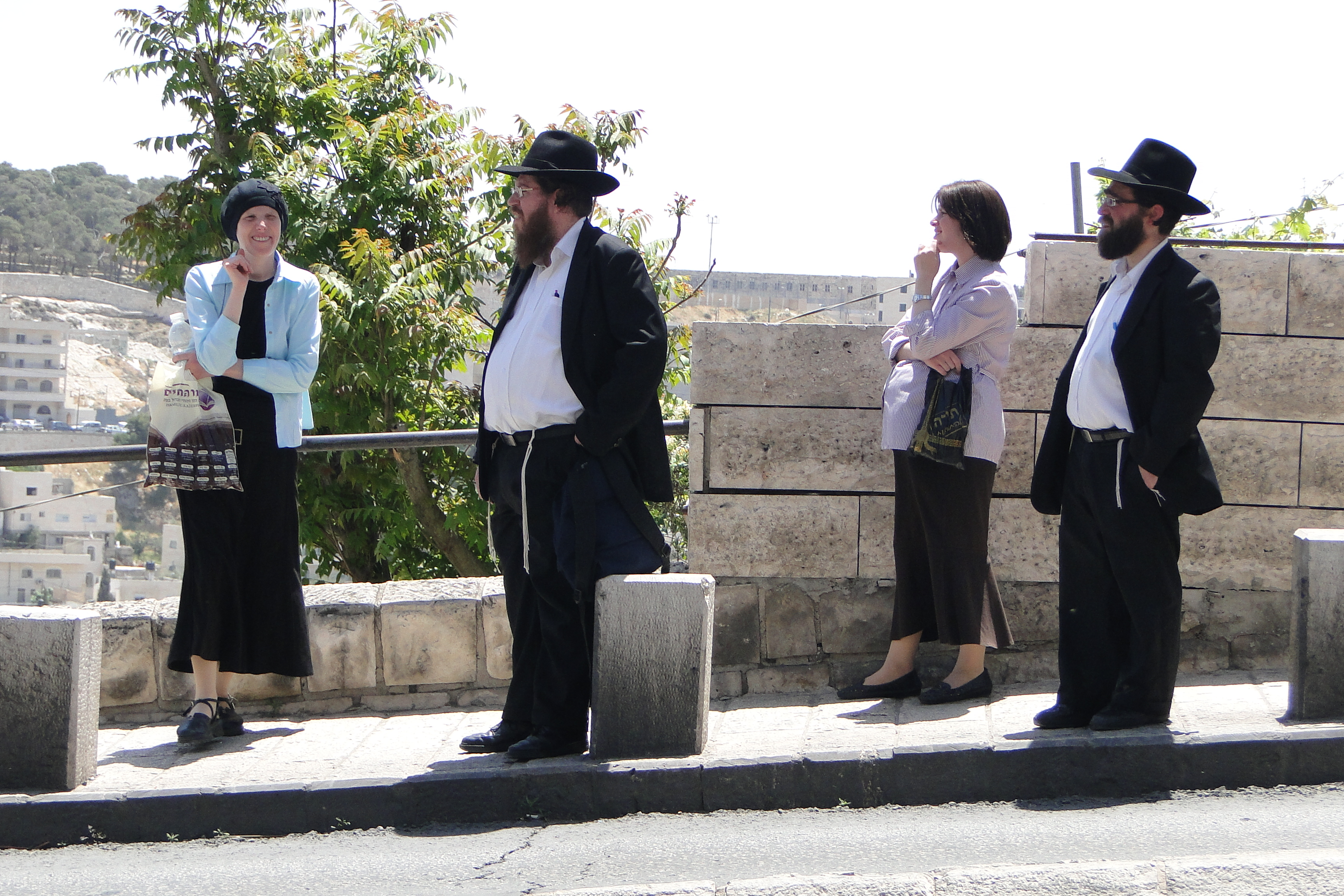
Two Haredi Jewish couples at a bus stop in Jerusalem

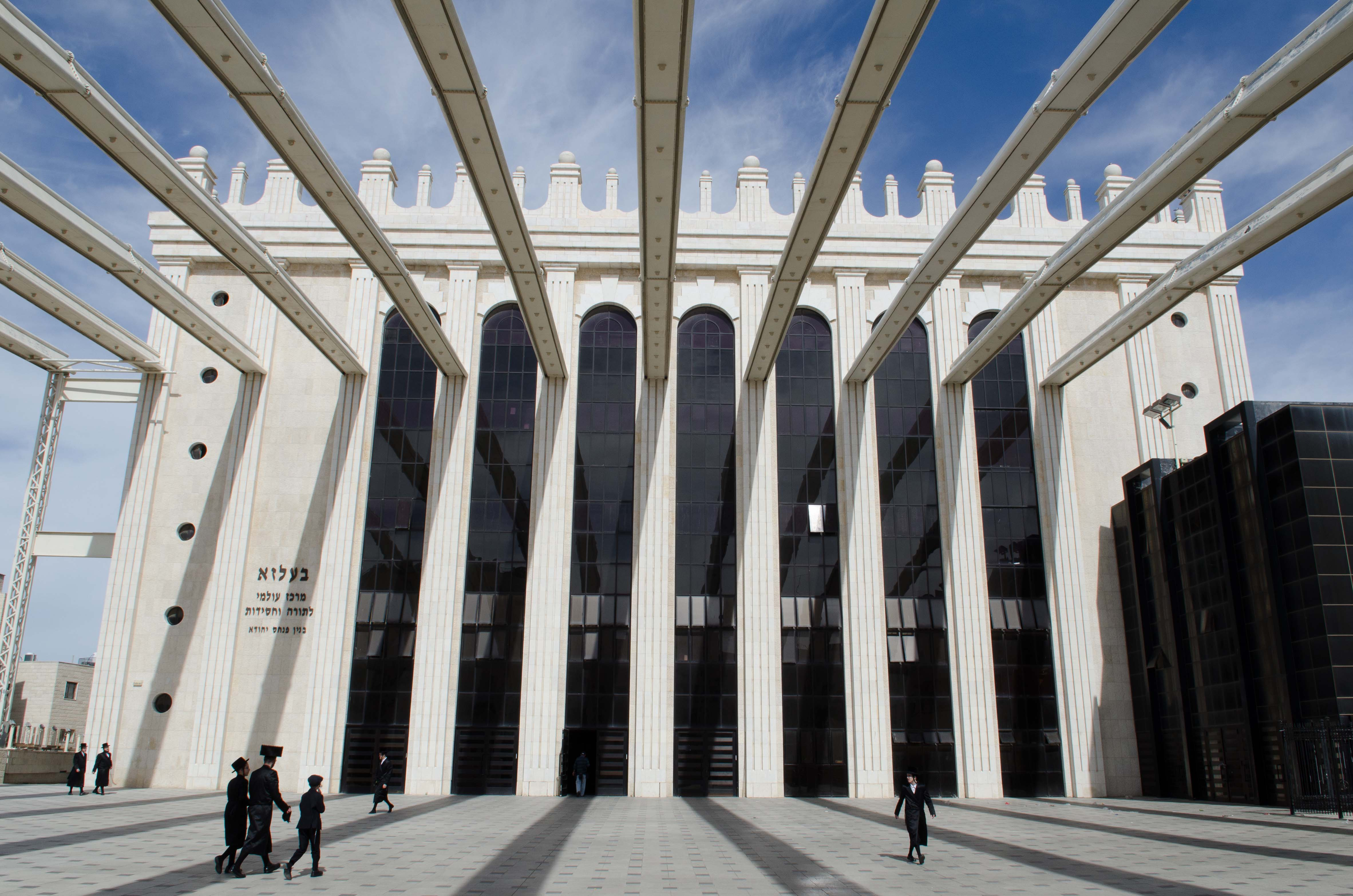
Hasids at front of Belz Great Synagogue, Jerusalem

- Orthodox Judaism holds that both the Written and Oral Torah were divinely revealed to Moses and that the laws within it are binding and unchanging. Orthodox Jews generally consider commentaries on the Shulchan Aruch (a condensed codification of halakha that largely favoured Sephardic traditions) to be the definitive codification of halakha. Orthodoxy places a high importance on the 13 principles of Maimonides as a definition of Jewish faith.

Orthodoxy is often divided into Haredi Judaism and Modern Orthodox Judaism. Haredi is less accommodating to modernity and has less interest in non-Jewish disciplines, and it may be distinguished from Modern Orthodox Judaism in practice by its styles of dress and more stringent practices. Subsets of Haredi Judaism along both ethnic and ideological lines include Hardal ("Nationalist Haredi" within Religious Zionism); Hasidic Judaism, which is rooted in the Kabbalah and distinguished by reliance on a Rebbe or religious teacher; their traditionalist opponents the Misnagdim (also known as Lithuanian or Lita'im); and Sephardic Haredi Judaism, which emerged among Sephardic and Mizrahi (Asian and North African) Jews in Israel. "Centrist" Orthodoxy (Joseph B. Soloveitchik) is sometimes also distinguished.

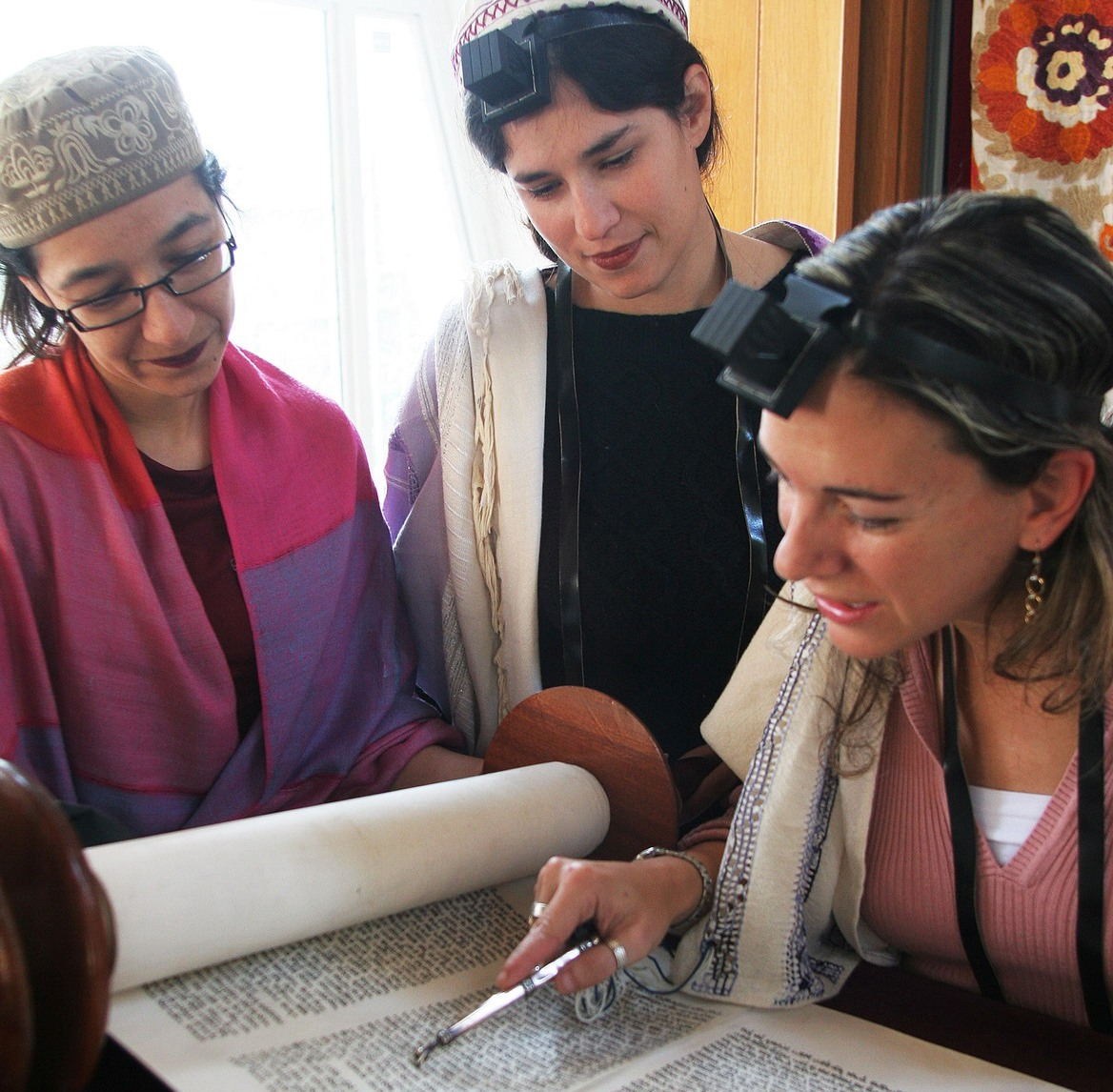
Conservative women rabbis, Israel

- Conservative Judaism (known as Masorti Judaism outside North America and Israel) is characterized by a commitment to traditional halakha and customs, including observance of Shabbat and kashrut, a deliberately non-fundamentalist teaching of Jewish principles of faith, a positive attitude toward modern culture, and an acceptance of both traditional rabbinic and modern scholarship when considering Jewish religious texts. Conservative Judaism teaches that halakha is not static, but has always developed in response to changing conditions. It holds that the Torah is a divine document written by prophets inspired by God and reflecting his will, but rejects the Orthodox position that it was dictated by God to Moses. Conservative Judaism holds that the Oral Law is divine and normative, but holds that both the Written and Oral Law may be interpreted by the rabbis to reflect modern sensibilities and suit modern conditions.
- Reform Judaism, called Liberal or Progressive Judaism in many countries, defines Judaism in relatively universalist terms, rejects most of the ritual and ceremonial laws of the Torah while observing moral laws, and emphasizes the ethical call of the Prophets. Reform Judaism has developed an egalitarian prayer service in the vernacular (along with Hebrew in many cases) and emphasizes personal connection to Jewish tradition.
- Reconstructionist Judaism, like Reform Judaism, does not hold that halakha, as such, requires observance, but unlike Reform, Reconstructionist thought emphasizes the role of the community in deciding what observances to follow. It is sometimes recognized as the fourth major stream of Judaism.
- Jewish Renewal is a recent North American movement which focuses on spirituality and social justice but does not address issues of halakha. Men and women participate equally in prayer.
- Humanistic Judaism is a small non-theistic movement centered in North America and Israel that emphasizes Jewish culture and history as the sources of Jewish identity.
- Subbotniks (Sabbatarians) are a movement of Jews of Russian ethnic origin in the 18th–20th centuries, the majority of whom belonged to Rabbinic and Karaite Judaism. Many settled in the Holy Land as part of the Zionist First Aliyah to escape oppression in the Russian Empire and later mostly intermarried with other Jews, their descendants included Alexander Zaïd, Major-General Alik Ron, and the mother of Ariel Sharon.

==== Sephardic and Mizrahi Judaism ====
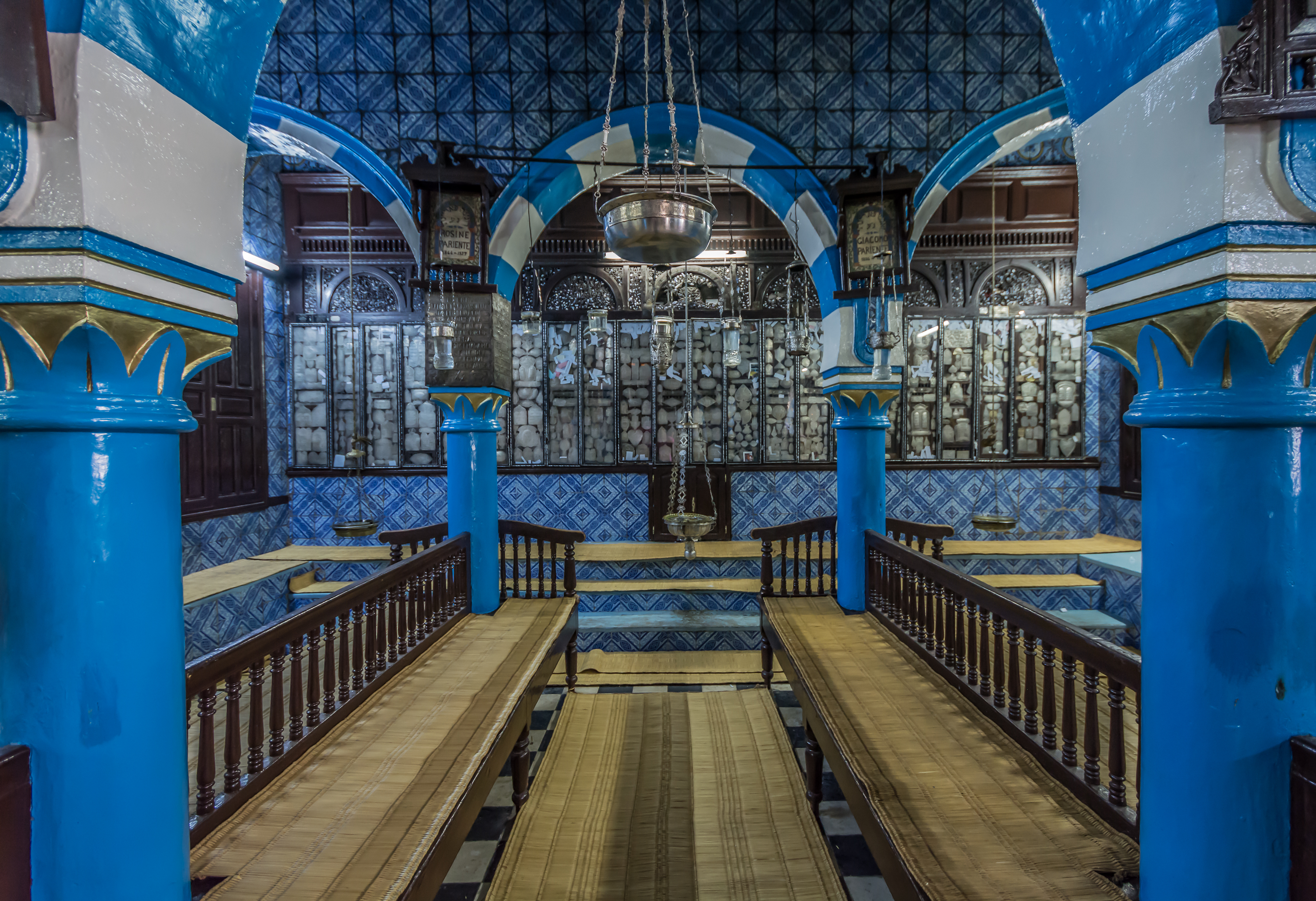
El Ghriba synagogue in Djerba, Tunisia

While traditions and customs vary between discrete communities, it can be said that Sephardi (Iberian, for example, most Jews from France and the Netherlands) and Mizrahi (Oriental) Jewish communities do not generally adhere to the "movement" framework popular in and among Ashkenazi Jewry. Historically, Sephardi and Mizrahi communities have eschewed denominations in favour of a "big tent" approach. This is particularly the case in contemporary Israel, which is home to the largest communities of Sephardi and Mizrahi Jews in the world. (However, individual Sephardi and Mizrahi Jews or some their communities may be members of or attend synagogues that do adhere to one Ashkenazi-inflected movement or another.) Among the pioneers of Reform Judaism in the 1820s there was the Sephardic congregation Beth Elohim in Charleston, South Carolina. A part of the European Sephardim were also linked with the Judaic modernization.

Sephardi and Mizrahi observance of Judaism tends toward the traditional (Orthodox) and prayer rites are reflective of this, with the text of each rite being largely unchanged since their respective inception. Observant Sephardim may follow the teachings of a particular rabbi or school of thought; for example, the Sephardic Chief Rabbi of Israel.

==== Jewish movements in Israel ====
In Israel, as in the West, Judaism is also divided into major Orthodox, Conservative and Reform traditions. At the same time, for statistical and practical purposes, a different division of society is used there on the basis of a person's attitude to religion.

Most Jewish Israelis classify themselves as "secular" (hiloni), "traditional" (masorti), "religious" (dati) or "ultra-religious" (haredi). The term "secular" is more popular as a self-description among Israeli families of western (European) origin, whose Jewish identity may be a very powerful force in their lives, but who see it as largely independent of traditional religious belief and practice. This portion of the population largely ignores organized religious life, be it of the official Israeli rabbinate (Orthodox) or of the liberal movements common to diaspora Judaism (Reform, Conservative).

The term "traditional" (masorti) is most common as a self-description among Israeli families of "eastern" origin (i.e., the Middle East, Central Asia, and North Africa). This term, as commonly used, has nothing to do with Conservative Judaism, which also names itself "Masorti" outside North America. Only a few authors, like Elliot Nelson Dorff, consider the American Conservative (masorti) movement and Israeli masorti sector to be one and the same. There is a great deal of ambiguity in the ways "secular" and "traditional" are used in Israel: they often overlap, and they cover an extremely wide range in terms of worldview and practical religious observance. The term "Orthodox" is not popular in Israeli discourse, although the percentage of Jews who come under that category is far greater than in the Jewish diaspora. What would be called "Orthodox" in the diaspora includes what is commonly called dati (religious, including religious zionist) or haredi (ultra-Orthodox) in Israel. The former term includes what is called "religious Zionism" or the "National Orthodox" community, as well as what has become known over the past decade or so as haredi-leumi (nationalist haredi), or "Hardal", which combines a largely haredi lifestyle with nationalist ideology. (Some people, in Yiddish, also refer to observant Orthodox Jews as frum, as opposed to frei (more liberal Jews)).

=== Karaites and Samaritans ===
Karaite Judaism defines itself as the remnants of the non-Rabbinic Jewish sects of the Second Temple period, such as the Sadducees. The Karaites ("Scripturalists") accept only the Hebrew Bible and what they view as the Peshat ("simple" meaning); they do not accept non-biblical writings as authoritative. Some European Karaites do not see themselves as part of the Jewish community at all, although most do.

The Samaritans, a very small community located entirely around Mount Gerizim in the Nablus/Shechem region of the West Bank and in Holon, near Tel Aviv in Israel, regard themselves as the descendants of the Israelites of the Iron Age kingdom of Israel. Their religious practices are based on the literal text of the written Torah (Five Books of Moses), which they view as the only authoritative scripture (with a special regard also for the Samaritan Book of Joshua).

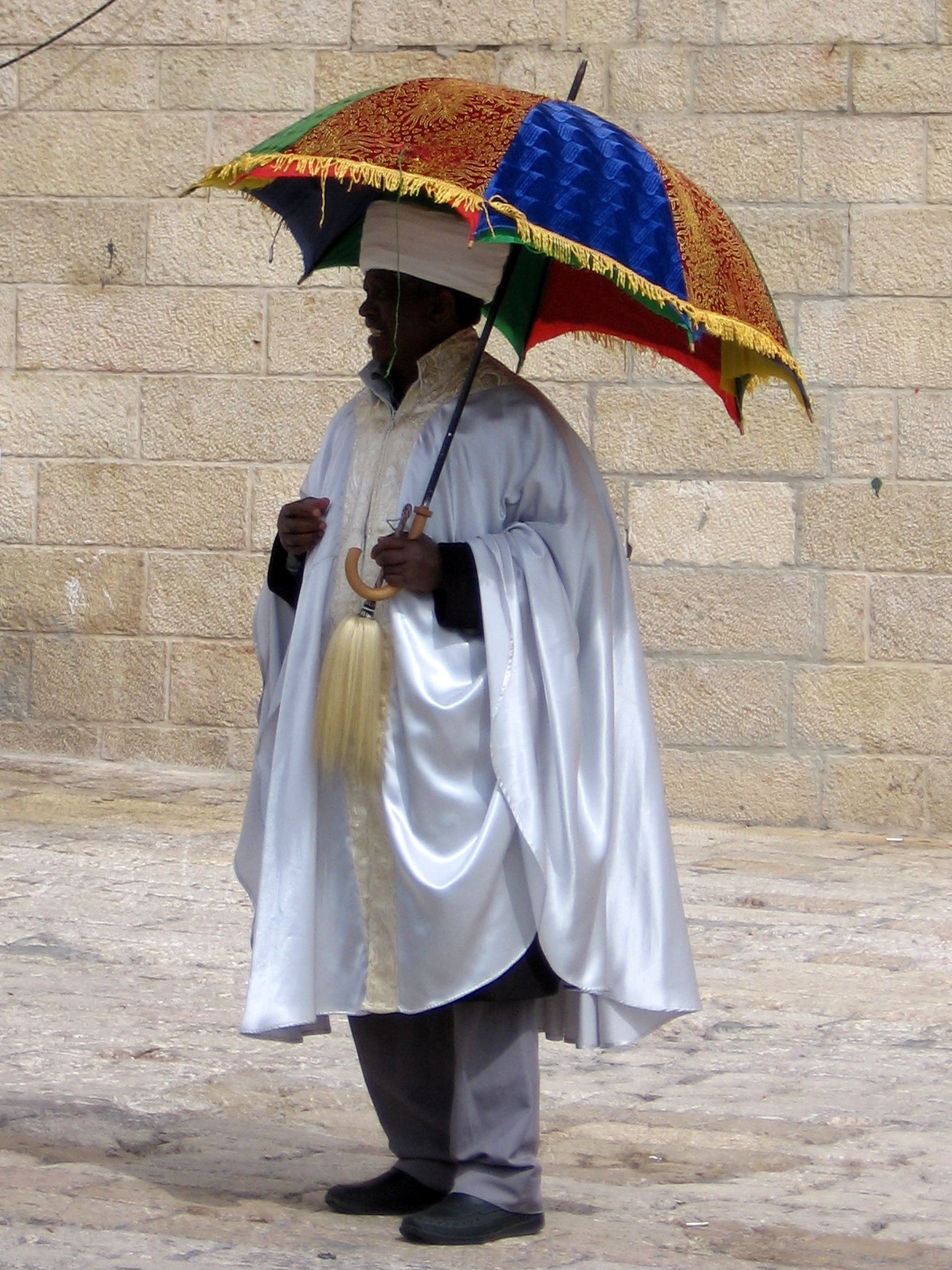
Beta Israeli Kahen at the Western Wall

=== Haymanot (Ethiopian Judaism) ===
Haymanot (meaning "religion" in Ge'ez and Amharic) refers the Judaism practiced by Ethiopian Jews. This version of Judaism differs substantially from Rabbinic, Karaite, and Samaritan Judaisms, Ethiopian Jews having diverged from their coreligionists earlier. Sacred scriptures (the Orit) are written in Ge'ez, not Hebrew, and dietary laws are based strictly on the text of the Orit, without explication from ancillary commentaries. Holidays also differ, with some Rabbinic holidays not observed in Ethiopian Jewish communities, and some additional holidays, like Sigd.

=== Noahide (B'nei Noah movement) ===
Noahidism is a Jewish religious movement based on the Seven Laws of Noah and their traditional interpretations within Rabbinic Judaism. According to the halakha, non-Jews (gentiles) are not obligated to convert to Judaism, but they are required to observe the Seven Laws of Noah to be assured of a place in the world to come (olam ha-ba), the final reward of the righteous. The divinely ordained penalty for violating any of the Laws of Noah is discussed in the Talmud, but in practical terms it is subject to the working legal system which is established by the society at large. Those who subscribe to the observance of the Noahide covenant are referred to as B'nei Noach (Hebrew: בני נח, 'Children of Noah') or Noahides (/ˈnoʊ.ə.haɪds/). Supporting organizations have been established around the world over the past decades by both Noahides and Orthodox Jews.

Historically, the Hebrew term B'nei Noach has applied to all non-Jews as descendants of Noah. However, nowadays it's primarily used to refer specifically to those non-Jews who observe the Seven Laws of Noah.

== Jewish observances ==
=== Jewish ethics ===
Jewish ethics may be guided by halakhic traditions, by customs of etiquette, by other moral principles, or by central Jewish virtues. Jewish ethical practice is typically understood to be marked by values such as justice, truth, peace, loving-kindness (chesed), compassion, humility, and self-respect. Specific Jewish ethical practices include practices of charity (tzedakah) and refraining from negative speech (lashon hara). Proper ethical practices regarding sexuality and many other issues are subjects of dispute among Jews.

=== Prayers ===
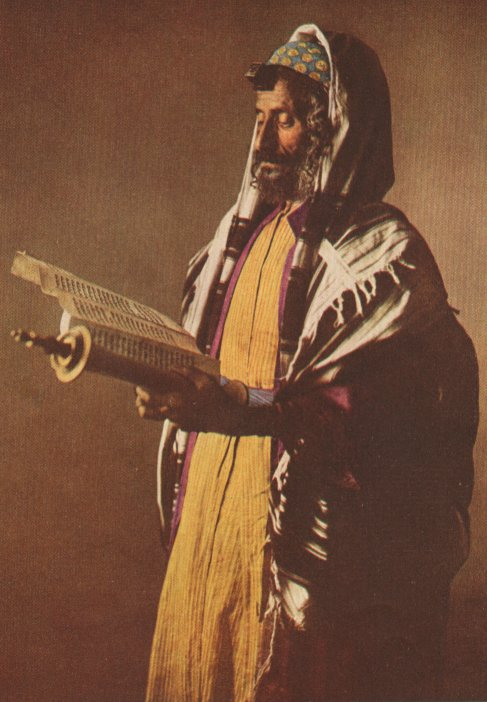
A Yemenite Jew at morning prayers, wearing a kippah skullcap, prayer shawl and tefillin

Traditionally, Jews recite prayers three times daily, Shacharit, Mincha, and Ma'ariv with a fourth prayer, Mussaf added on Shabbat and holidays. At the heart of each service is the Amidah or Shemoneh Esrei. Another key prayer in many services is the declaration of faith, the Shema Yisrael (or Shema). The Shema is the recitation of a verse from the Torah (Deuteronomy 6:4): Shema Yisrael Adonai Eloheinu Adonai Echad—"Hear, O Israel! The Lord is our God! The Lord is One!"

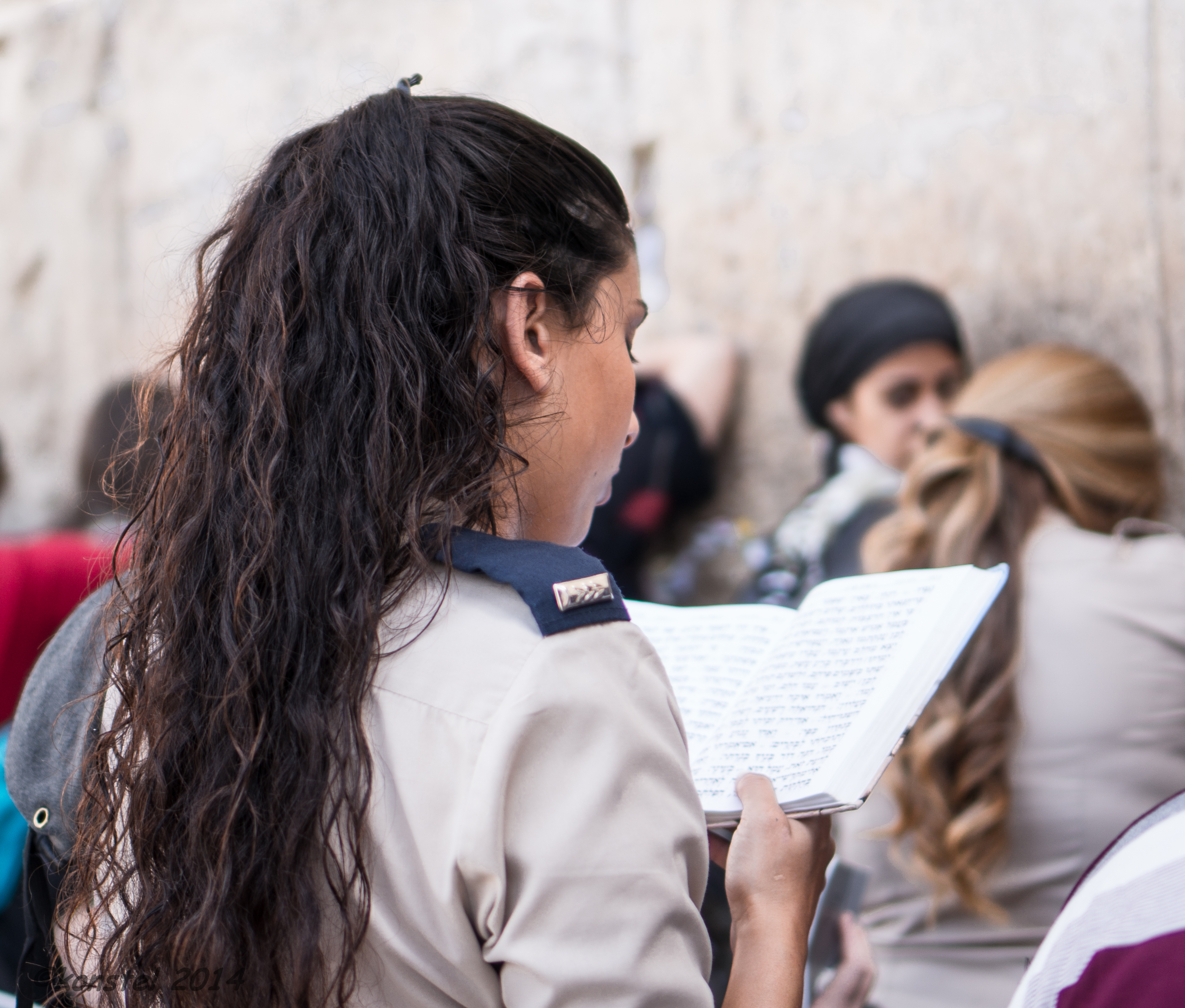
An Israeli female soldier prays at the Western Wall

Most of the prayers in a traditional Jewish service can be recited in solitary prayer, although communal prayer is preferred. Communal prayer requires a quorum of ten adult Jews, called a minyan. In nearly all Orthodox and a few Conservative circles, only male Jews are counted toward a minyan; most Conservative Jews and members of other Jewish denominations count female Jews as well.

In addition to prayer services, observant traditional Jews recite prayers and benedictions throughout the day when performing various acts. Prayers are recited upon waking up in the morning, before eating or drinking different foods, after eating a meal, and so on.

The approach to prayer varies among the Jewish denominations. Differences can include the texts of prayers, the frequency of prayer, the number of prayers recited at various religious events, the use of musical instruments and choral music, and whether prayers are recited in the traditional liturgical languages or the vernacular. In general, Orthodox and Conservative congregations adhere most closely to tradition, and Reform and Reconstructionist synagogues are more likely to incorporate translations and contemporary writings in their services. Also, in most Conservative synagogues, and all Reform and Reconstructionist congregations, women participate in prayer services on an equal basis with men, including roles traditionally filled only by men, such as reading from the Torah. In addition, many Reform temples use musical accompaniment such as organs and mixed choirs.

=== Religious clothing ===
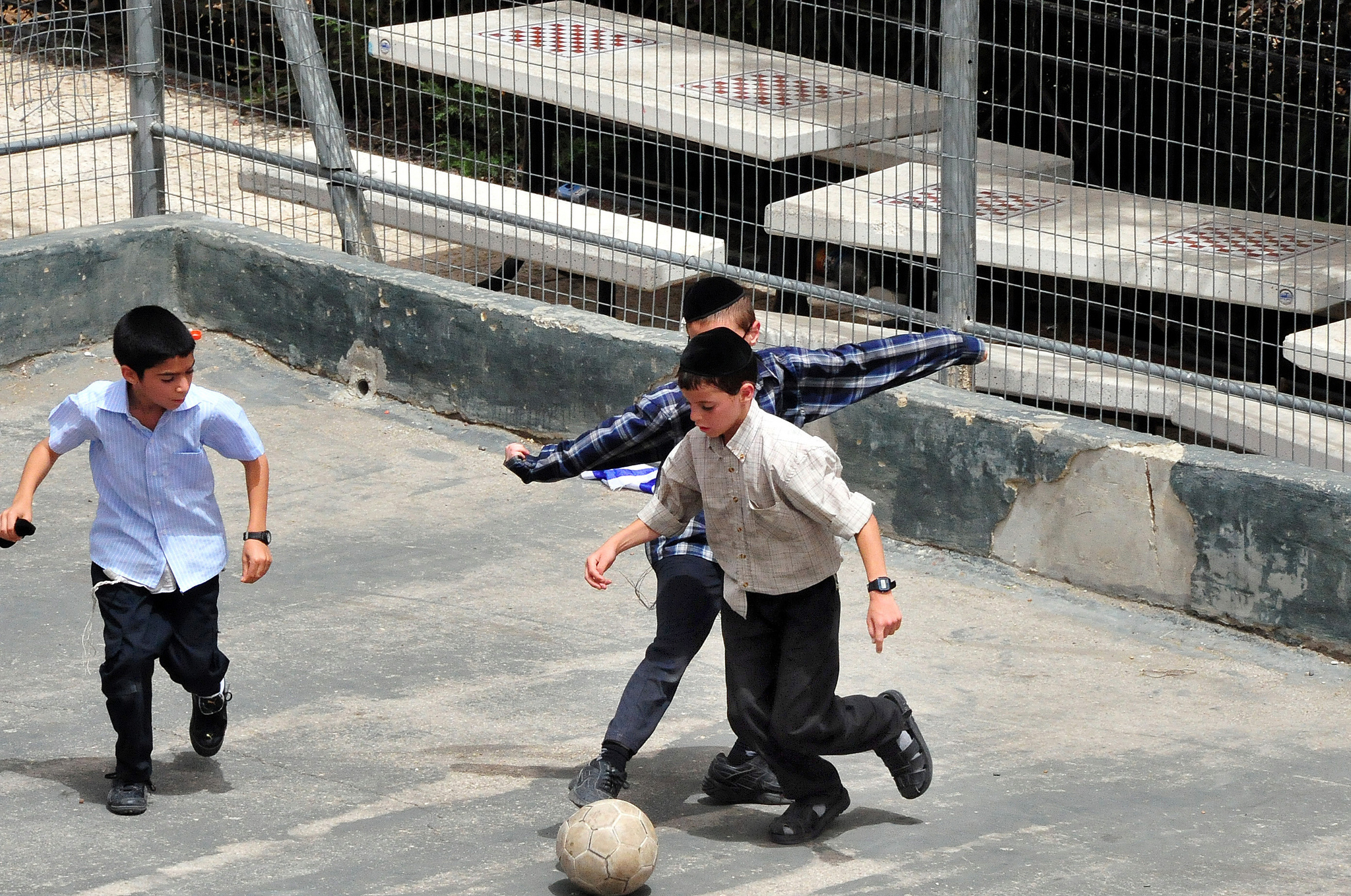
Jewish boys wearing tzitzit and kippot play soccer in Jerusalem

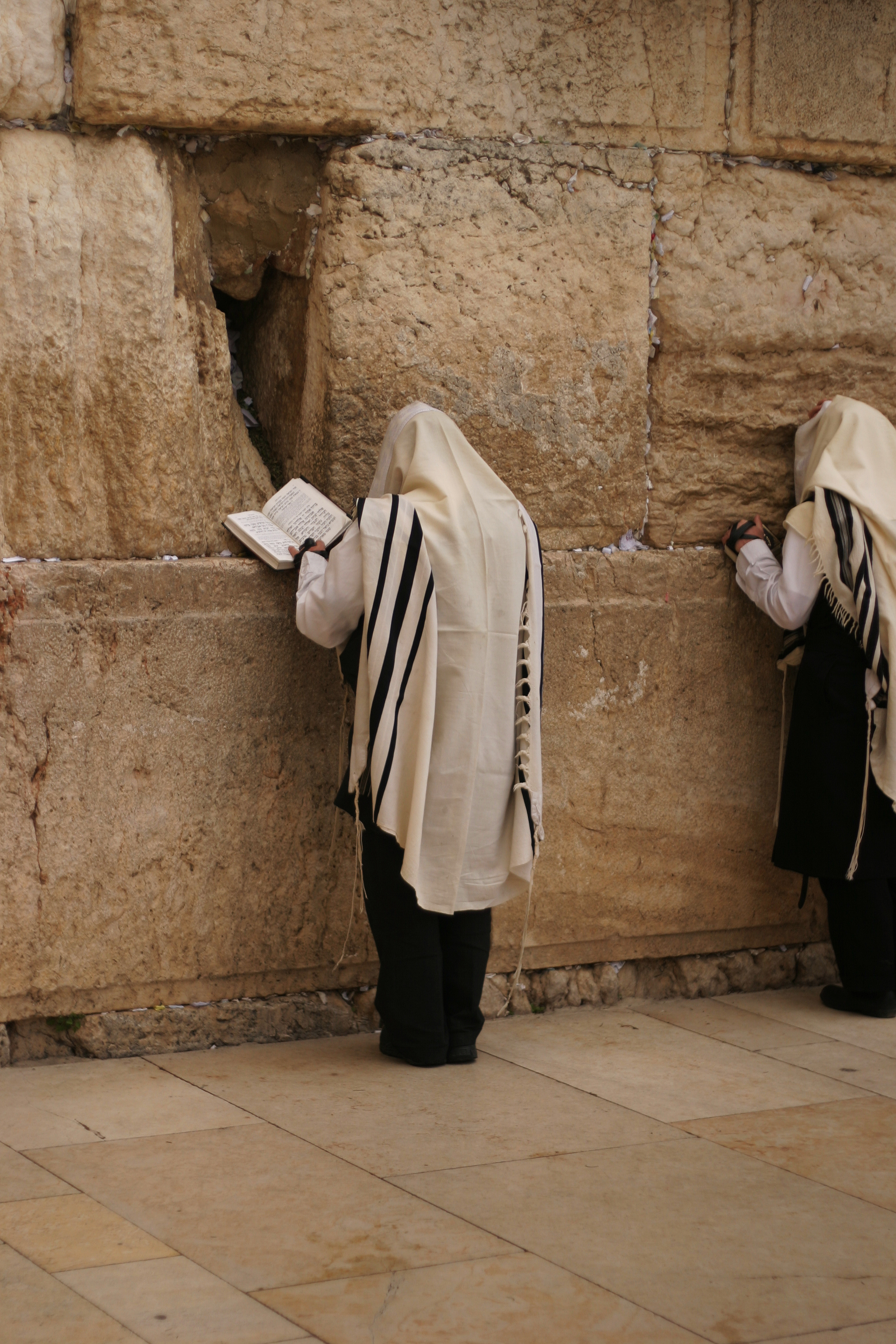
Men wearing tallitot pray at the Western Wall

A kippah (Hebrew: כִּפָּה, plural kippot; Yiddish: יאַרמלקע, yarmulke) is a slightly rounded brimless skullcap worn by many Jews while praying, eating, reciting blessings, or studying Jewish religious texts, and at all times by some Jewish men. In Orthodox communities, only men wear kippot; in non-Orthodox communities, some women also wear kippot. Kippot range in size from a small round beanie that covers only the back of the head to a large, snug cap that covers the whole crown.

Tzitzit (Hebrew: צִיציִת) (Ashkenazi pronunciation: tzitzis) are special knotted "fringes" or "tassels" found on the four corners of the tallit (Hebrew: טַלִּית) (Ashkenazi pronunciation: tallis), or prayer shawl. The tallit is worn by Jewish men and some Jewish women during the prayer service. Customs vary regarding when a Jew begins wearing a tallit. In the Sephardi community, boys wear a tallit from bar mitzvah age. In some Ashkenazi communities, it is customary to wear one only after marriage. A tallit katan (small tallit) is a fringed garment worn under the clothing throughout the day. In some Orthodox circles, the fringes are allowed to hang freely outside the clothing.

Tefillin (Hebrew: תְפִלִּין), known in English as phylacteries (from the Greek word φυλακτήριον, meaning safeguard or amulet), are two square leather boxes containing biblical verses, attached to the forehead and wound around the left arm by leather straps. They are worn during weekday morning prayer by observant Jewish men and some Jewish women.

A kittel (Yiddish: קיטל), a white knee-length overgarment, is worn by prayer leaders and some observant traditional Jews on the High Holidays. It is traditional for the head of the household to wear a kittel at the Passover seder in some communities, and some grooms wear one under the wedding canopy. Jewish males are buried in a tallit and sometimes also a kittel which are part of the tachrichim (burial garments).

=== Jewish holidays ===
Jewish holidays are special days in the Jewish calendar, which celebrate moments in Jewish history, as well as central themes in the relationship between God and the world, such as creation, revelation, and redemption.

==== Shabbat ====
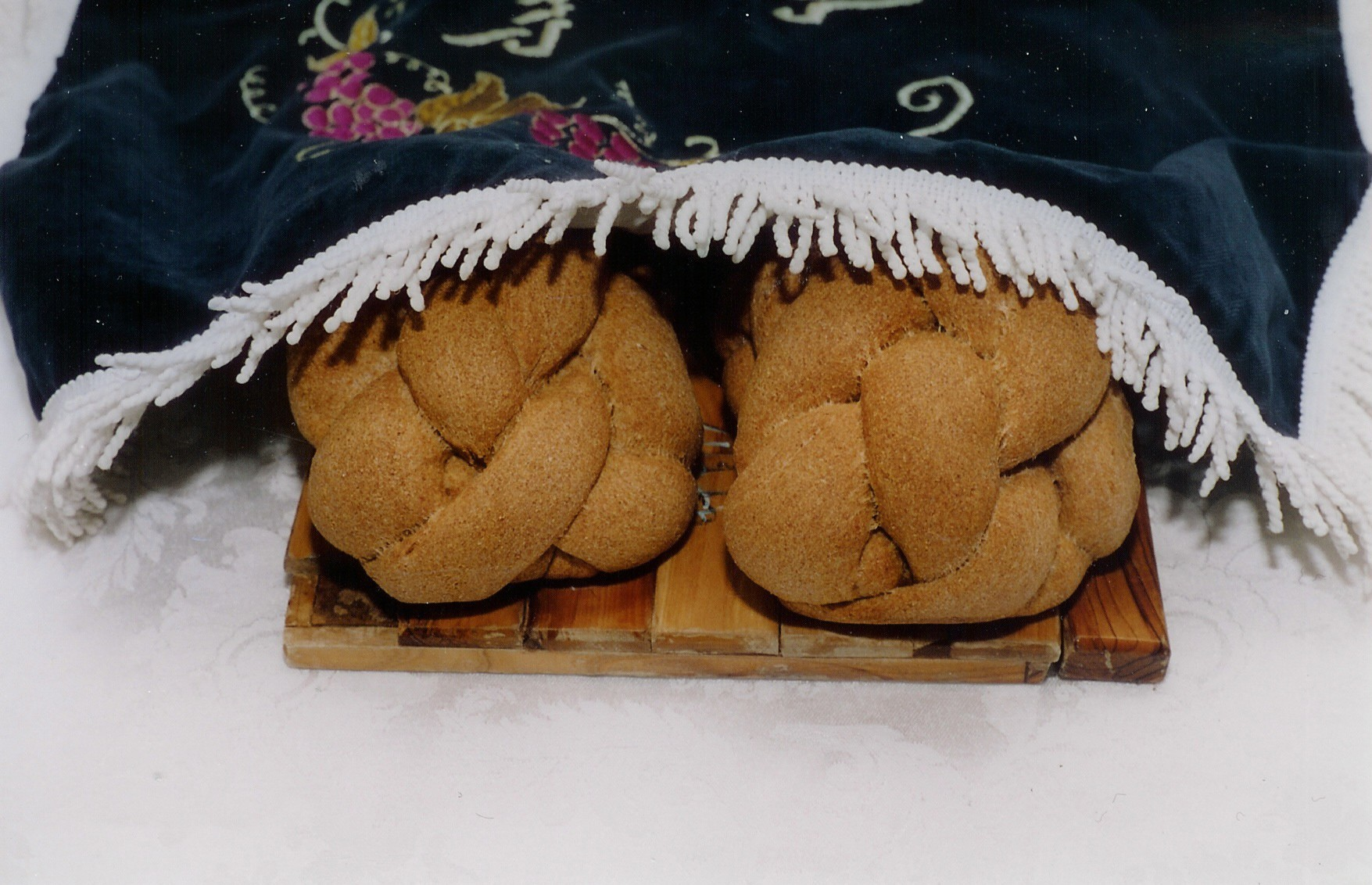
Two braided Shabbat challot placed under an embroidered challah cover at the start of the Shabbat meal

Shabbat, the weekly day of rest lasting from shortly before sundown on Friday night to nightfall on Saturday night, commemorates God's day of rest after six days of creation. It plays a pivotal role in Jewish practice and is governed by a large corpus of religious law. At sundown on Friday, the woman of the house welcomes the Shabbat by lighting two or more candles and reciting a blessing. The evening meal begins with the Kiddush, a blessing recited aloud over a cup of wine, and the Mohtzi, a blessing recited over the bread. It is customary to have challah, two braided loaves of bread, on the table. During Shabbat, Jews are forbidden to engage in any activity that falls under 39 categories of melakhah, translated literally as "work". In fact, the activities banned on the Sabbath are not "work" in the usual sense: They include such actions as lighting a fire, writing, using money and carrying in the public domain. The prohibition of lighting a fire has been extended in the modern era to driving a car, which involves burning fuel and using electricity.

==== Three pilgrimage festivals ====
Jewish holy days (chaggim), celebrate landmark events in Jewish history, such as the Exodus from Egypt and the giving of the Torah, and sometimes mark the change of seasons and transitions in the agricultural cycle. The three major festivals, Sukkot, Passover and Shavuot, are called "regalim" (derived from the Hebrew word "regel", or foot). On the three regalim, it was customary for the Israelites to make pilgrimages to Jerusalem to offer sacrifices in the Temple:

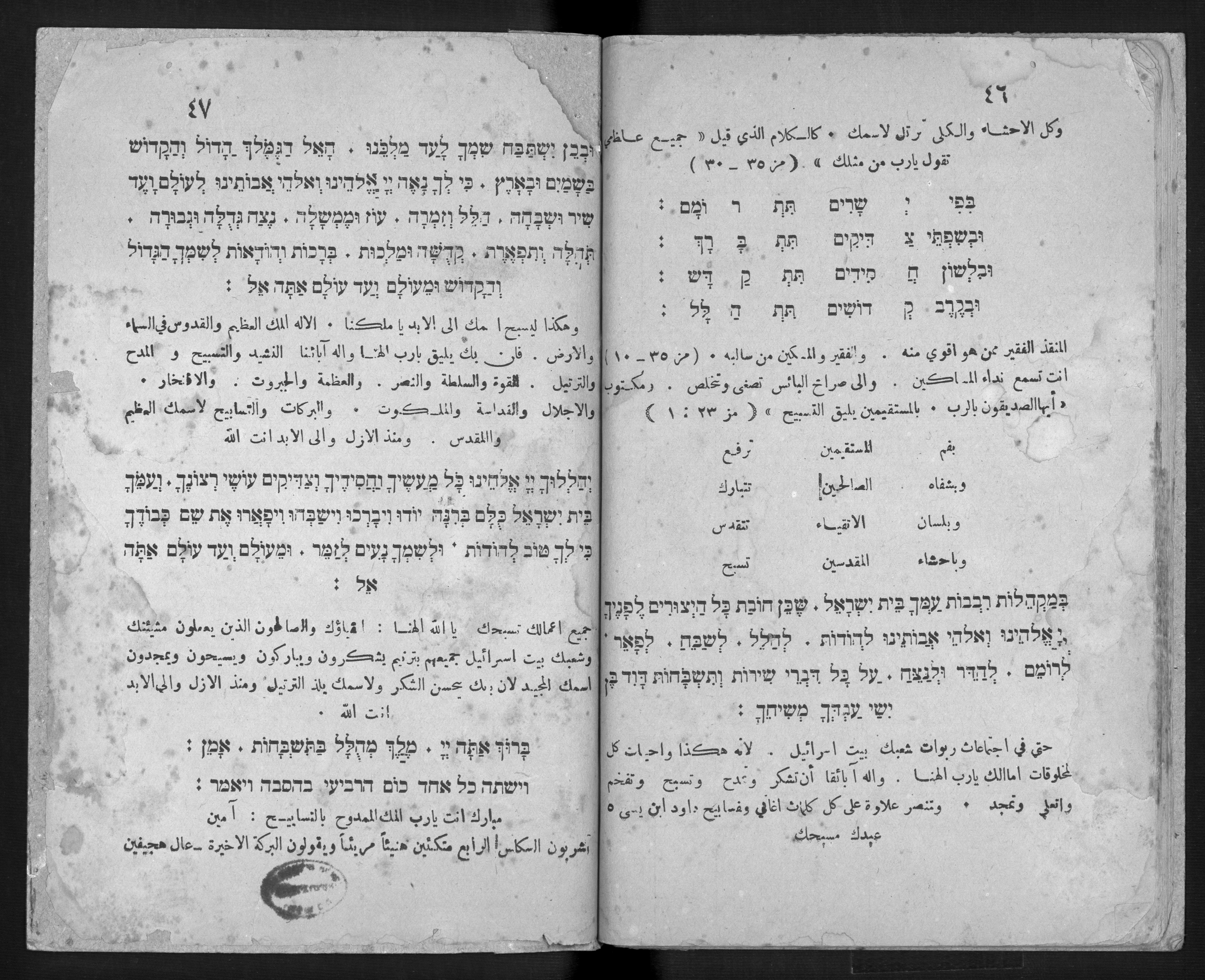
- A haggadah used by the Jewish community of Cairo in Arabic
  Passover (Pesach) is a week-long holiday beginning on the evening of the 14th day of Nisan (the first month in the Hebrew calendar), that commemorates the Exodus from Egypt. Outside Israel, Passover is celebrated for eight days. In ancient times, it coincided with the barley harvest. It is the only holiday that centers on home-service, the Seder. Leavened products (chametz) are removed from the house prior to the holiday and are not consumed throughout the week. Homes are thoroughly cleaned to ensure no bread or bread by-products remain, and a symbolic burning of the last vestiges of chametz is conducted on the morning of the Seder. Matzo is eaten instead of bread.
- Shavuot ("Pentecost" or "Feast of Weeks") celebrates the revelation of the Torah to the Israelites on Mount Sinai. Also known as the Festival of Bikurim, or first fruits, it coincided in biblical times with the wheat harvest. Shavuot customs include all-night study marathons known as Tikkun Leil Shavuot, eating dairy foods (cheesecake and blintzes are special favorites), reading the Book of Ruth, decorating homes and synagogues with greenery, and wearing white clothing, symbolizing purity.
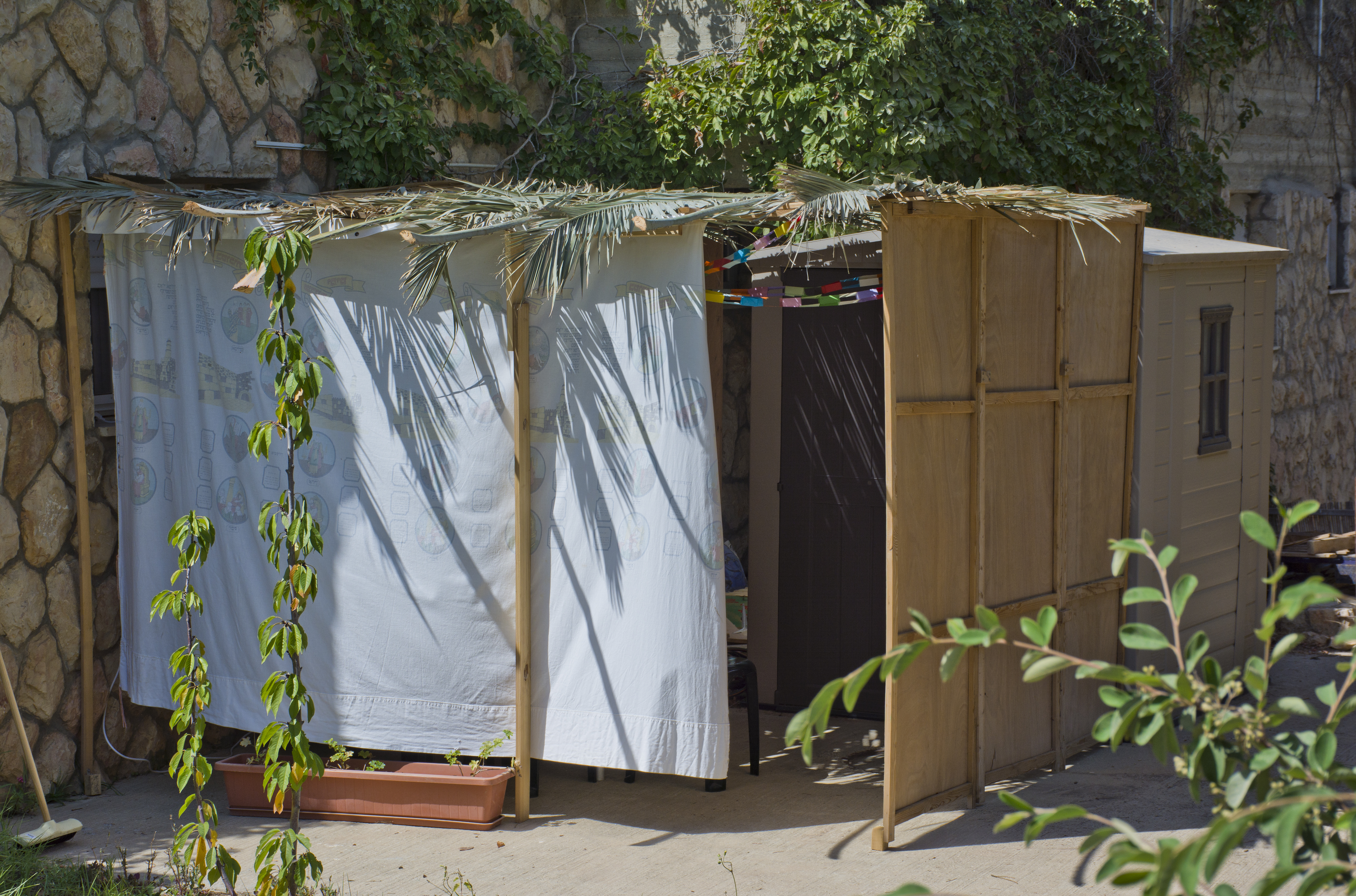
- A sukkah
  Sukkot ("Tabernacles" or "The Festival of Booths") commemorates the Israelites' forty years of wandering through the desert on their way to the Promised Land. It is celebrated through the construction of temporary booths called sukkot (sing. sukkah) that represent the temporary shelters of the Israelites during their wandering. It coincides with the fruit harvest and marks the end of the agricultural cycle. Jews around the world eat in sukkot for seven days and nights. Sukkot concludes with Shemini Atzeret, where Jews begin to pray for rain and Simchat Torah, "Rejoicing of the Torah", a holiday which marks reaching the end of the Torah reading cycle and beginning all over again. The occasion is celebrated with singing and dancing with the Torah scrolls. Shemini Atzeret and Simchat Torah are technically considered to be a separate holiday and not a part of Sukkot.

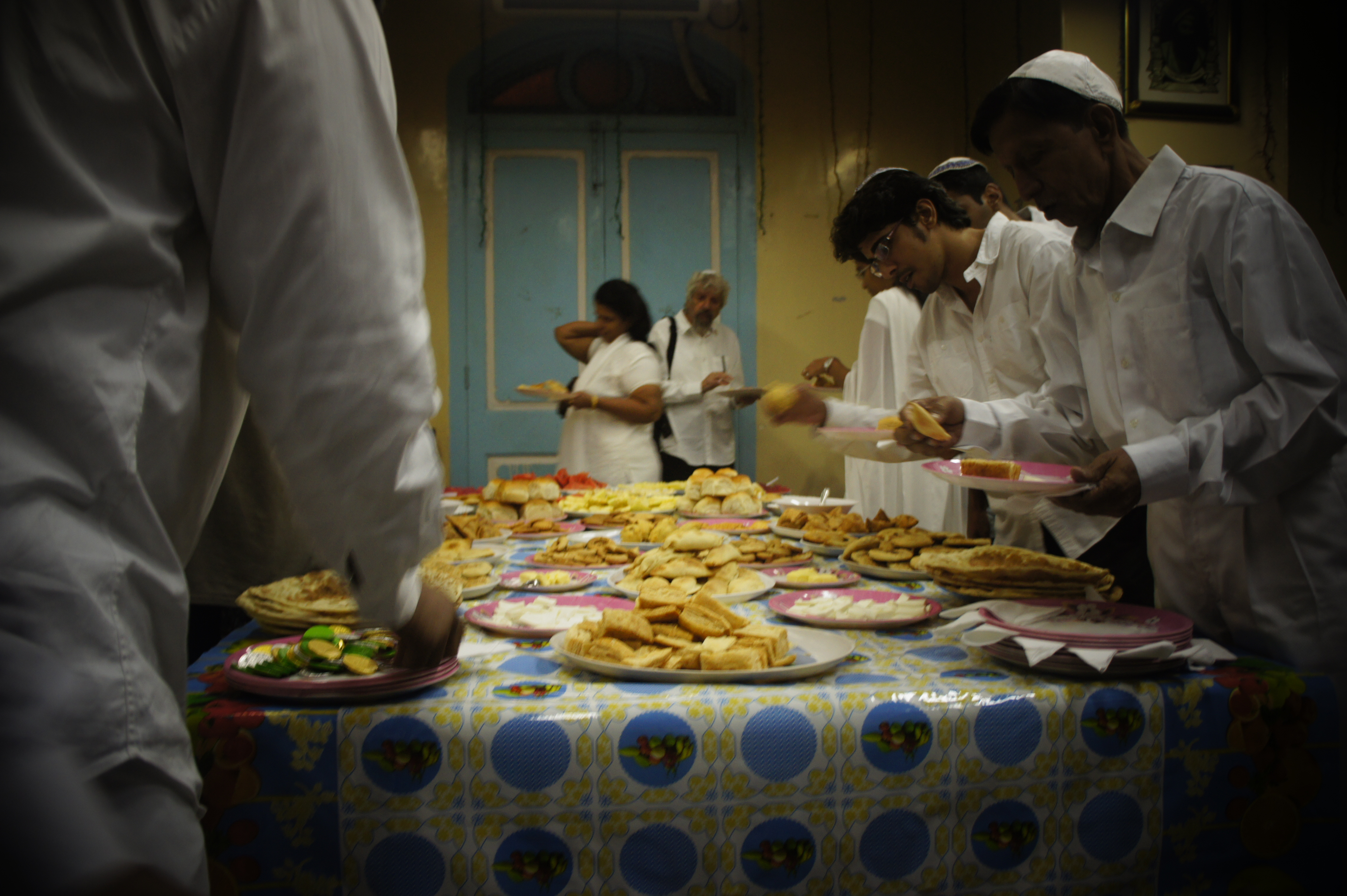
Jews in Mumbai break the Yom Kippur fast with roti and samosas

==== High Holy Days ====
The High Holidays (Yamim Noraim or "Days of Awe") revolve around judgment and forgiveness:

- Rosh Hashanah, (also Yom Ha-Zikkaron or "Day of Remembrance", and Yom Teruah, or "Day of the Sounding of the Shofar"). Rosh Hashanah is the Jewish New Year (literally, "head of the year"), although it falls on the first day of the seventh month of the Hebrew calendar, Tishri. Rosh Hashanah marks the beginning of the 10-day period of atonement leading up to Yom Kippur, during which Jews are commanded to search their souls and make amends for sins committed, intentionally or not, throughout the year. Holiday customs include blowing the shofar, or ram's horn, in the synagogue, eating apples and honey, and saying blessings over a variety of symbolic foods, such as pomegranates.
- Yom Kippur, ("Day of Atonement") is the holiest day of the Jewish year. It is a day of communal fasting and praying for forgiveness for one's sins. Observant Jews spend the entire day in the synagogue, sometimes with a short break in the afternoon, reciting prayers from a special holiday prayerbook called a "Machzor". Many non-religious Jews make a point of attending synagogue services and fasting on Yom Kippur. On the eve of Yom Kippur, before candles are lit, a prefast meal, the "seuda mafseket", is eaten. Synagogue services on the eve of Yom Kippur begin with the Kol Nidre prayer. It is customary to wear white on Yom Kippur, especially for Kol Nidre, and leather shoes are not worn. The following day, prayers are held from morning to evening. The final prayer service, called "Ne'ilah", ends with a long blast of the shofar.

==== Purim ====
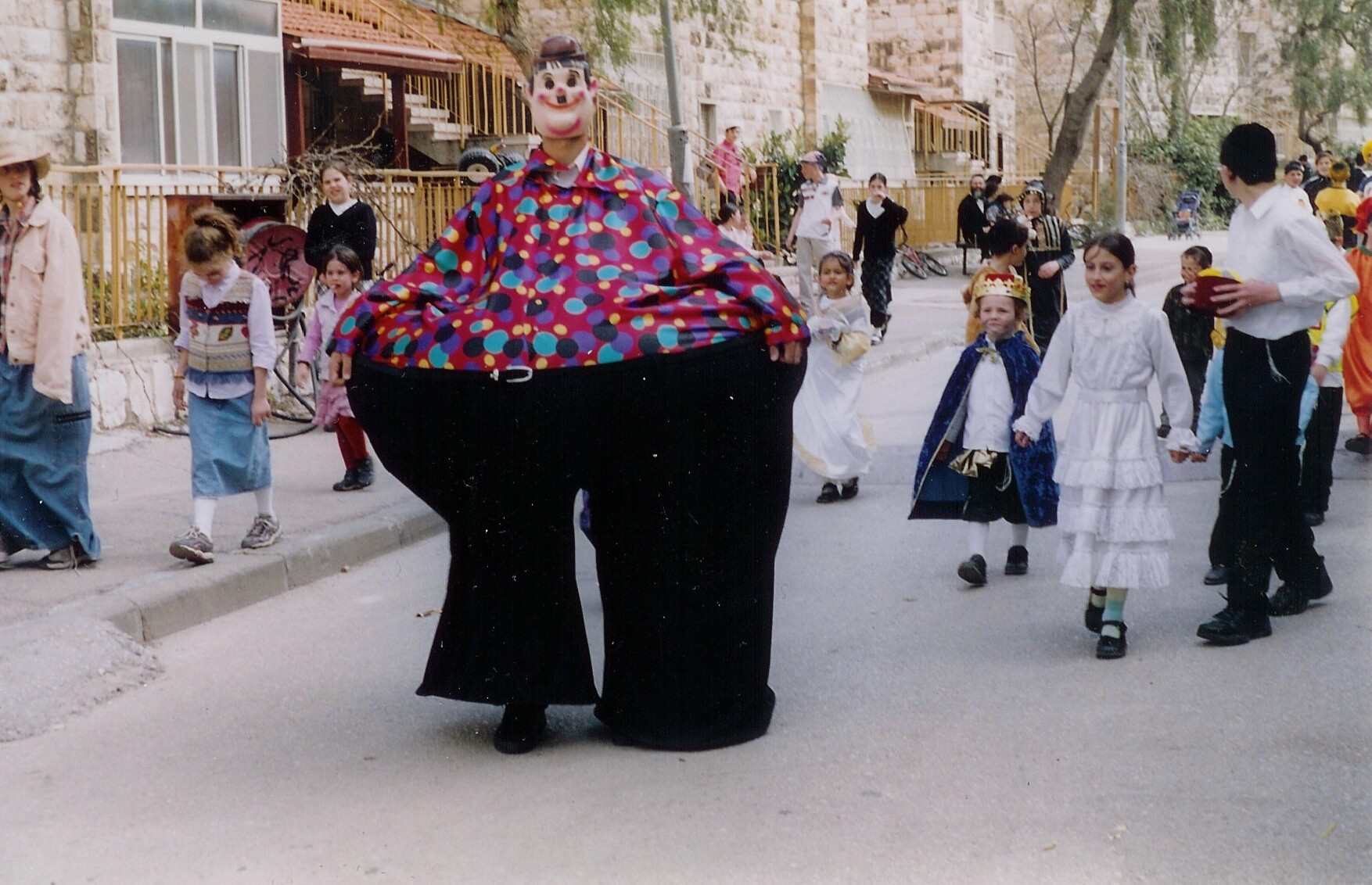
Purim street scene in Jerusalem

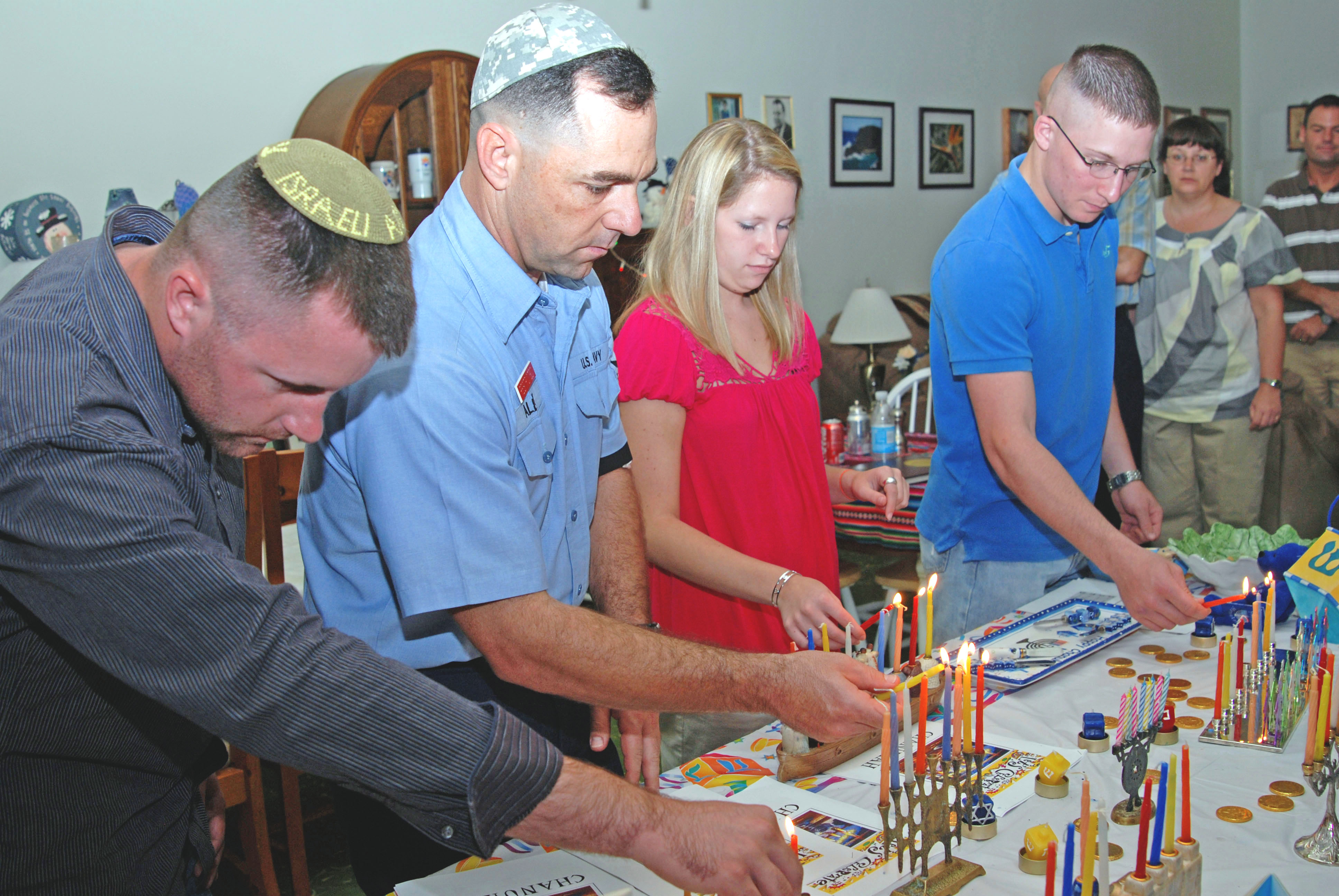
Jewish personnel of the US Navy light candles on Hanukkah

Purim (Hebrew: פורים Pûrîm "lots") is a joyous Jewish holiday that commemorates the deliverance of the Persian Jews from the plot of the evil Haman, who sought to exterminate them, as recorded in the biblical Book of Esther. It is characterized by public recitation of the Book of Esther, mutual gifts of food and drink, charity to the poor, and a celebratory meal (Esther 9:22). Other customs include drinking wine, eating special pastries called hamantashen, dressing up in masks and costumes, and organizing carnivals and parties.

Purim has celebrated annually on the 14th of the Hebrew month of Adar, which occurs in February or March of the Gregorian calendar.

==== Hanukkah ====
Hanukkah (Hebrew: חֲנֻכָּה, "dedication") also known as the Festival of Lights, is an eight-day Jewish holiday that starts on the 25th day of Kislev (Hebrew calendar). The festival is observed in Jewish homes by the kindling of lights on each of the festival's eight nights, one on the first night, two on the second night and so on.

The holiday was called Hanukkah (meaning "dedication") because it marks the re-dedication of the Temple after its desecration by Antiochus IV Epiphanes. Spiritually, Hanukkah commemorates the "Miracle of the Oil". According to the Talmud, at the re-dedication of the Temple in Jerusalem following the victory of the Maccabees over the Seleucid Empire, there was only enough consecrated oil to fuel the eternal flame in the Temple for one day. Miraculously, the oil burned for eight days—which was the length of time it took to press, prepare and consecrate new oil.

Hanukkah is not mentioned in the Bible and was never considered a major holiday in Judaism, but it has become much more visible and widely celebrated in modern times, mainly because it falls around the same time as Christmas and has national Jewish overtones that have been emphasized since the establishment of the State of Israel.

==== Fast days ====
Tisha B'Av (Hebrew: תשעה באב or ט׳ באב, "the Ninth of Av") is a day of mourning and fasting commemorating the destruction of the First and Second Temples, and in later times, the expulsion of the Jews from Spain.

There are three more minor Jewish fast days that commemorate various stages of the destruction of the Temples. They are the 17th Tamuz, the 10th of Tevet and Tzom Gedaliah (the 3rd of Tishrei).

==== Israeli holidays ====
The modern holidays of Yom Ha-shoah (Holocaust Remembrance Day), Yom Hazikaron (Israeli Memorial Day) and Yom Ha'atzmaut (Israeli Independence Day) commemorate the horrors of the Holocaust, the fallen soldiers of Israel and victims of terrorism, and Israeli independence, respectively.

There are some who prefer to commemorate those who were killed in the Holocaust on the 10th of Tevet.

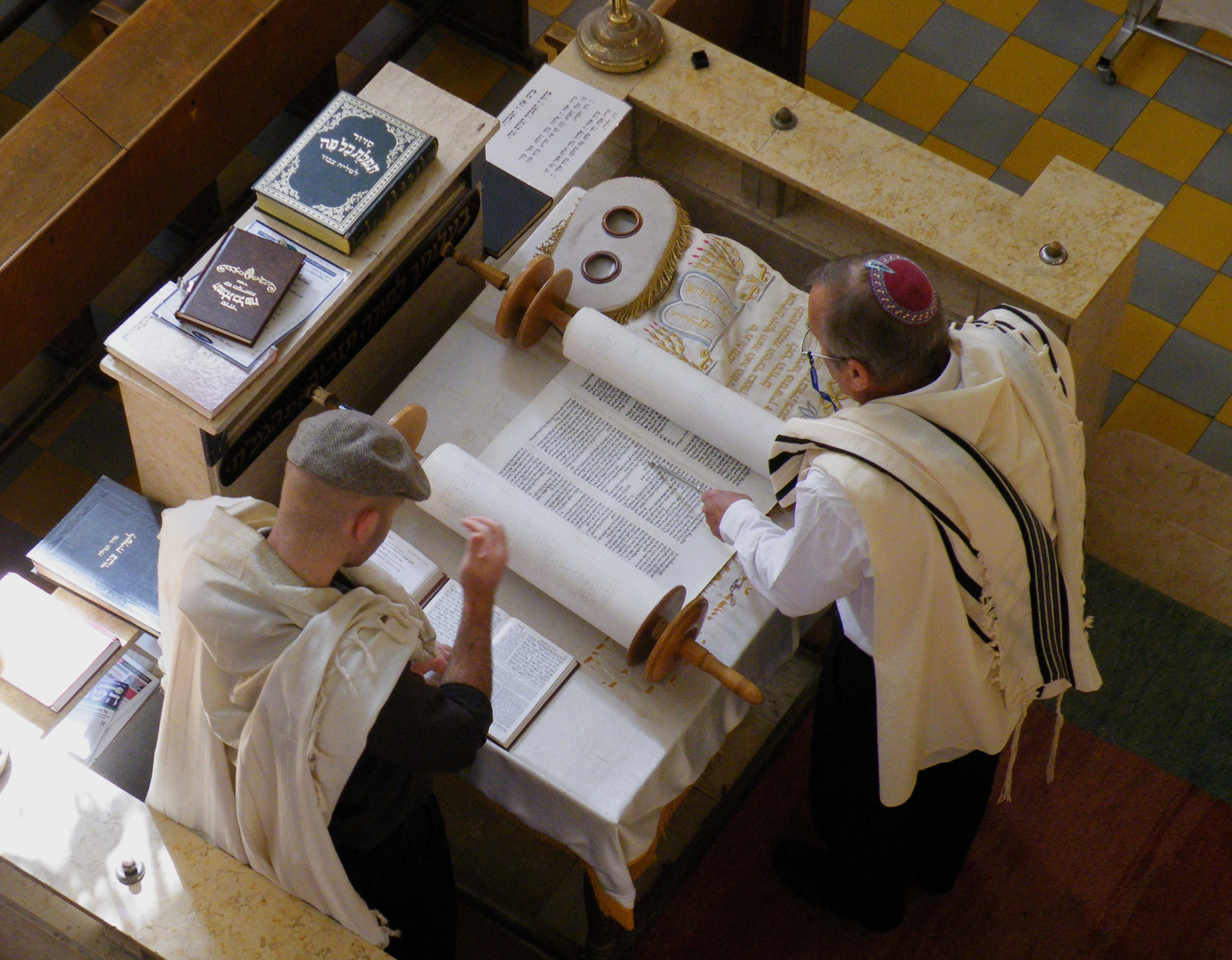
A man reads a torah using a yad

=== Torah readings ===
The core of festival and Shabbat prayer services is the public reading of the Torah, along with connected readings from the other books of the Tanakh, called Haftarah. Over the course of a year, the whole Torah is read, with the cycle starting over in the autumn, on Simchat Torah.

=== Synagogues and religious buildings ===
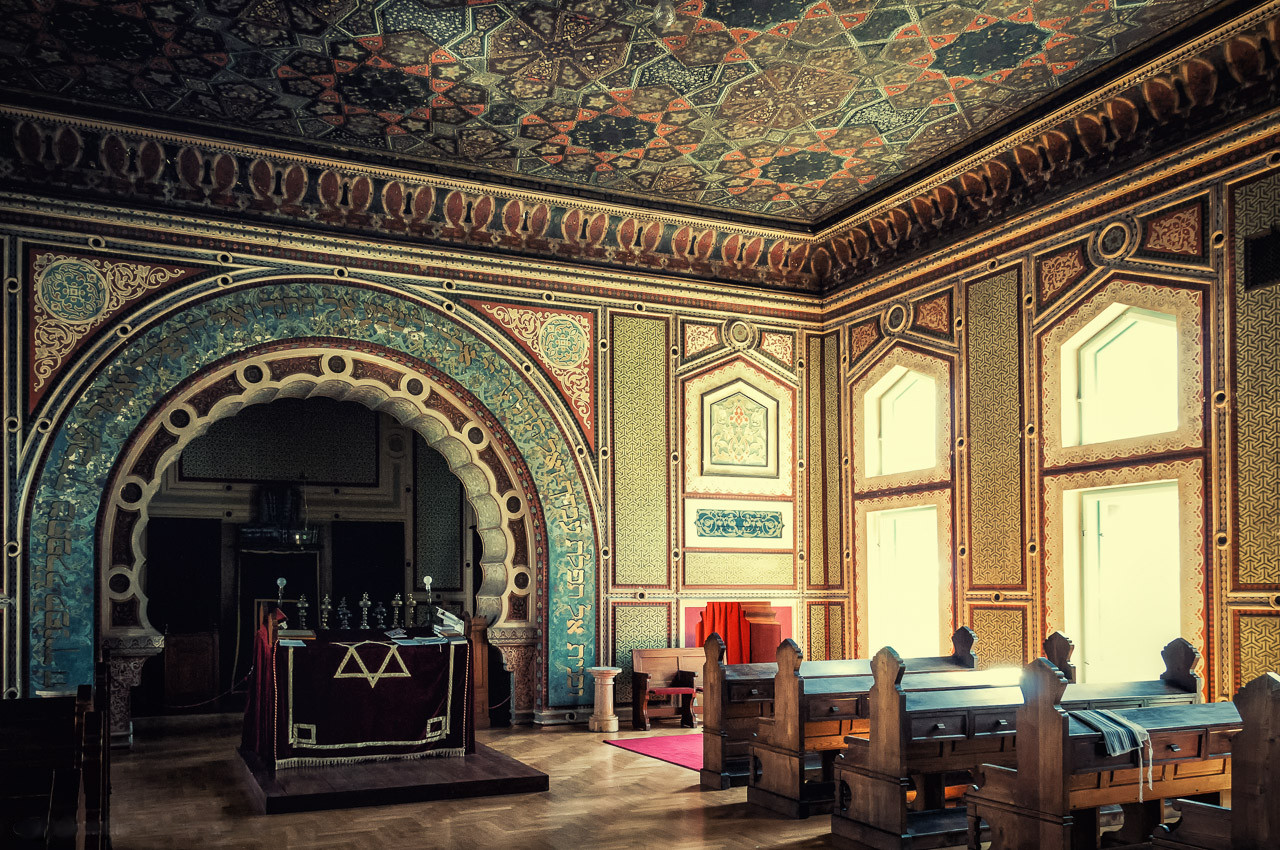
The Sarajevo Synagogue in Sarajevo, Bosnia and Herzegovina

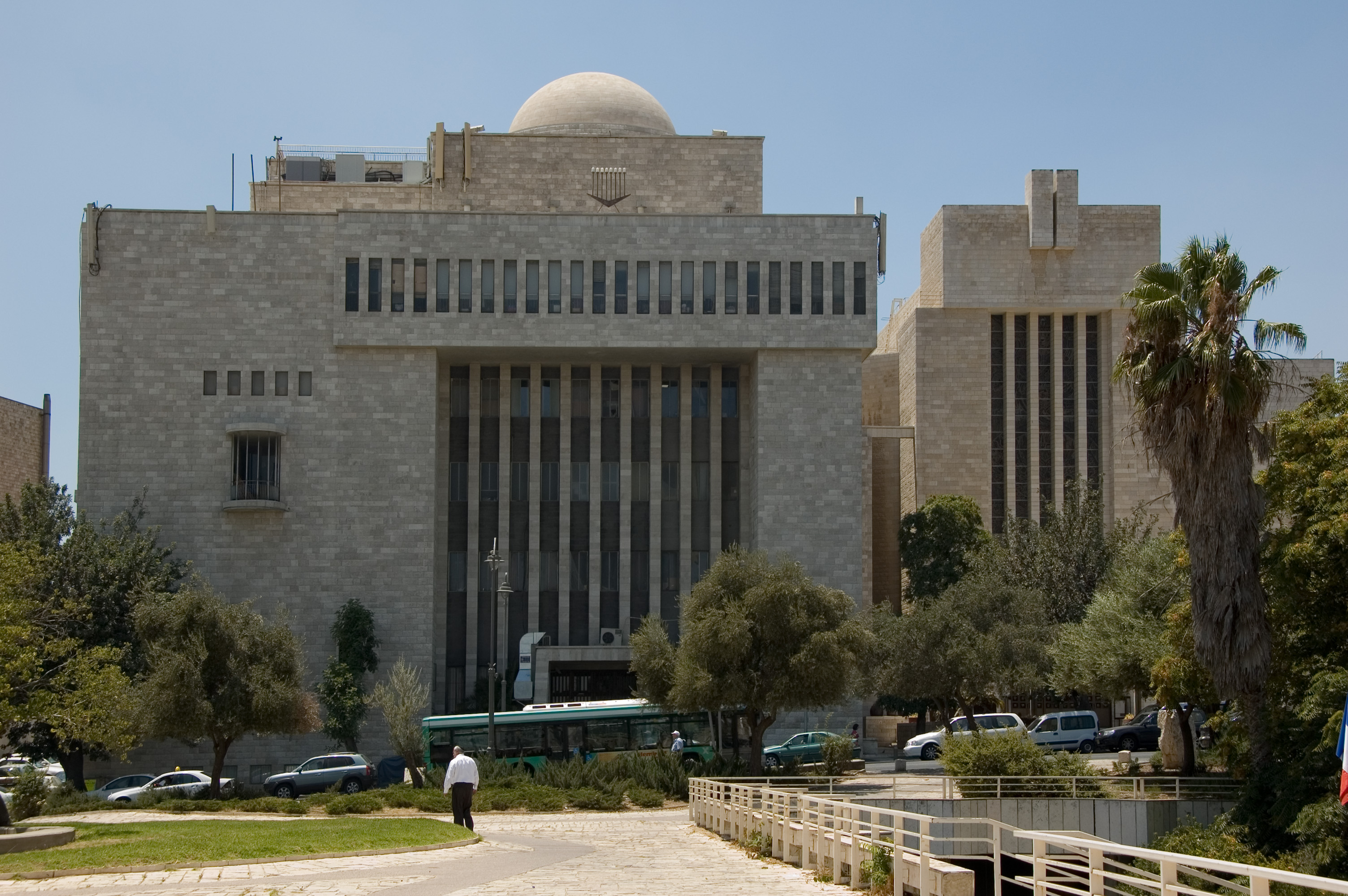
Great Synagogue (Jerusalem)

Synagogues are Jewish houses of prayer and study. They usually contain separate rooms for prayer (the main sanctuary), smaller rooms for study, and often an area for community or educational use. There is no set blueprint for synagogues and the architectural shapes and interior designs of synagogues vary greatly. The Reform movement mostly refer to their synagogues as temples. Some traditional features of a synagogue are:

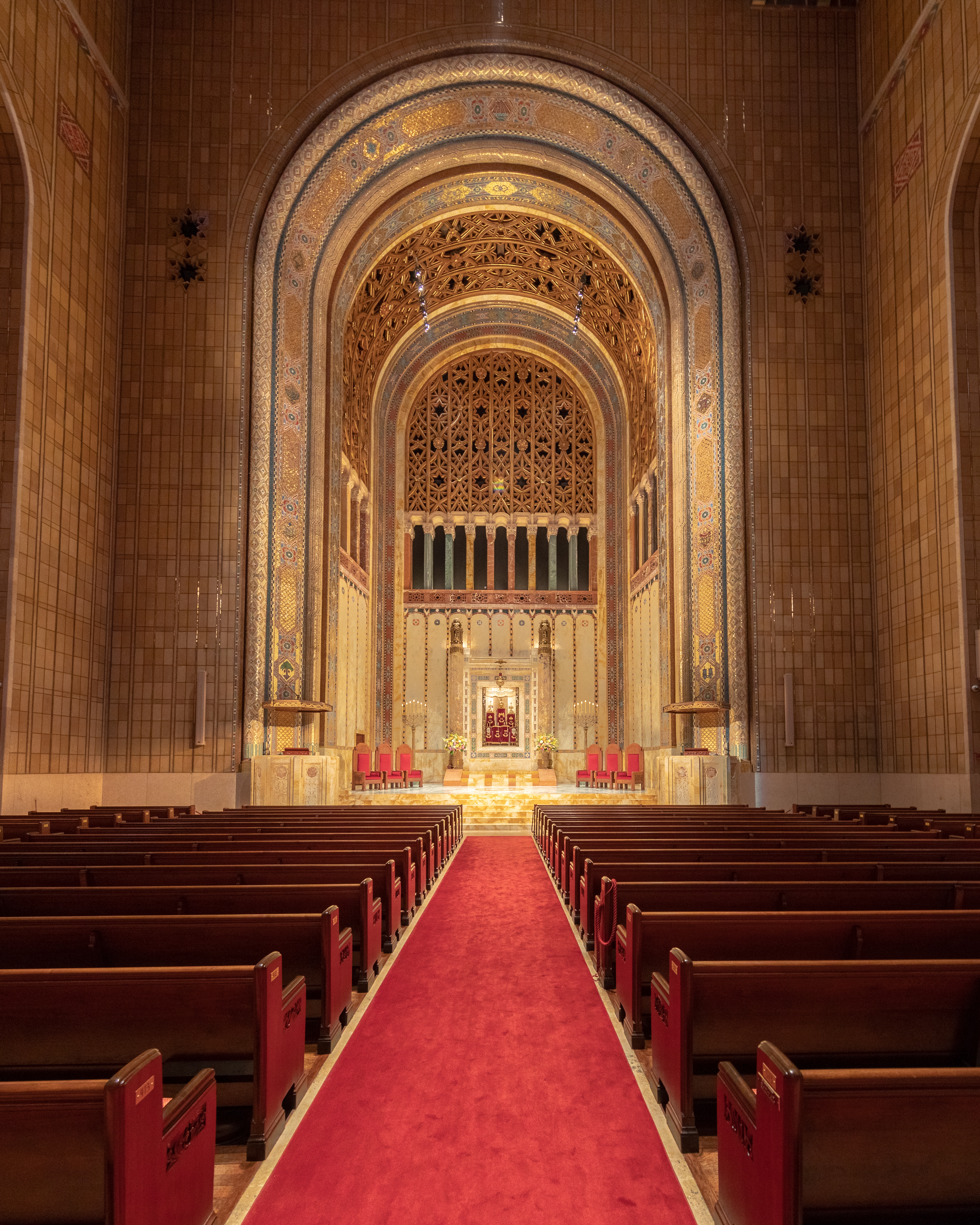
Congregation Emanu-El of New York

- The ark (called aron ha-kodesh by Ashkenazim and hekhal by Sephardim) where the Torah scrolls are kept (the ark is often closed with an ornate curtain (parochet) outside or inside the ark doors);
- The elevated reader's platform (called bimah by Ashkenazim and tebah by Sephardim), where the Torah is read (and services are conducted in Sephardi synagogues);
- The eternal light (ner tamid), a continually lit lamp or lantern used as a reminder of the constantly lit menorah of the Temple in Jerusalem
- The pulpit, or amud, a lectern facing the Ark where the hazzan or prayer leader stands while praying.

In addition to synagogues, other buildings of significance in Judaism include yeshivas, or institutions of Jewish learning, and mikvahs, which are ritual baths.

=== Dietary laws: kashrut ===
The Jewish dietary laws are known as kashrut. Food prepared in accordance with them is termed kosher, and food that is not kosher is also known as treifah or treif. People who observe these laws are colloquially said to be "keeping kosher".

Many of the laws apply to animal-based foods. For example, to be considered kosher, mammals must have split hooves and chew their cud. The pig is arguably the most well-known example of a non-kosher animal. Although it has split hooves, it does not chew its cud. For seafood to be kosher, the animal must have fins and scales. Certain types of seafood, such as shellfish, crustaceans, and eels, are therefore considered non-kosher. Concerning birds, a list of non-kosher species is given in the Torah. The exact translations of many of the species have not survived, and some non-kosher birds' identities are no longer certain. However, traditions exist about the kashrut status of a few birds. For example, both chickens and turkeys are permitted in most communities. Other types of animals, such as amphibians, reptiles, and most insects, are prohibited altogether.

In addition to the requirement that the species be considered kosher, meat and poultry (but not fish) must come from a healthy animal slaughtered in a process known as shechitah. Without the proper slaughtering practices even an otherwise kosher animal will be rendered treif. The slaughtering process is intended to be quick and relatively painless to the animal. Forbidden parts of animals include the blood, some fats, and the area in and around the sciatic nerve.

Halakha also forbids the consumption of meat and dairy products together. The waiting period between eating meat and eating dairy varies by the order in which they are consumed and by community and can extend for up to six hours. Based on the Biblical injunction against cooking a kid in its mother's milk, this rule is mostly derived from the Oral Torah, the Talmud and Rabbinic law. Chicken and other kosher birds are considered the same as meat under the laws of kashrut, but the prohibition is rabbinic, not biblical.

The use of dishes, serving utensils, and ovens may make food treif that would otherwise be kosher. Utensils that have been used to prepare non-kosher food, or dishes that have held meat and are now used for dairy products, render the food treif under certain conditions.

Furthermore, all Orthodox and some Conservative authorities forbid the consumption of processed grape products made by non-Jews, due to ancient pagan practices of using wine in rituals. Some Conservative authorities permit wine and grape juice made without rabbinic supervision.

The Torah does not give specific reasons for most of the laws of kashrut. However, a number of explanations have been offered, including maintaining ritual purity, teaching impulse control, encouraging obedience to God, improving health, reducing cruelty to animals and preserving the distinctness of the Jewish community. The various categories of dietary laws may have developed for different reasons, and some may exist for multiple reasons. For example, people are forbidden from consuming the blood of birds and mammals because, according to the Torah, this is where animal souls are contained. In contrast, the Torah forbids Israelites from eating non-kosher species because "they are unclean". The Kabbalah describes sparks of holiness that are released by the act of eating kosher foods but are too tightly bound in non-kosher foods to be released by eating.

Survival concerns supersede all the laws of kashrut, as they do for most halakhot.

=== Laws of ritual purity ===
The Tanakh describes circumstances in which a person who is tahor or ritually pure may become tamei or ritually impure. Some of these circumstances are contact with human corpses or graves, seminal flux, vaginal flux, menstruation, and contact with people who have become impure from any of these. In Rabbinic Judaism, Kohanim, members of the hereditary caste that served as priests in the time of the Temple, are mostly restricted from entering grave sites and touching dead bodies. During the Temple period, such priests (Kohanim) were required to eat their bread offering (Terumah) in a state of ritual purity, which laws eventually led to more rigid laws being enacted, such as hand-washing which became a requisite of all Jews before consuming ordinary bread.

==== Family purity ====
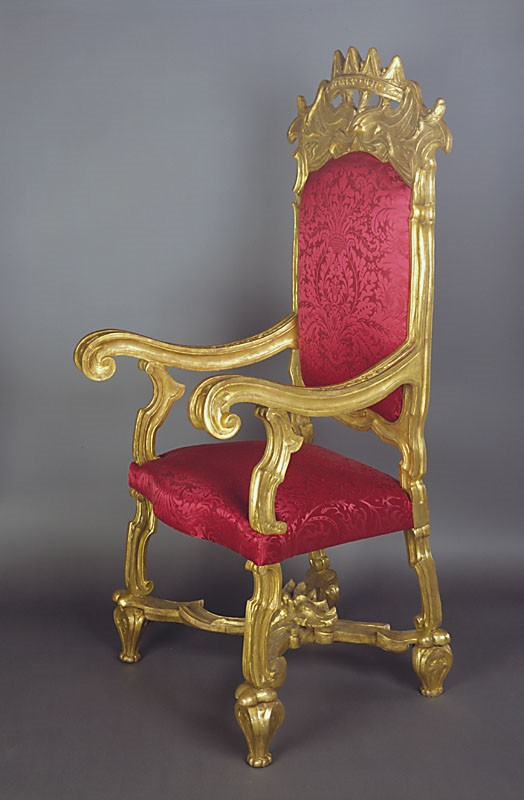
18th-century circumcision chair Museum of Jewish Art and History

An important subcategory of the ritual purity laws relates to the segregation of menstruating women. These laws are also known as niddah, literally "separation", or family purity. Vital aspects of halakha for traditionally observant Jews, they are not usually followed by Jews in liberal denominations.

Especially in Orthodox Judaism, the Biblical laws are augmented by Rabbinical injunctions. For example, the Torah mandates that a woman in her normal menstrual period must abstain from sexual intercourse for seven days. A woman whose menstruation is prolonged must continue to abstain for seven more days after bleeding has stopped. The Rabbis conflated ordinary niddah with this extended menstrual period, known in the Torah as zavah, and mandated that a woman may not have sexual intercourse with her husband from the time she begins her menstrual flow until seven days after it ends. In addition, Rabbinical law forbids the husband from touching or sharing a bed with his wife during this period. Afterwards, purification can occur in a ritual bath called a mikveh

Traditional Ethiopian Jews keep menstruating women in separate huts and, similar to Karaite practice, do not allow menstruating women into their temples because of a temple's special sanctity. Emigration to Israel and the influence of other Jewish denominations have led to Ethiopian Jews adopting more normative Jewish practices.

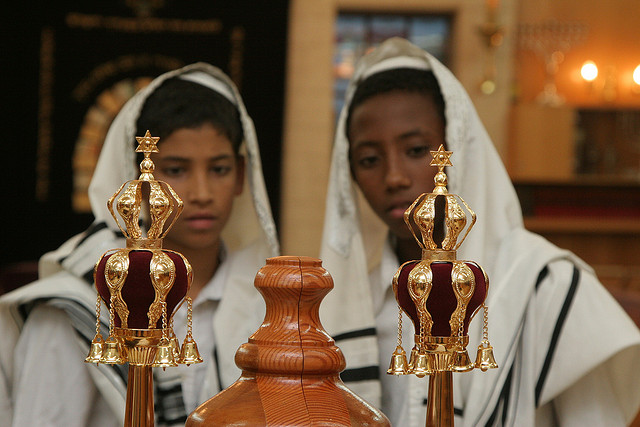
Two boys wearing tallit at a bar mitzvah. The torah is visible in the foreground.

=== Life-cycle events ===
Life-cycle events, or rites of passage, occur throughout a Jew's life that serves to strengthen Jewish identity and bind him/her to the entire community:

- Brit milah – Welcoming male babies into the covenant through the rite of circumcision on their eighth day of life. The baby boy is also given his Hebrew name in the ceremony. A naming ceremony intended as a parallel ritual for girls, named zeved habat or brit bat, enjoys limited popularity.
- Bar mitzvah and Bat mitzvah – This passage from childhood to adulthood takes place when a female Jew is twelve and a male Jew is thirteen years old among Orthodox and some Conservative congregations. In the Reform movement, both girls and boys have their bat/bar mitzvah at age thirteen. This is often commemorated by having the new adults, male only in the Orthodox tradition, lead the congregation in prayer and publicly read a "portion" of the Torah.
- Marriage – Marriage is an extremely important lifecycle event and an ideal human state. A wedding takes place under a chuppah, or wedding canopy, which symbolizes a happy house. At the end of the ceremony, the groom breaks a glass with his foot, symbolizing the continuous mourning for the destruction of the Temple, and the scattering of the Jewish people. An intermarriage is prohibited, except as within Reform Judaism:

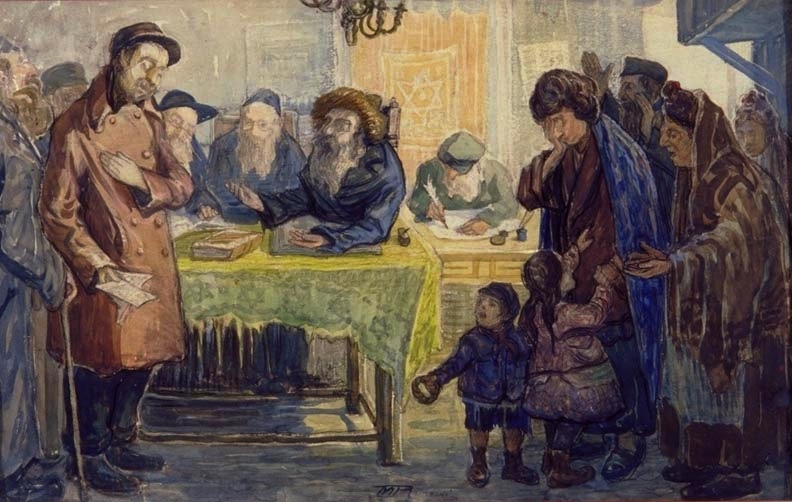
Le Get (The Divorce) by Moshe Rynecki, c. 1930

- Divorce – Divorce is allowed in accordance with Halakha. The divorce ceremony involves the husband giving the short get document written in Aramaic into the hand of the wife in rabbinical court, that is all. But, since the 11th century among the Ashkenazim and many Sephardim a divorce became prohibited against will of a wife, than a man had way for polygamy. The get contains declaration: "You are hereby permitted to all men."

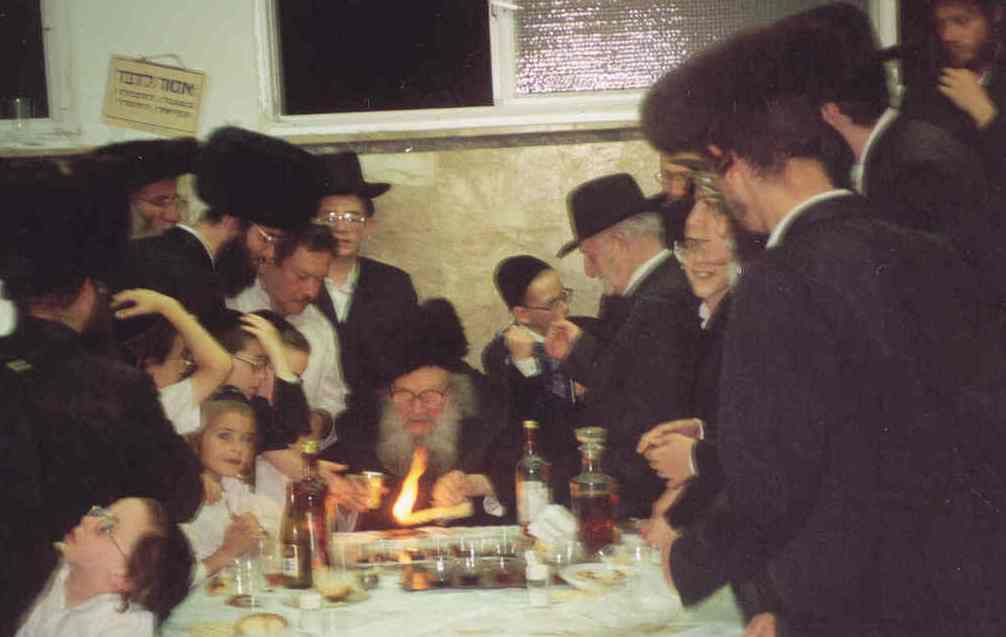
The Bereavement (Yahrtzeit) Hasidic tish, Bnei Brak, Israel

- Death and Mourning (Avelut) – The Torah requires burial as soon as possible, even for executed criminals. Judaism has a multi-staged mourning practice. The first stage is called the shiva (literally "seven", observed for one week) during which it is traditional to sit at home and be comforted by friends and family, the second is the shloshim (observed for one month) and for those who have lost one of their parents, there is a third stage, avelut yud bet chodesh, which is observed for eleven months. A cremation within Orthodox Judaism permitted only by some leading rabbis in West Europe.

== Community leadership ==
=== Classical priesthood ===
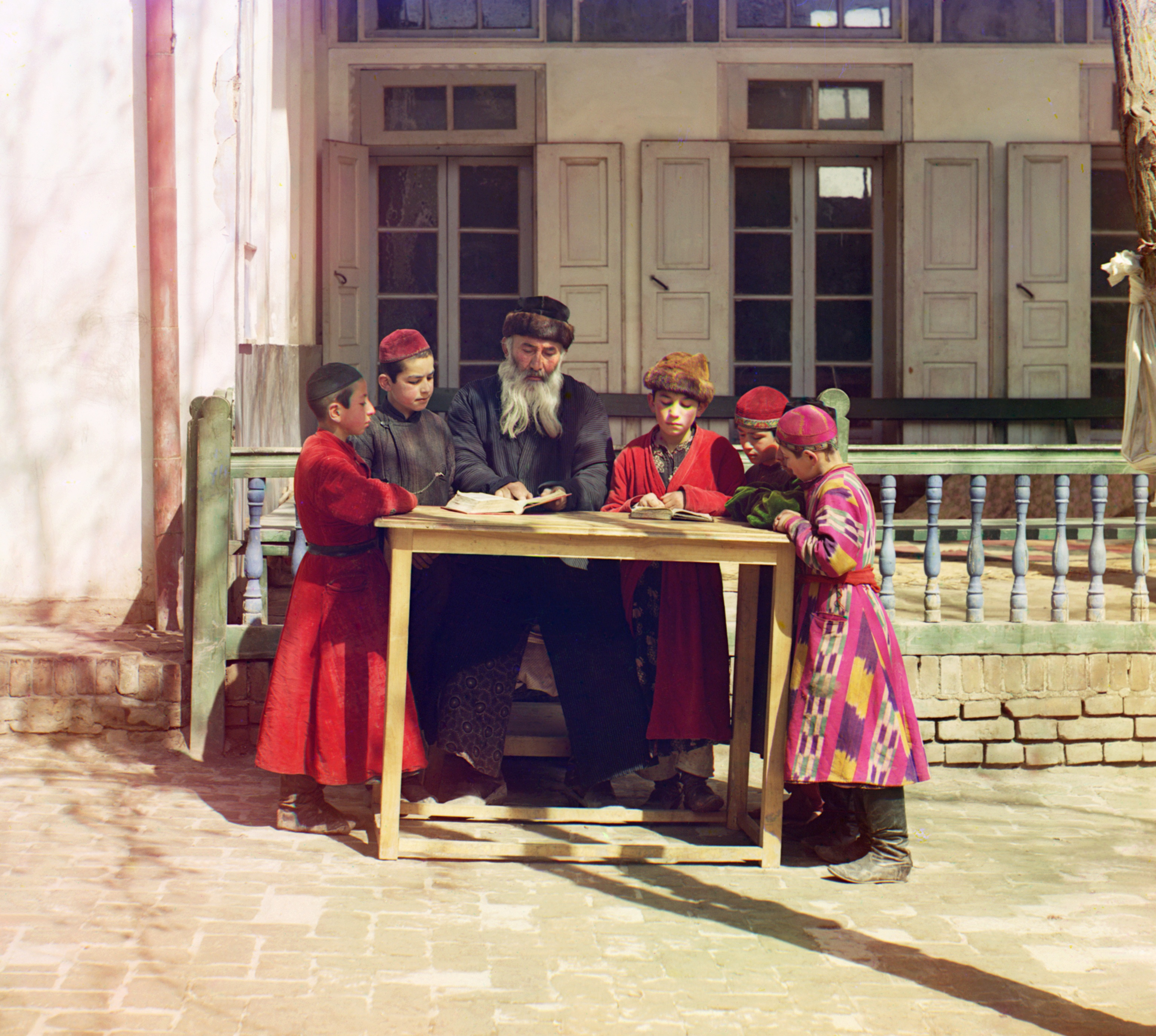
Jewish students with their teacher in Samarkand, Uzbekistan c. 1910.

The role of the priesthood in Judaism has significantly diminished since the destruction of the Second Temple in 70 CE when priests attended to the Temple and sacrifices. The priesthood is an inherited position, and although priests no longer have any but ceremonial duties, they are still honoured in many Jewish communities. Many Orthodox Jewish communities believe that they will be needed again for a future Third Temple and need to remain in readiness for future duty:

- Kohen (priest) – patrilineal descendant of Aaron, brother of Moses. In the Temple, the kohanim were charged with performing the sacrifices. Today, a Kohen is the first one called up at the reading of the Torah, performs the Priestly Blessing, as well as complying with other unique laws and ceremonies, including the ceremony of redemption of the first-born.
- Levi (Levite) – Patrilineal descendant of Levi the son of Jacob. In the Temple in Jerusalem, the levites sang Psalms, performed construction, maintenance, janitorial, and guard duties, assisted the priests, and sometimes interpreted the law and Temple ritual to the public. Today, a Levite is called up second to the reading of the Torah.

=== Prayer leaders ===
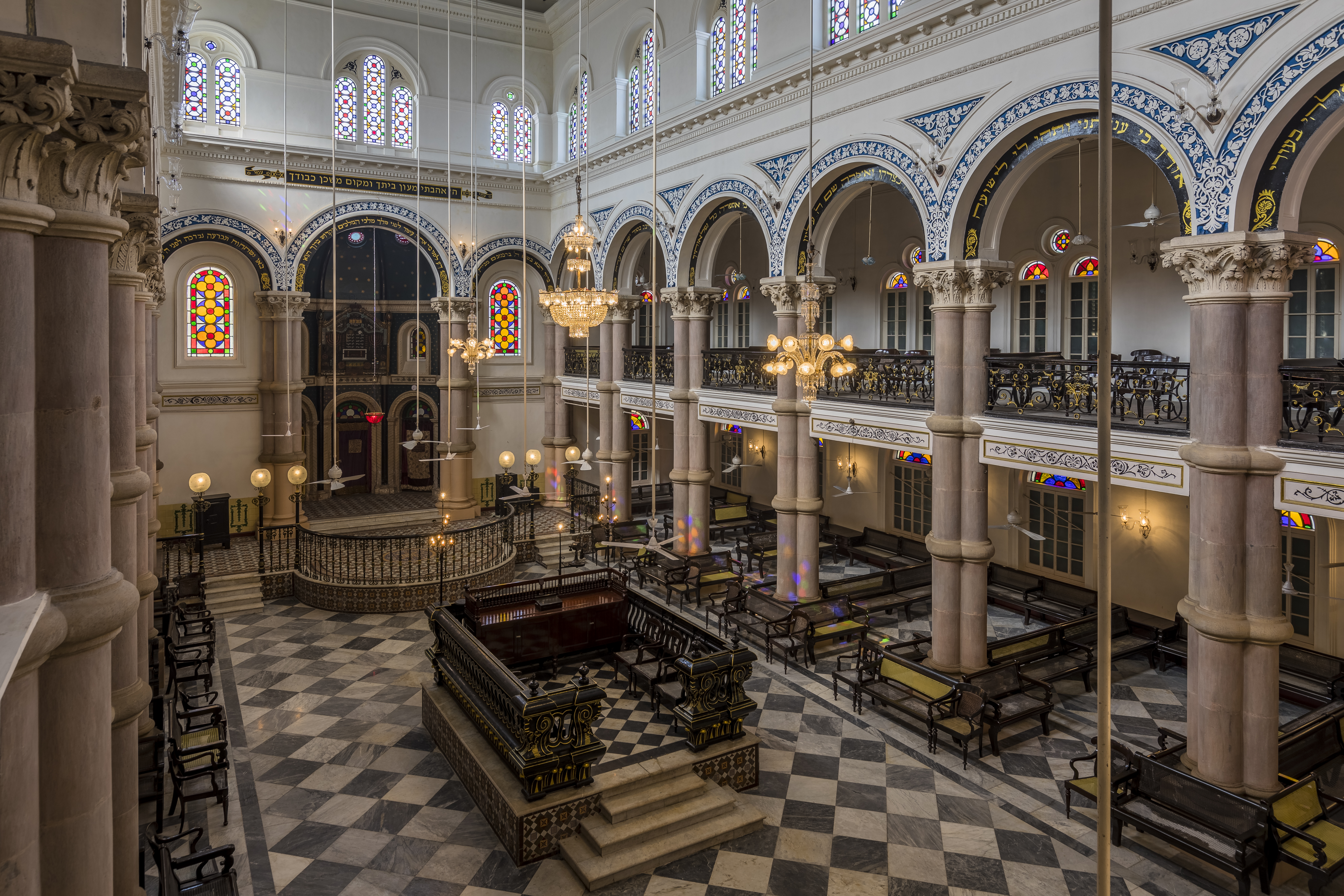
Magen David Synagogue in Kolkata, India

From the time of the Mishnah and Talmud to the present, Judaism has required specialists or authorities for the practice of very few rituals or ceremonies. A Jew can fulfill most requirements for prayer by himself. Some activities—reading the Torah and haftarah (a supplementary portion from the Prophets or Writings), the prayer for mourners, the blessings for bridegroom and bride, the complete grace after meals—require a minyan, the presence of ten Jews.

The most common professional clergy in a synagogue are:

- Rabbi of a congregation – Jewish scholar who is charged with answering the legal questions of a congregation. This role requires ordination by the congregation's preferred authority (i.e., from a respected Orthodox rabbi or, if the congregation is Conservative or Reform, from academic seminaries). A congregation does not necessarily require a rabbi. Some congregations have a rabbi but also allow members of the congregation to act as shatz or baal kriyah (see below).
  - Hassidic Rebbe – rabbi who is the head of a Hasidic dynasty.
- Hazzan (note: the "h" denotes voiceless pharyngeal fricative) (cantor) – a trained vocalist who acts as shatz. Chosen for a good voice, knowledge of traditional tunes, understanding of the meaning of the prayers and sincerity in reciting them. A congregation does not need to have a dedicated hazzan.

Jewish prayer services do involve two specified roles, which are sometimes, but not always, filled by a rabbi or hazzan in many congregations. In other congregations these roles are filled on an ad-hoc basis by members of the congregation who lead portions of services on a rotating basis:

- Shaliach tzibur or Shatz (leader—literally "agent" or "representative"—of the congregation) leads those assembled in prayer and sometimes prays on behalf of the community. When a shatz recites a prayer on behalf of the congregation, he is not acting as an intermediary but rather as a facilitator. The entire congregation participates in the recital of such prayers by saying amen at their conclusion; it is with this act that the shatz's prayer becomes the prayer of the congregation. Any adult capable of reciting the prayers clearly may act as shatz. In Orthodox congregations and some Conservative congregations, only men can be prayer leaders, but all Progressive communities now allow women to serve in this function.
- The Baal kriyah or baal koreh (master of the reading) reads the weekly Torah portion. The requirements for being the baal kriyah are the same as those for the shatz. These roles are not mutually exclusive. The same person is often qualified to fill more than one role and often does. Often there are several people capable of filling these roles and different services (or parts of services) will be led by each.

Many congregations, especially larger ones, also rely on a:

- Gabbai (sexton) – Calls people up to the Torah, appoints the shatz for each prayer session if there is no standard shatz, and makes certain that the synagogue is kept clean and supplied.

The three preceding positions are usually voluntary and considered an honour. Since the Enlightenment large synagogues have often adopted the practice of hiring rabbis and hazzans to act as shatz and baal kriyah, and this is still typically the case in many Conservative and Reform congregations. However, in most Orthodox synagogues these positions are filled by laypeople on a rotating or ad-hoc basis. Although most congregations hire one or more Rabbis, the use of a professional hazzan is generally declining in American congregations, and the use of professionals for other offices is rarer still.

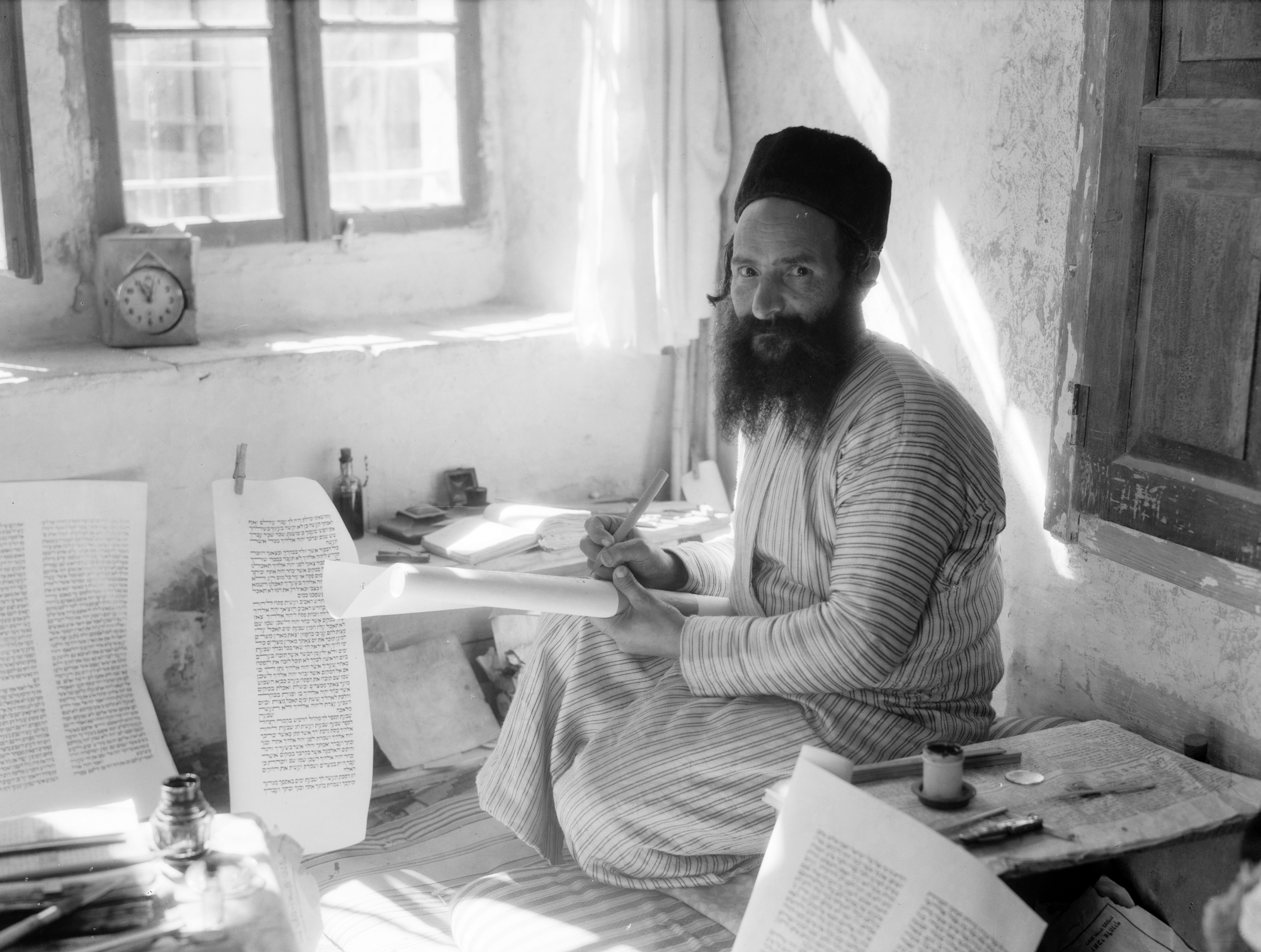
A Yemeni sofer writing a torah in the 1930s

=== Specialized religious roles ===
- Dayan (judge) – An ordained rabbi with special legal training who belongs to a beth din (rabbinical court). In Israel, religious courts handle marriage and divorce cases, conversion and financial disputes in the Jewish community.
- Mohel (circumciser) – An expert in the laws of circumcision who has received training from a previously qualified mohel and performs the brit milah (circumcision).
- Shochet (ritual slaughterer) – For meat to be kosher, it must be slaughtered by a shochet who is an expert in the laws of kashrut and has been trained by another shochet.
- Sofer (scribe) – Torah scrolls, tefillin (phylacteries), mezuzot (scrolls put on doorposts), and gittin (bills of divorce) must be written by a sofer who is an expert in Hebrew calligraphy and has undergone rigorous training in the laws of writing sacred texts.
- Rosh yeshiva – A Torah scholar who runs a yeshiva.
- Mashgiach/Mashgicha of a yeshiva – Depending on which yeshiva, might either be the person responsible for ensuring attendance and proper conduct, or even supervise the emotional and spiritual welfare of the students and give lectures on mussar (Jewish ethics).
- Mashgiach/Mashgicha – Supervises manufacturers of kosher food, importers, caterers and restaurants to ensure that the food is kosher. Must be an expert in the laws of kashrut and trained by a rabbi, if not a rabbi himself or herself.

=== Historical Jewish groupings (to 1700) ===
Around the 1st century CE, there were several small Jewish sects: the Pharisees, Sadducees, Zealots, Essenes, and Christians. After the destruction of the Second Temple in 70 CE, these sects vanished. Christianity survived, but by breaking with Judaism and becoming a separate religion; the Pharisees survived but in the form of Rabbinic Judaism (today, known simply as "Judaism"). The Sadducees rejected the divine inspiration of the Prophets and the Writings, relying only on the Torah as divinely inspired. Consequently, a number of other core tenets of the Pharisees' belief system (which became the basis for modern Judaism), were also dismissed by the Sadducees. (The Samaritans practiced a similar religion, which is traditionally considered separate from Judaism.)

Like the Sadducees who relied only on the Torah, some Jews in the 8th and 9th centuries rejected the authority and divine inspiration of the oral law as recorded in the Mishnah (and developed by later rabbis in the two Talmuds), relying instead only upon the Tanakh. These included the Isunians, the Yudganites, the Malikites, and others. They soon developed oral traditions of their own, which differed from the rabbinic traditions, and eventually formed the Karaite sect. Karaites exist in small numbers today, mostly living in Israel. Rabbinical and Karaite Jews each hold that the others are Jews, but that the other faith is erroneous.

Over a long time, Jews formed distinct ethnic groups in several different geographic areas—amongst others, the Ashkenazi Jews (of central and Eastern Europe), the Sephardi Jews (of Spain, Portugal, and North Africa), the Beta Israel of Ethiopia, the Yemenite Jews from the southern tip of the Arabian Peninsula, and the Malabari and Cochin Jews from Kerala. Many of these groups have developed differences in their prayers, traditions and accepted canons; however, these distinctions are mainly the result of their being formed at some cultural distance from normative (rabbinic) Judaism, rather than based on any doctrinal dispute.

=== Persecutions ===
Antisemitism arose during the Middle Ages, in the form of persecutions, pogroms, forced conversions, expulsions, social restrictions and ghettoization.

This was different in quality from the repressions of Jews which had occurred in ancient times. Ancient repressions were politically motivated and Jews were treated the same as members of other ethnic groups. With the rise of the Churches, the main motive for attacks on Jews changed from politics to religion and the religious motive for such attacks was specifically derived from Christian views about Jews and Judaism. During the Middle Ages, Jewish people who lived under Muslim rule generally experienced tolerance and integration, but there were occasional outbreaks of violence like Almohad's persecutions.

=== Hasidism ===
Hasidic Judaism was founded by Yisroel ben Eliezer (1700–1760), also known as the Ba'al Shem Tov (or Besht). It originated in a time of persecution of the Jewish people when European Jews had turned inward to Talmud study; many felt that most expressions of Jewish life had become too "academic", and that they no longer had any emphasis on spirituality or joy. Its adherents favoured small and informal gatherings called Shtiebel, which, in contrast to a traditional synagogue, could be used both as a place of worship and for celebrations involving dancing, eating, and socializing. Ba'al Shem Tov's disciples attracted many followers; they themselves established numerous Hasidic sects across Europe. Unlike other religions, which typically expanded through word of mouth or by use of print, Hasidism spread largely owing to Tzadiks, who used their influence to encourage others to follow the movement. Hasidism appealed to many Europeans because it was easy to learn, did not require full immediate commitment, and presented a compelling spectacle. Hasidic Judaism eventually became the way of life for many Jews in Eastern Europe. Waves of Jewish immigration in the 1880s carried it to the United States. The movement itself claims to be nothing new, but a refreshment of original Judaism. As some have put it: "they merely re-emphasized that which the generations had lost". Nevertheless, early on there was a serious schism between Hasidic and non-Hasidic Jews. European Jews who rejected the Hasidic movement were dubbed by the Hasidim as Misnagdim, (lit. 'opponents'). Some of the reasons for the rejection of Hasidic Judaism were the exuberance of Hasidic worship, its deviation from tradition in ascribing infallibility and miracles to their leaders, and the concern that it might become a messianic sect. Over time differences between the Hasidim and their opponents have slowly diminished and both groups are now considered part of Haredi Judaism.

=== The Enlightenment and new religious movements ===
In the late 18th century CE, Europe was swept by a group of intellectual, social and political movements known as the Enlightenment. The Enlightenment led to reductions in the European laws that prohibited Jews to interact with the wider secular world, thus allowing Jews access to secular education and experience. A parallel Jewish movement, Haskalah or the "Jewish Enlightenment", began, especially in Central Europe and Western Europe, in response to both the Enlightenment and these new freedoms. It placed an emphasis on integration with secular society and a pursuit of non-religious knowledge through reason. With the promise of political emancipation, many Jews saw no reason to continue to observe halakha and increasing numbers of Jews assimilated into Christian Europe. Modern religious movements of Judaism all formed in reaction to this trend.

In Central Europe, followed by Great Britain and the United States, Reform (or Liberal) Judaism developed, relaxing legal obligations (especially those that limited Jewish relations with non-Jews), emulating Protestant decorum in prayer, and emphasizing the ethical values of Judaism's Prophetic tradition. Modern Orthodox Judaism developed in reaction to Reform Judaism, by leaders who argued that Jews could participate in public life as citizens equal to Christians while maintaining the observance of halakha. Meanwhile, in the United States, wealthy Reform Jews helped European scholars, who were Orthodox in practice but critical (and skeptical) in their study of the Bible and Talmud, to establish a seminary to train rabbis for immigrants from Eastern Europe. These left-wing Orthodox rabbis were joined by right-wing Reform rabbis who felt that halakha should not be entirely abandoned, to form the Conservative movement. Orthodox Jews who opposed the Haskalah formed Haredi Orthodox Judaism. After massive movements of Jews following The Holocaust and the creation of the state of Israel, these movements have competed for followers from among traditional Jews in or from other countries.

=== Spectrum of observance ===
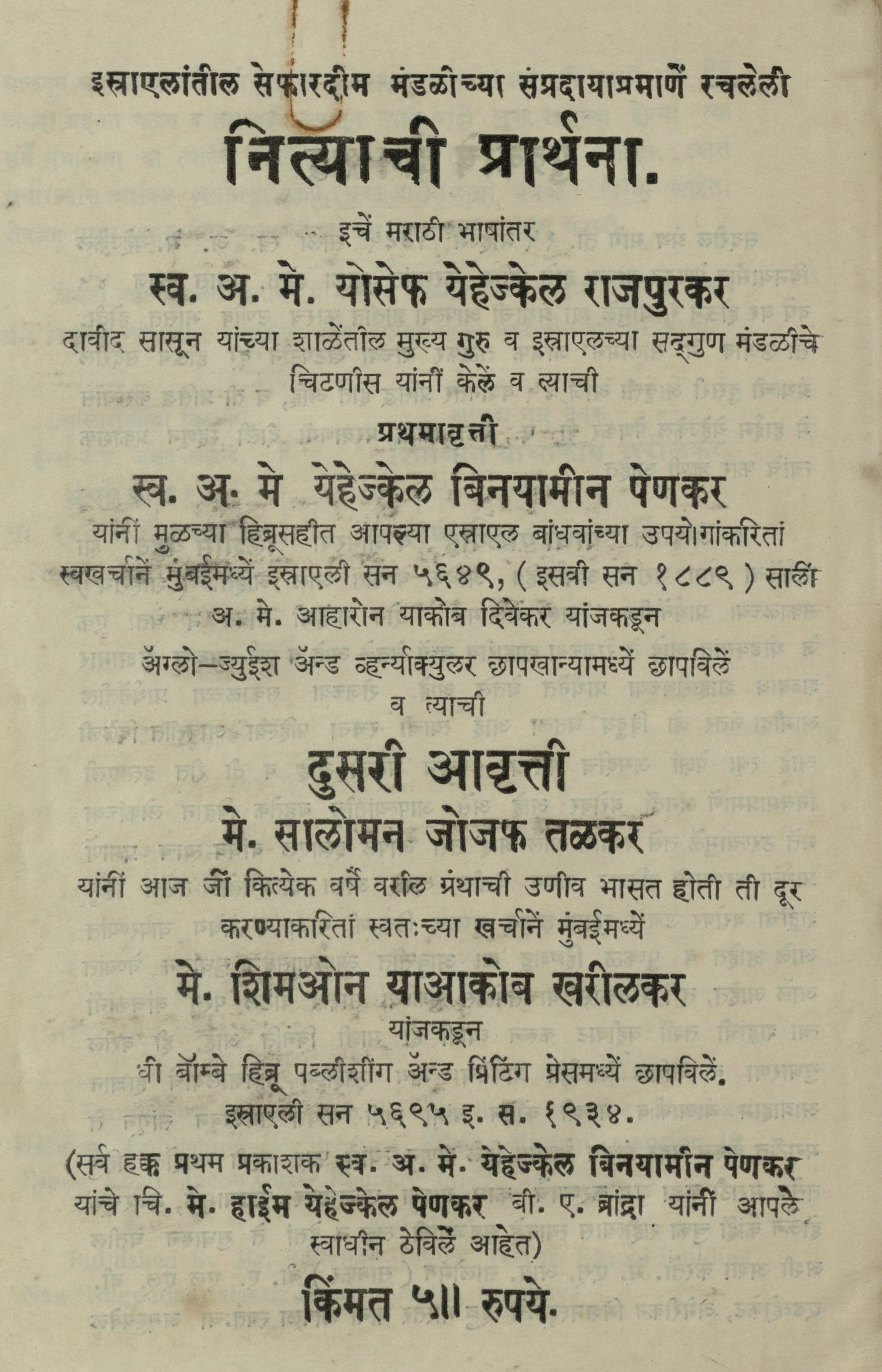
1889 siddur published in Hebrew and Marathi for use by the Bene Israel community

Jewish religious practice varies widely through all levels of observance. According to the 2001 edition of the National Jewish Population Survey, in the United States' Jewish community—the world's second largest—4.3 million Jews out of 5.1 million had some sort of connection to the religion. Of that population of connected Jews, 80% participated in some sort of Jewish religious observance, but only 48% belonged to a congregation, and fewer than 16% attend regularly.

== Judaism and ecology ==
Ecological concerns are deeply rooted in the Jewish tradition. The natural world plays a central role in Jewish law, literature, liturgy, and other practices. In Jewish law (halakhah), ecological concerns are reflected in several instances. These include, the Biblical protection for fruit trees, rules in the Mishnah against harming the public domain, Talmudic debate over noise and smoke damages, and contemporary responsa on agricultural pollution. The rule of tza'ar ba'alei hayyim is a restriction on cruelty to animals.

Although the Bible and rabbinic tradition have put Judaism on an anthropocentric path, creation-centered or eco-centric interpretations of Judaism can also be found throughout Jewish history. Many theologians regard the land as a primary partner of Jewish covenant, and Judaism, especially the practices described in the Torah, may be regarded as the expression of a fully indigenous, earth-centered tradition.

Since the 1970s, hundreds of articles and books have been written on the topic of Judaism and environmentalism, and the moral obligation to care for God's Earth and its creatures. The article "Judaism and the Ecological Crisis" and Dr. Eilon Schwartz's "Bal Tashchit: A Jewish Environmental Precept" note about the Jewish concept of Bal Tashchit, which prohibits unnecessary waste and encourages the sustainable use of resources. Dr. Hava Tirosh-Samuelson, in a 2001 essay titled "Nature in the Sources of Judaism", notes how a Jewish perspective on nature is rooted in the belief that the universe is the creation of God.

Scores of books have been published on Jewish teachings and environmental stewardship. Among them are "Eco Bible: Volume 1: An Ecological Commentary on Genesis and Exodus", and "Eco Bible: Volume 2: An Ecological Commentary on Leviticus, Numbers, and Deuteronomy".

== Judaism and other religions ==
=== Christianity and Judaism ===
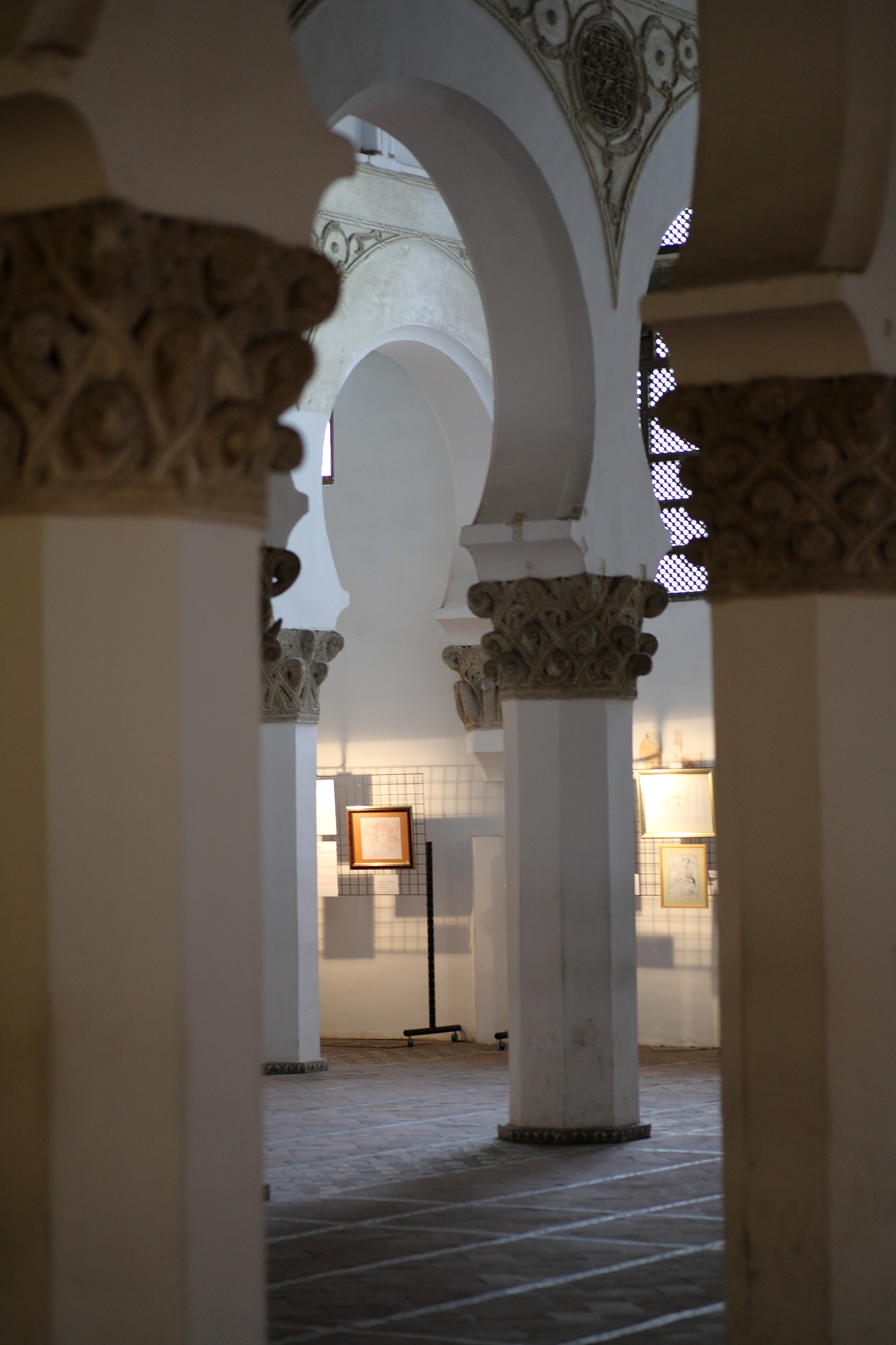
The 12th-century Synagogue of Santa María la Blanca in Toledo, Spain, was converted to a church shortly after anti-Jewish pogroms in 1391

Christianity was originally a sect of Second Temple Judaism, but the two religions diverged in the first century. The differences between Christianity and Judaism originally centered on whether Jesus was the Jewish Messiah, but eventually became irreconcilable. Major differences between the two faiths include the nature of the Messiah, of atonement and sin, the status of God's commandments to Israel, and perhaps most significantly, of the nature of God himself. Due to these differences, Judaism traditionally regards Christianity as shituf (שִׁתּוּף, 'association'), or worship of the God of Israel in an incompletely monotheistic manner (e.g., deifying Jesus in addition to the one God). Christianity has traditionally regarded Judaism as obsolete with the invention of Christianity and Jews as a people replaced by the Church. However, a Christian belief in dual-covenant theology emerged as a phenomenon following Christian reflection on how the religion's theology influenced the Holocaust and Nazism.

Since the time of the Middle Ages, the Catholic Church upheld the Constitutio pro Judæis (Formal Statement on the Jews), which stated:

We decree that no Christian shall use violence to force them to be baptized, so long as they are unwilling and refuse.…Without the judgment of the political authority of the land, no Christian shall presume to wound them or kill them or rob them of their money or change the good customs that they have thus far enjoyed in the place where they live."

Until Jewish emancipation in the late 18th and the 19th century, Jews in Christian lands were subject to humiliating legal restrictions and limitations. They included provisions requiring Jews to wear specific and identifying clothing such as the Jewish hat and the yellow badge, restricting Jews to certain cities and towns or in certain parts of towns (ghettos), and forbidding Jews to enter certain trades (e.g., selling new clothes in medieval Sweden). Disabilities also included special taxes levied on Jews, exclusion from public life, restraints on the performance of religious ceremonies, and linguistic censorship. Some countries went even further and completely expelled Jews—for example, the English Edict of Expulsion in 1290 (Jews were readmitted in 1655) and expulsion of the Jews from Spain in 1492 (who were readmitted in 1868). The first Jewish settlers in North America arrived in the Dutch colony of New Amsterdam in 1654; they were forbidden to hold public office, open a retail shop, or establish a synagogue. When the colony was seized by the British in 1664, Jewish rights remained unchanged; by 1671, Asser Levy was the first Jew to serve on a jury in North America. In 1791, Revolutionary France was the first country to abolish disabilities altogether, followed by Prussia in 1848. Emancipation of the Jews in the United Kingdom was achieved in 1858 after an almost 30-year struggle championed by Isaac Lyon Goldsmid, with Jews given the right to sit in parliament with the passing of the Jews Relief Act 1858. The newly created German Empire in 1871 abolished Jewish disabilities in Germany, which were reinstated in the Nuremberg Laws in 1935.

Jewish life in Christian lands was marred by blood libels, expulsions, forced conversions, and massacres. Religious prejudice fueled hostility against Jews in Europe. Christian rhetoric and antipathy towards Jews developed in the early years of Christianity and was reinforced by ever-increasing anti-Jewish measures over the ensuing centuries. The action taken by Christians against Jews included acts of violence and murder, culminating in the Holocaust. These attitudes were reinforced by Christian preaching, in art and popular teaching for two millennia which expressed contempt for Jews, as well as statutes which were designed to humiliate and stigmatise Jews, such as those of the Judensau motif. The Nazi Party was known for its persecution of Christian churches; many of them, such as the Protestant Confessing Church and the Catholic Church, as well as Quakers and Jehovah's Witnesses, aided and rescued Jews who were being targeted by the antireligious régime.

The attitude of Christians and Christian churches toward the Jewish people and Judaism has changed in a mostly positive direction since World War II. Pope John Paul II and the Catholic Church have "upheld the Church's acceptance of the continuing and permanent election of the Jewish people" as well as a reaffirmation of the covenant between God and the Jews. In December 2015, the Vatican released a 10,000-word document that, among other things, stated that Catholics should work with Jews to fight antisemitism.

In continental Europe, Judaism is heavily associated with and most often thought of as Orthodox Judaism.

=== Islam and Judaism ===
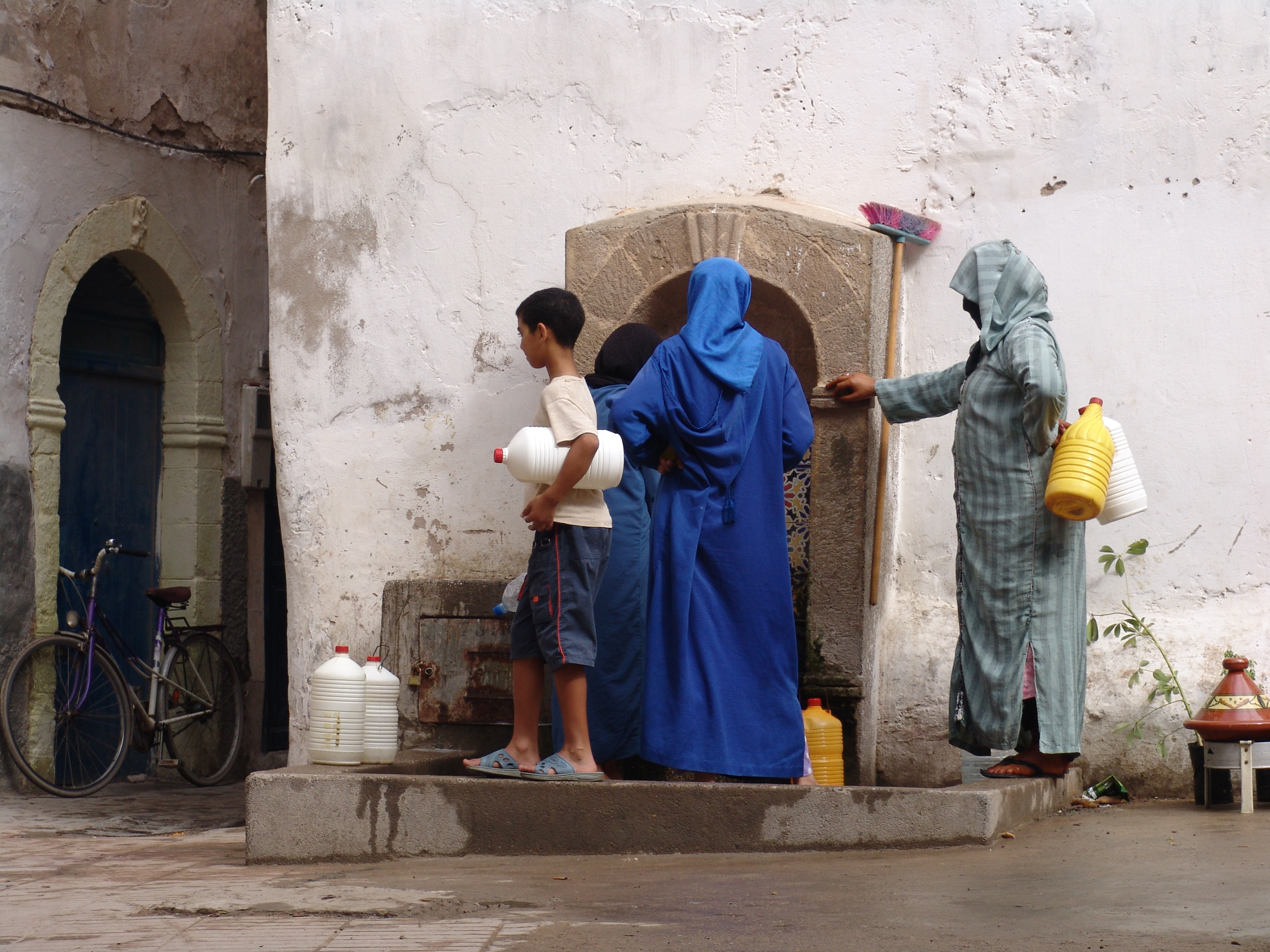
Muslim women in the mellah of Essaouira

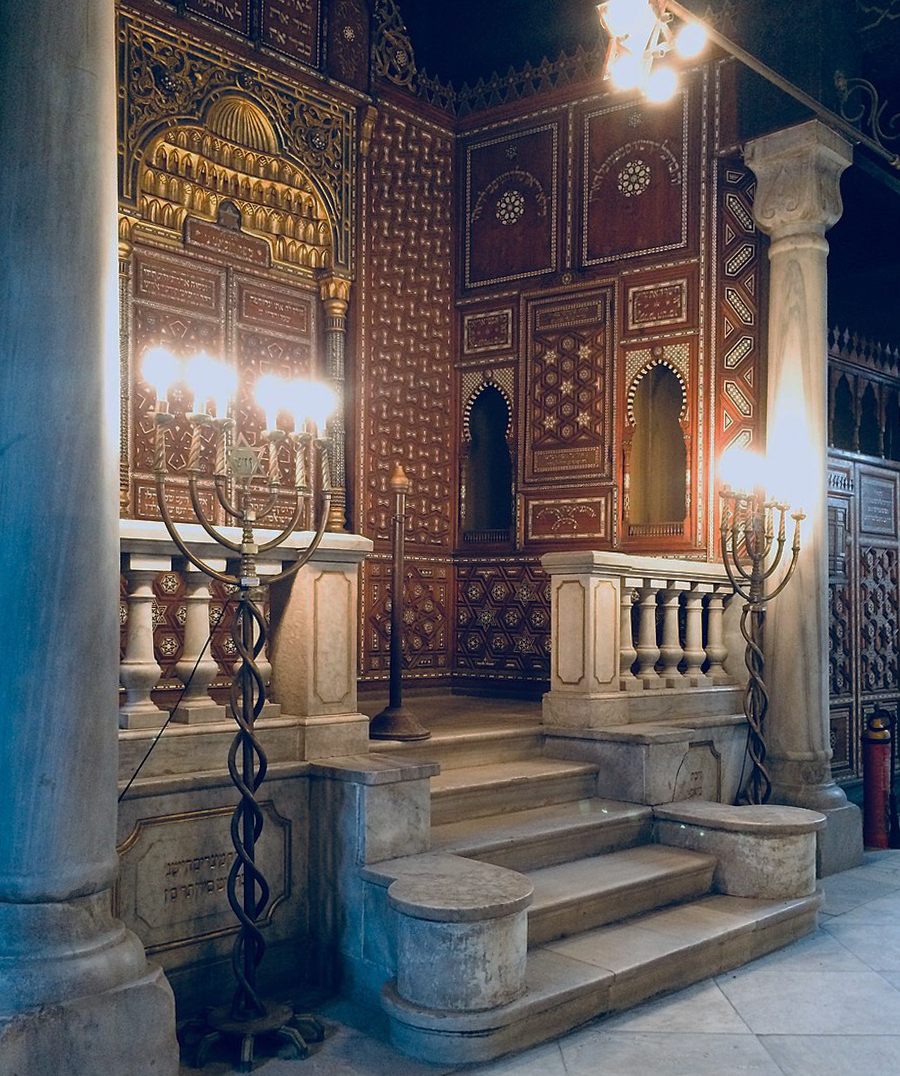
The bimah of the Ben Ezra Synagogue in Cairo, Egypt

Both Judaism and Islam trace their origins to the patriarch Abraham, and they are therefore considered Abrahamic religions. In both Jewish and Muslim tradition, the Jewish and Arab peoples are descended from the two sons of Abraham—Isaac and Ishmael, respectively. While both religions are monotheistic and share many commonalities, they differ based on the fact that Jews do not consider Jesus or Muhammad to be prophets, among many other reasons. The adherents of the religions have interacted with each other since the 7th century, when Islam originated and spread in the Arabian Peninsula. The period under the Umayyad and the Abbasid caliphates between 712 and 1066 has been called the Golden age of Jewish culture in Spain. Non-Muslim monotheists living in these countries, including Jews, were known as dhimmis. Dhimmis were allowed to practice their own religions and administer their own internal affairs, but they were subject to certain restrictions that were not imposed on Muslims. For example, they had to pay the jizya, a per capita tax imposed on free adult non-Muslim males, and they were also forbidden to bear arms or testify in court cases involving Muslims. Many of the laws regarding dhimmis were highly symbolic. For example, dhimmis in some countries were required to wear distinctive clothing, a practice not found in either the Quran or the hadiths but invented in early medieval Baghdad and inconsistently enforced. Jews in Muslim countries were not entirely free from persecution—for example, many were killed, exiled or forcibly converted in the 12th century, in Persia, and by the rulers of the Almohad dynasty in North Africa and Al-Andalus, as well as by the Zaydi imams of Yemen in the 17th century (see Mawza Exile). At times, Jews were also restricted in their choice of residence—in Morocco, for example, Jews were confined to walled quarters (mellahs) beginning in the 15th century and increasingly since the early 19th century.

In the mid-20th century, Jews were expelled from nearly all of the Arab countries. Most have chosen to live in Israel. Today, antisemitic themes including Holocaust denial have become commonplace in the propaganda of Islamic movements such as Hizbullah and Hamas, in the pronouncements of various agencies of the Islamic Republic of Iran, and even in the newspapers and other publications of Refah Partisi.

=== Syncretic movements incorporating Judaism ===
Some movements in other religions include elements of Judaism. Among Christianity, there are a number of denominations of ancient and contemporary Judaizers. The most well-known of these is Messianic Judaism, a religious movement, which arose in the 1960s, In this, elements of the messianic traditions in Judaism, are incorporated in, and melded with the tenets of Christianity. The movement generally states that Jesus is the Jewish Messiah, that he is one of the Three Divine Persons, and that salvation is only achieved through acceptance of Jesus as one's savior. Some members of Messianic Judaism argue that it is a sect of Judaism. Jewish organizations of every denomination reject this, stating that Messianic Judaism is a Christian sect, because it teaches creeds which are identical to those of Pauline Christianity, and because the conditions for the Messiah to have come accordingly within traditional Jewish thought have not yet been met. Another religious movement is the Black Hebrew Israelite group, which not to be confused with less syncretic Black Judaism (a constellation of movements which, depending on their adherence to normative Jewish tradition, receive varying degrees of recognition by the broader Jewish community).

Other examples of syncretism include Semitic neopaganism, loosely organized sects which incorporate pagan, Goddess movement or Wiccan beliefs with some Jewish religious practices; Jewish Buddhists, another loosely organized group that incorporates elements of Buddhism and other Asian spirituality in their faith.

Some Renewal Jews borrow freely and openly from Buddhism, Sufism, Native American religions, and other faiths.

The Kabbalah Centre, which employs teachers from multiple religions, is a one of "New Age Judaism" movements that claims to popularize the kabbalah, part of the Jewish esoteric tradition.

== Criticism ==
Criticism of Judaism may include those that require revisionism to classical Orthodox Judaism, such as that of the modernized denomination of Reconstructionist Judaism as established by American rabbi Mordecai Kaplan, who believed that classical Orthodox Judaism is outdated as a religious belief on its own, and should represent Judaism as a civilization.

On the other hand, some proponents of classical Orthodox Judaism, such as Neturei Karta and similar groups, strongly oppose the growing accommodation to political Zionism by Haredi Jewish groups, such as Agudat Yisrael; a previously anti-Zionist proponent of Orthodox Haredi Judaism whom the Neturei Karta see as betraying Orthodoxy, in the belief that Judaism should never be conflated with the politics of Zionism.

Orthodox Jewish public intellectual and polymath Yeshayahu Leibowitz, in contrast, believed in the separation of synagogue and state, and regarded Reform Judaism as a "historical distortion of the Jewish religion".

== See also ==
- Heaven in Judaism
- List of 21st-century religious leaders#Judaism
- List of religious organizations#Jewish organizations
- Judaism by country
- Outline of Judaism
- Ancient Near East
- Jerusalem

== Bibliography ==
=== Selected cited works ===
- Adler, Yonatan (2022). The Origins of Judaism: An Archaeological-Historical Reappraisal. New Haven, Conn: Yale University Press. ISBN 978-0-300-25490-7. Archived from the original on 21 May 2023.
- Albertz, Rainer (1994a) [1992]. A History of Israelite Religion. Vol. 1: From the Beginnings to the End of the Monarchy. Translated by John Bowden (Reprint ed.). Louisville, Kentucky: Westminster John Knox. ISBN 0-664-21846-6.
- Albertz, Rainer (1994b) [1992]. A History of Israelite Religion. Vol. 2: From the Exile to the Maccabees. Translated by John Bowden (Reprint ed.). Louisville, Kentucky: Westminster John Knox. ISBN 0-664-21847-4.
- Berlin, Adele, ed. (2011). The Oxford Dictionary of the Jewish Religion (2nd ed.). Oxford; New York: Oxford University Press. ISBN 978-0-19-975927-9.
- Boyarin, Daniel (1994). A Radical Jew: Paul and the Politics of Identity. Berkeley, Ca: University of California Press. ISBN 978-0-520-08592-3. LCCN 93036269. Archived from the original on 10 February 2023.
- Cohen, Arthur A.; Mendes-Flohr, Paul, eds. (2009) [1987]. 20th Century Jewish Religious Thought: Original Essays on Critical Concepts, Movements, and Beliefs. Philadelphia, Pa: Jewish Publication Society. ISBN 978-0-8276-0892-4.
- Day, John (2000). Yahweh and the Gods and Goddesses of Canaan. Chippenham: Sheffield Academic Press.
- Deshen, Shlomo; Liebman, Charles S.; Shokeid, Moshe, eds. (2017) [1995]. Israeli Judaism: The Sociology of Religion in Israel. Studies of Israeli Society, 7 (Reprint ed.). London; New York: Routledge. ISBN 978-1-56000-178-2. Archived from the original on 7 July 2023.
- Dever, William G. (2005). Did God Have a Wife?. Grand Rapids, Mich.: Wm. B. Eerdmans Publ.
- Dorff, Elliot N.; Rosett, Arthur (1988). A Living Tree: The Roots and Growth of Jewish Law. Albany, NY: SUNY Press. ISBN 0-88706-459-0. Archived from the original on 31 July 2023.
- Dosick, Wayne (2007). Living Judaism: The Complete Guide to Jewish Belief, Tradition and Practice. New York: HarperCollins. ISBN 978-0-06-062179-7.
- Elazar, Daniel J.; Geffen, Rela Mintz (2012). The Conservative Movement in Judaism: Dilemmas and Opportunities. Albany, NY: SUNY Press. ISBN 978-0-7914-9202-4.
- Finkelstein, Israel (1996). "Ethnicity and Origin of the Iron I Settlers in the Highlands of Canaan: Can the Real Israel Please Stand Up?" The Biblical Archaeologist, 59(4).
- Fonrobert, Charlotte Elisheva (2005). "Purification in Judaism". In Jones, Lindsay (ed.). Encyclopedia of Religion: 15-volume Set (2nd ed.). Detroit, Mi: MacMillan Reference USA. Archived from the original on 16 July 2023 – via Encyclopedia.com.
- Gillman, Neil (1993). Conservative Judaism: The New Century. New York: Behrman House. ISBN 0-87441-547-0. Archived from the original on 21 June 2023.
- Gitelman, Zvi, ed. (2009). Religion or Ethnicity? Jewish Identities in Evolution. New Brunswick, NJ: Rutgers University Press. ISBN 978-0-8135-4450-2.
- Goldenberg, Robert (2007). The Origins of Judaism: From Canaan to the Rise of Islam. Cambridge: Cambridge University Press. ISBN 978-0-521-84453-6.
- Goldscheider, Calvin; Neusner, Jacob, eds. (2004) [1990]. Social Foundations of Judaism (Reprint ed.). Eugene, Or: Wipf and Stock Publ. ISBN 1-59244-943-3. Archived from the original on 24 June 2023.
- Gurock, Jeffrey S. (1996). American Jewish Orthodoxy in Historical Perspective. Hoboken, NJ: KTAV Publ. House. ISBN 0-88125-567-X. Archived from the original on 30 June 2023.
- Gurock, Jeffrey S. (2009). Orthodox Jews in America. Bloomington, In: Indiana University Press. ISBN 978-0-253-35291-0. Archived from the original on 4 July 2023.
- Guttmann, Julius (1964). Trans. by David Silverman, Philosophies of Judaism. Philadelphia, Pa: Jewish Publication Society.
- Holtz, Barry W. (ed.), Back to the Sources: Reading the Classic Jewish Texts. Summit Books.
- Jacobs, Louis (1995). The Jewish Religion: A Companion. Oxford; New York: Oxford University Press. ISBN 0-19-826463-1. OCLC 31938398.
- Jacobs, Louis (2003). A Concise Companion to the Jewish Religion (Online Version). Oxford University Press. ISBN 978-0-19-172644-6. Archived from the original on 13 July 2023.
- Jacobs, Louis (2007). "Judaism". In Berenbaum, Michael; Skolnik, Fred (eds.). Encyclopaedia Judaica. Vol. 11 (2nd ed.). Detroit: Macmillan Reference USA. ISBN 978-0-02-866097-4 – via Encyclopedia.com.
- Johnson, Paul (1988). A History of the Jews. HarperCollins.
- Karesh, Sara E.; Hurvitz, Mitchell M. (2005). Encyclopedia of Judaism. Encyclopedia of World Religions. J. Gordon Melton, Series Editor. New York: Facts On File. ISBN 0-8160-5457-6.
- Khanbaghi, A. (2006). The Fire, the Star and the Cross: Minority Religions in Medieval and Early Modern Iran. IB Tauris.
- Langton, Daniel R. (2011). Normative Judaism? Jews, Judaism and Jewish Identity. Gorgias Press. ISBN 978-1-60724-161-4.
- Levenson, Jon Douglas (2012). Inheriting Abraham: The Legacy of the Patriarch in Judaism, Christianity, and Islam. Princeton, NJ; Oxford: Princeton University Press. ISBN 978-0-691-15569-2. Archived from the original on 4 June 2023.
- Lewis, Bernard (1984). The Jews of Islam. Princeton, NJ; Oxford: Princeton University Press. ISBN 0-691-00807-8.
- Lewis, Bernard (1999). Semites and Anti-Semites: An Inquiry into Conflict and Prejudice. W. W. Norton & Co. ISBN 0-393-31839-7.
- Mayer, Egon; Kosmin, Barry; Keysar, Ariela. "The American Jewish Identity Survey", a subset of The American Religious Identity Survey, City University of New York Graduate Center. An article on this survey is printed in The New York Jewish Week, 2 November 2001.
- Mendes-Flohr, Paul (2005). "Judaism". In Thomas Riggs (ed.). Worldmark Encyclopedia of Religious Practices. Vol. 1. Farmington Hills, Mi: Thomson Gale. ISBN 978-0-7876-6611-8. Archived from the original on 10 June 2023 – via Encyclopedia.com.
- Meyer, Michael A. (1988). Response to Modernity: A History of the Reform Movement in Judaism. New York: Oxford University Press. ISBN 978-0-19-505167-4.
- Nadler, Allan (1997). The Faith of the Mithnagdim: Rabbinic Responses to Hasidic Rapture. Johns Hopkins Jewish studies. Baltimore, Md: Johns Hopkins University Press. ISBN 978-0-8018-6182-6.
- Neusner, Jacob (1992). A Short History of Judaism: Three Meals, Three Epochs. Minneapolis, Mn: Fortress Press. ISBN 0-8006-2552-8. Archived from the original on 25 June 2023.
- Neusner, Jacob (1993). Purity in Rabbinic Judaism. A Systematic Account of the Sources, Media, Effects, and Removal of Uncleanness. South Florida Studies in the History of Judaism, 95. Atlanta, Ga: Scholars Press. ISBN 1-55540-929-6.
- Neusner, Jacob; Avery-Peck, Alan J., eds. (2003) [2000]. The Blackwell Companion to Judaism (Reprint ed.). Malden, Mass: Blackwell Publ. ISBN 1-57718-058-5. Archived from the original on 10 July 2023.
- Raphael, Marc Lee (1984). Profiles in American Judaism: the Reform, Conservative, Orthodox, and Reconstructionist traditions in historical perspective. San Francisco, Ca: Harper & Row. ISBN 0-06066801-6.
- Rosenak, Michael (1987). Commandments and Concerns: Jewish Religious Education in Secular Society. Philadelphia, Pa: Jewish Publ. Society. ISBN 0-8276-0279-0. Archived from the original on 31 July 2023.
- Rudavsky, David (1979) [1967]. Modern Jewish Religious Movements: A History of Emancipation and Abjustment (3rd rev. ed.). New York: Behrman House. ISBN 0-87441-286-2.
- Schiffman, Lawrence H. (2003). Jon Bloomberg; Samuel Kapustin (eds.). Understanding Second Temple and Rabbinic Judaism. Jersey, NJ: KTAV Publ. House. ISBN 978-0-88125-813-4.
- Segal, Eliezer (2008). Judaism: The e-Book. State College, Pa: Journal of Buddhist Ethics Online Books. ISBN 978-09801633-1-5.
- Simon, Reeva; Laskier, Michael; Reguer, Sara (eds.) (2002). The Jews of the Middle East and North Africa in Modern Times, New York: Columbia University Press.
- Singer, Isidore; et al., eds. (1901–1906). The Jewish Encyclopedia. Vol. 1–12. New York: Funk & Wagnalls http://jewishencyclopedia.com/. Online version
- Stillman, Norman (1979). The Jews of Arab Lands: A History and Source Book. Philadelphia, Pa: Jewish Publication Society. ISBN 0-8276-0198-0.
- Visotzky, Burton L.; Fishman, David E., eds. (2018) [1999]. From Mesopotamia to Modernity: Ten Introductions to Jewish History and Literature (Reprint ed.). London; New York: Routledge. ISBN 978-0-8133-6717-0. Archived from the original on 8 July 2023.
- Walsh, J.P.M. (1987). The Mighty from Their Thrones. Eugene, Or: Wipf and Stock Publ.
- Waxman, Chaim I., ed. (2008). Religious Zionism Post Disengagement: Future Directions. Orthodox Forum Series. New York: Michael Scharf Publ. Trust, Yeshiva University Press. ISBN 978-1-60280-022-9. Archived from the original on 5 July 2023.
- Weber, Max (1967). Ancient Judaism. Glencoe, Il: The Free Press, ISBN 0-02-934130-2.
- Wertheimer, Jack, ed. (1993). The Modern Jewish Experience: A Reader's Guide. New York; London: NYU Press. ISBN 0-8147-9261-8. Archived from the original on 9 June 2023.
- Yaron, Y.; Pessah, Joe; Qanaï, Avraham; El-Gamil, Yosef (2003). An Introduction to Karaite Judaism: History, Theology, Practice and Culture. Albany, NY: Qirqisani Center. ISBN 978-0-9700775-4-7.
- Zohar, Zion, ed. (2005). Sephardic and Mizrahi Jewry: From the Golden Age of Spain to Modern Times. New York; London: NYU Press. ISBN 0-8147-9705-9.

=== Further reading ===
Encyclopedias

- Berlin, Adele, ed. (2011). The Oxford Dictionary of the Jewish Religion (2nd ed.). Oxford; New York: Oxford University Press. ISBN 978-0-19-975927-9.
- Jacobs, Louis (2003). A Concise Companion to the Jewish Religion (Online Version). Oxford University Press. ISBN 978-0-19-172644-6.
- Karesh, Sara E.; Hurvitz, Mitchell M. (2005). Encyclopedia of Judaism. Encyclopedia of World Religions. J. Gordon Melton, Series Editor. New York: Facts On File. ISBN 0-8160-5457-6.
- Neusner, Jacob; Avery-Peck, Alan J.; Green, William Scott, eds. (1999). The Encyclopedia of Judaism. Vol. 1–3. Leiden; New York: Brill; Continuum. ISBN 978-90-04-10583-6.
- Neusner, Jacob (2000). The Halakhah: An Encyclopaedia of the Law of Judaism. The Brill Reference Library of Judaism. Vol. 1–5. Leiden: Brill. ISBN 90-04-11617-6.
- Neusner, Jacob; Avery-Peck, Alan J. (2004). The Routledge Dictionary of Judaism (e-Book). New York; London: Routledge. ISBN 0-203-63391-1.
- Singer, Isidore; et al., eds. (1901–1906). The Jewish Encyclopedia: A Descriptive Record of the History, Religion, Literature, and Customs of the Jewish People from the Earliest Times to the Present Day. Vol. 1–12. New York: Funk & Wagnalls. Online version
- Skolnik, Fred, ed. (2007). Encyclopaedia Judaica. Vol. 1–22 (2nd rev. ed.). Farmington Hills, Mi: Macmillan Reference USA. ISBN 978-002-865-928-2.

General works

- Cohn-Sherbok, Dan (2003). Judaism: History, Belief, and Practice. London; New York: Routledge. ISBN 0-415-23660-6.
- Dosick, Wayne (2007). Living Judaism: The Complete Guide to Jewish Belief, Tradition and Practice. New York: HarperCollins. ISBN 978-0-06-062179-7.
- Jacobs, Louis (1995). The Jewish Religion: A Companion. Oxford; New York: Oxford University Press. ISBN 0-19-826463-1. OCLC 31938398.
- de Lange, Nicholas (2002) [2000]. An Introduction to Judaism. Cambridge: Cambridge University Press. ISBN 0-521-46073-5.
- Neusner, Jacob (1991). An Introduction to Judaism: A Textbook and Reader. Louisville, Kentucky: Westminster/John Knox Press. ISBN 0-664-25348-2.
- Neusner, Jacob; Avery-Peck, Alan J., eds. (2003) [2000]. The Blackwell Companion to Judaism (Reprint ed.). Malden, Mass: Blackwell Publ. ISBN 1-57718-058-5.
- Segal, Eliezer (2008). Judaism: The e-Book. State College, Pa: Journal of Buddhist Ethics Online Books. ISBN 978-09801633-1-5.
- Wertheimer, Jack, ed. (1993). The Modern Jewish Experience: A Reader's Guide. New York; London: NYU Press. ISBN 0-8147-9261-8.

Regional contemporary

- Deshen, Shlomo; Liebman, Charles S.; Shokeid, Moshe, eds. (2017) [1995]. Israeli Judaism: The Sociology of Religion in Israel. Studies of Israeli Society, 7 (Reprint ed.). London; New York: Routledge. ISBN 978-1-56000-178-2.
- Liebman, Charles S.; Cohen, Steven Martin (1990). Two Worlds of Judaism: The Israeli and American Experiences. New Haven, Conn: Yale University Press. ISBN 978-0-300-04726-4.
- Raphael, Marc Lee (2003). Judaism in America. New York: Columbia University Press. ISBN 0-231-12060-5.
- Rebhum, Uzi (2016). Jews and the American Religious Landscape. New York: Columbia University Press. ISBN 978-0-231-17826-6.
- Wertheimer, Jack (2018). The New American Judaism: How Jews Practice Their Religion Today. Princeton, NJ; Oxford: Princeton University Press. ISBN 978-0-691-18129-5.
