= Aguna (disambiguation) =

Agunah is a halachic term for a Jewish woman who is "chained" to her marriage.

Aguna or agunah may also refer to:

- Aguna (butterfly), a genus of skipper butterfly
- Aguna language, a Gbe language of Benin and Togo
- The Agunah, a 1974 novel by Chaim Grade
- Aguna, a Georgian wine

See also

- Agunaix, a monotypic moth genus in the subfamily Arctiinae
