= Vilner Emes =

Yiddish communist newspaper in Lithuania

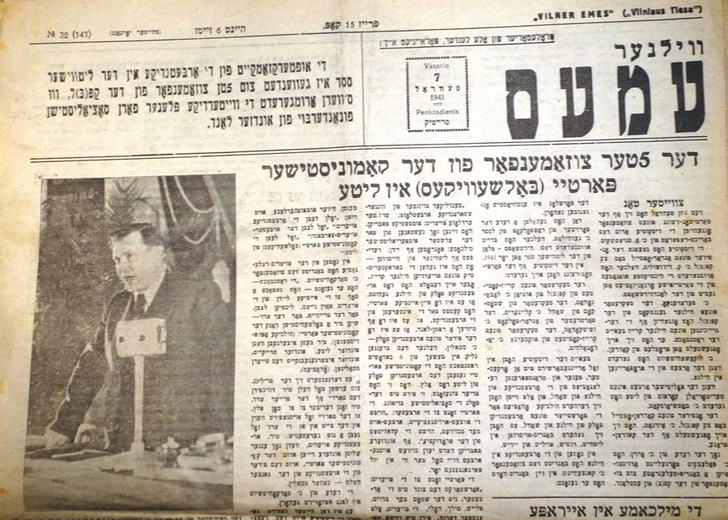
- February 7, 1941, issue of Vilner Emes
- Native name: ווילנער עמעס
- Type: Daily
- Editor-in-chief: Dovid Umru
- Founded: August 21, 1940
- Ceased publication: March 13, 1941
- Political alignment: Communist
- Language: Yiddish
- City: Vilnius
- Country: Lithuanian SSR
- Circulation: 8,100

Vilner Emes (Yiddish: ווילנער עמעס, 'Vilnius Truth') was a Yiddish language daily newspaper published in Vilnius from 1940 to 1941.

== Profile ==
The newspaper was published daily. The first issue was published on August 21, 1940, replacing the newspaper Vilner Togblat. Vilner Emes was an organ of the Vilnius City Committee of the Communist Party of Lithuania. The newspaper had a circulation of 8,100 copies.

Initially the newspaper merely contained translations and reprints from Pravda and other central Soviet press organs, but later the newspaper would include both articles from the Soviet press with coverage on local affairs. Vilner Emes followed Soviet Yiddish orthography of Soviet Yiddish, and thus did not utilize the final forms of Hebrew letters.

== Editorial team ==
Dovid Umru, a member of the Kaunas Yiddish writers grouping, became the chief editor of Vilner Emes and he would edit every issue of the publication throughout its seven months of existence. Salomon Belis-Legis was the editorial secretary of the newspaper. Several members of the Yung-Vilne literary group worked for the newspaper, such as Abraham Sutzkever, Hirsh Glick, Chaim Grade, Leyzer Volf, Shmerke Kaczerginski, as well as Leah Rudnitsky and Sholem Zhirman. With a significant grouping of Vilnius Yiddish writers on its staff, the newspaper dedicated significant attention to local Yiddish literature. Białystok-based Berl Mark was an editor of the newspaper, providing coverage on Belorussia and Ukraine. The Yung-Vilne editors and reporters of Vilner Emes generally cooperated well with YIVO.

== Closure ==
115 issues were published in 1940, and 61 issues were published in 1941. The last issue was published on March 13, 1941. On March 14, 1941, it was announced that Vilner Emes had been merged into the Kaunas-based newspaper and organ of the Central Committee of the Communist Party of Lithuania Der Emes. Soviet Yiddish writer Zelik Axelrod, who was touring Vilnius and Kaunas in early 1941, had urged Yiddish writers to protests the plans to close down Vilner Emes. Later accounts attribute, in part, his execution in Minsk in mid-1941 to this protest. In July 1941, during the German occupation of Lithuania, the former Vilner Emes editor Umru was killed by the Gestapo.
