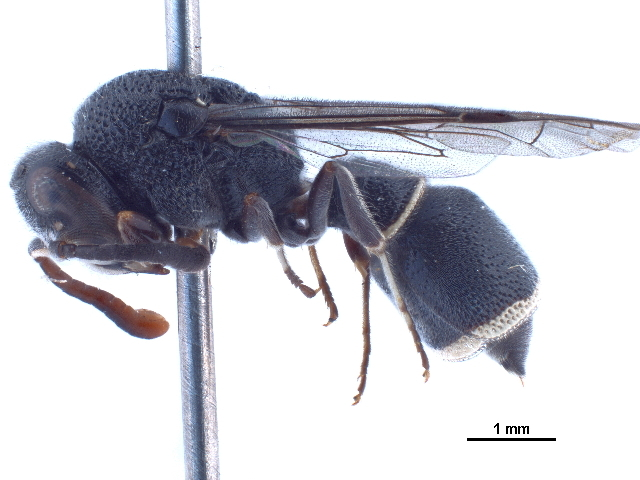
- Subancistrocerus sichelii

Scientific classification
- Domain: Eukaryota
- Kingdom: Animalia
- Phylum: Arthropoda
- Class: Insecta
- Order: Hymenoptera
- Family: Vespidae
- Subfamily: Eumeninae
- Genus: Subancistrocerus; Saussure, 1855

Type species
- Subancistrocerus sichelii (Saussure, 1856)

= Subancistrocerus =

Genus of wasps

Subancistrocerus is an Australian, Indomalayan, African and Palearctic genus of potter wasps. Males of this genus used to have an enlarged antennal tip.

== Species ==
The following species are members of the genus Subancistrocerus:

- Subancistrocerus abdominalis Giordani Soika, 1994
- Subancistrocerus albocinctus Giordani Soika, 1993
- Subancistrocerus angulatus Giordani Soika, 1994
- Subancistrocerus bambogensis Giordani Soika, 1981
- Subancistrocerus budongo (Meade-Waldo, 1915)
- Subancistrocerus burensis (Giordani Soika, 1935)
- Subancistrocerus camicrus (Cameron, 1904)
- Subancistrocerus clavicornis (Smith, 1859)
- Subancistrocerus domesticus Williams, 1928
- Subancistrocerus esakii Bequard & Yasu., 1939
- Subancistrocerus giordanii Castro, 2003
- Subancistrocerus imbecillus Saussure, 1852
- Subancistrocerus indochinensis Gusenleitner, 2000
- Subancistrocerus kankauensis Schulthess, 1934
- Subancistrocerus massaicus (Cameron, 1910)
- Subancistrocerus monstricornis Giordani Soika, 1941
- Subancistrocerus nigritus Giordani Soika & Kojima, 1995
- Subancistrocerus obiensis Giordani Soika, 1995
- Subancistrocerus palauensis Bequard & Yasu., 1939
- Subancistrocerus redemptus Giordani Soika, 1965
- Subancistrocerus reflexus Giordani Soika, 1995
- Subancistrocerus sichelii (Saussure, 1856)
- Subancistrocerus similis Giordani Soika, 1995
- Subancistrocerus solomonis Giordani Soika, 1981
- Subancistrocerus spinicollis Giordani Soika, 1995
- Subancistrocerus spinithorax Giordani Soika, 1995
- Subancistrocerus thalassarctos (Dalla Torre, 1889)
- Subancistrocerus tristis Giordani Soika, 1992
- Subancistrocerus yapensis Yas., 1945
