= Sutskever =

Sutskever, Sutzkever or Suckewer (Yiddish: סוצקעווער, Hebrew: סוצקבר; Russian: Суцке́вер) is a surname. Originated in Yiddish as a locational surname indicating a family origin from a Belarusian village of Sutskava or similar place with the addition of the Yiddish suffix ־ער (-er, for a resident or inhabitant of a place).

Notable people with this surname include:

- Abraham Sutzkever (1913–2010), Yiddish poet
- Ilya Sutskever (born 1986), Israeli-American AI researcher
- Rachel Suckever (1904–1943/1944), Polish painter
- Szymon Suckewer (born 1938), Polish-American physicist
