= Vilnai =

Vilnai or Vilnay (Hebrew: וִילְנָאִי) is a Hebrew surname, a Hebraization of a surname of Ashkenazi Jewish toponymic surname literally means "one from Vilna": Wilner, Vilner, Wilnaer. Notable people with the surname include:

- Matan Vilnai, Israeli politician and a former IDF major general
- Zev Vilnay, Israeli geographer, author and lecturer
