= The Yeshiva =

Novel by Chaim Grade

- Covers of volumes 1 and 2
- Author: Chaim Grade
- Original title: צמח אַטלאַס
- Translator: Curt Leviant
- Cover artist: Jane Clark (v1); Bill Tinker (v2)
- Language: Yiddish
- Published: 1967,1968 (יידיש־נאַציאָנאַלן אַרבעטער־פאַרבאַנד) (Yiddish); 1976,1977 (The Bobbs-Merrill Company) (English)
- Pages: 394 (v1), 399 (v2)
- ISBN: 978-0-672-52264-2 (v1); 978-0-672-52344-1 (v2)

The Yeshiva is an English translation by Curt Leviant of the Yiddish novel Tsemakh Atlas (צמח אַטלאַס) by Chaim Grade. It was published in two volumes in Yiddish and also in translation. It was also published in a Hebrew translation, with the same title as the Yiddish.

The first volume was published as if it were standalone, with no volume number and no mention of a continuation. The second volume was subtitled "Volume II: Masters and Disciples." The second volume, and later books by Grade (for example, Rabbis and Wives) explicitly refer to the first volume as "Volume I" in their "by the same author" lists.

== Main characters ==
The main protagonist is Tsemakh Atlas, who at the beginning of the novel is a junior Novaredker rabbi sent out to open his own yeshiva in a small town. He grapples with his uninspired devotion, atheist-leaning doubts, and frequent disapproval of most everybody's behavior, based on the tenets of the Musar movement.

The character of Reb Avraham-Shaye the Kosover is very closely based on Reb Avraham Yeshaya Karelitz from Kosova, commonly known as the Chazon Ish. As is common, the rabbi is known by the title of his most famous work. The title Chazon Ish is Hebrew for Vision of a man. Although "Ish" in Hebrew means man, it is an acronym for Avraham Yeshaya, that is, the title is Vision of Avraham Yeshaya. In the novel, the fictional Kosover's most famous work is The Vision of Avraham.

The character of Chaikl Vilner is very closely based on Grade himself. The name is one Grade had used as his persona in poetry: Chaikl is the diminutive of Chaim and a Vilner is someone who hails from Vilna. In the novel, further similarities are that Chaikl is the son of a Hebrew teacher and maskil, as was Grade, Chaikl's father is named Shlomo-Motte, a Yiddish corruption of Grade's father's name Shlomo Mordechai, and just like Grade learned extensively with the Chazon Ish, so too does Chaikl learn extensively with Reb Avraham-Shaye.

== Plot summary ==
=== Volume one ===
Tsemakh Atlas is an advanced Talmudic student/teacher in Nareva, committed to the Musar philosophy, which puts him at odds with most of his fellow Jews, observant or not, learned or not. He initially spends his time recruiting children from the Soviet Union, mostly without their parents' permissions, and smuggles them into Lithuania. After the death of Rav Yosef-Yoizl Hurwitz, his rabbi sends Tsemakh to Amdur to found a new yeshiva, knowing this mission will not succeed. Tsemakh ends up engaged to the plain, quiet daughter of an Amdur storekeeper, but he is told by the townspeople that the man is vicious and cruel, and certainly lying about the dowry. He flees to Lomzhe, his hometown where his aunt and uncle live. Their three sons work for Volodya Stupel, a wealthy flour merchant who fondly remembers Tsemakh from childhood school days, but whose arrogance offends Tsemakh. Tsemakh meets Volodya's sister Slava, a wild and vivacious beauty who is so impressed by Tsemakh that she decides to definitely break up with her married lover and instead to marry Tsemakh. When he does not return, after a few days Slava befriends Tsemakh's aunt and pays her own visit, impressing Tsemakh with her displays of ordinary kindness.

Tsemakh marries Slava and becomes irreligious, but he cannot stop rebuking everyone in the Musar style, including customers of Volodya, to Volodya's financial horror. Tsemakh returns to religion and studying Talmud again, and grows distant from Slava. Volodya's brother takes on a Jewish maid, but his son Lolla gets her pregnant. As plans are made to dump her in some gentile village, Slava pays what turns out to be a curt visit to her ex-lover. Tsemakh learns of the maid's plight, and threatens to expose the whole sordid mess if the Stupels can't find a Jewish home for the maid. They cannot, leading to an all-round crisis, just as Slava returns. The maid flees, and Tsemakh leaves Lomzhe to set up his own yeshiva in Valkenik He tells Slava not to come with him, but to make peace with her family.

In Vilna, Tsemakh recruits three boys, Melechke, Chaikl, and Hertzke. In each case, fatherly opposition must be overcome, sometimes with great difficulty. Tsemakh also recruits an old Hebrew teacher to be his partner.

In Valkenik, Tsemakh faces several challenges and conflicts, often without any effect. He must resist the attractive Rokhshte (Ronya), the married daughter of the yeshiva's cook, whose husband is home only twice a year. He must rebuke a student whose charming friendliness with Leitshe, the unmarried daughter, has led to better food for him, the reputation the two are engaged, and scandal when he officially gets engaged to a rich man's daughter, and fails badly when the student dismisses it, half thinking he can blackmail Tsemakh for his broken engagement from Amdur. The estranged parents of Hertzke show up, the father (Vova Barbitoler) from Vilna, the mother (Confrada) from Argentina, to take the boy away, creating a public spectacle, ending with Hertzke going with his mother, rejecting his father and Judaism. There is sharp disagreement regarding the successor to the town's rabbi, regarding whom Tsemakh refuses to take sides. And to the surprise of everyone, Slava shows up, impressing the townspeople with her beauty and her kind and wealthy bearing, but finds she and Tsemakh are still too far apart mentally, so she returns to Lomzhe.

During the Passover holiday, Tsemakh makes an attempt to convince Ronya's husband to stay on as a third yeshiva teacher, only annoying him. The yeshiva boys return to their families, Chaikl invites his father, Shlomo-Motte to join him in Valkenik for his health. Chaikl and his father end up staying with the Vorobey family, mother Freyda, daughter Kreyndl, son Nokhemka (Nachum), who live in disgrace because the father Bentzye (Ben-Zion) has abandoned his family to live with a gentile woman in a nearby village. (They get by thanks to the American sister of Freyda.) The town's rabbi and his wife retire, leaving for the Holy Land. The new rabbi moves in, and after Lag B'Omer, the first of the many religious summer vacationers (who board out by a cardboard factory out of the way in the deep woods) shows up, the very famous Reb Avraham-Shaye the Kosover, with his sister Hadassah and her children. Reb Avraham-Shaye avoids having anything to do with the town's residents or problems if possible, but he is drawn into a few issues. Most surprisingly, he takes on Chaikl as a roommate and personal student, saving him from a nascent scandal involving Kreyndl, who was attracted to Chaikl. He also rebukes Tsemakh quite strongly, warning him that his Musar talks, by going over the heads of his students, is actually damaging them.

=== Volume two ===
Tsemakh takes Reb Avraham-Shaye's criticism to heart and then some, and ceases speaking to the students at all. After Shevuos, the rest of the summer vacationers show up, a disparate group of advanced yeshiva students and rabbis. Into this milieu, Vova returns, now a pitiful beggar, but swearing vengeance on Tsemakh and Chaikl for getting his son to come to Valkenik in the first place. His plan is to simply be a loud-mouthed disruptive boor, endlessly reciting his litany of complaints until the two leave. But when he visits Chaikl in the woods, Reb Avraham-Shaye patiently and respectfully listens to Vova, who ends up reduced to tears of shame when he is told to make complete peace with those he has had trouble with, including Confrada. Vova agrees, and leaves.

The younger Valkenik generation, agitating for a more secular life, have pushed for a library in the town, but they want more. The conflict is so serious that a small riot breaks out in the synagogue on the Sabbath. Meanwhile, they have successfully corrupted most of the yeshiva students into reading forbidden books from their library. When the books are discovered, the students are unapologetic, and Tsemakh refuses to take a stand regarding the books. Meanwhile, one of the most respected of the yeshiva students is accused of getting a mentally ill woman pregnant in the neighboring village. He is absolved when the actual father is identified, but it becomes clear that the charges were deliberately pushed by the library faction. Tsemakh authorizes vengeance, and arranges with the town's crook to have the books stolen and burned. This is too much for the secularists, who take to blockading the yeshiva. The leaders of the Valkenik religious community seek out Reb Avraham-Shaye's counsel. He declares the books must be replaced and Tsemakh must leave immediately. Tsemakh leaves for Amdur, and learns his first fiancée, whom he had abandoned, had died after six months. Horrified at the consequences of his behavior, he returns to Lomzhe. He asks Slava for a divorce, she refuses. Tsemakh stays with his Uncle Ziml, now a widower, vowing to take off and wander as a beggar.

A year later, shortly before Rosh Hashana, Chaikl's father dies. Vova shows up during the overnight vigil, drunk, cursing all his former enemies, proud that he changed his mind about taking Reb Avraham-Shaye's advice, but Vova also dies a few months later during Hanukkah. At the end of his year of mourning for his father, Chaikl visits the Navaredok yeshiva in Nareva for the months of Elul and Tishrei. A year later, he visits again, arriving just in time for Yom Kippur. There he finds Tsemakh, who has ended his wanderings and returned to Navaredok, a full-time penitent. Chaikl befriends Moshe Chayit the Lohoysker, one of the now grown-up children smuggled out of Russia by Tsemakh. The Lohoysker has become defiant, rude, openly sarcastic in his non-observance and skepticism, but with no skills except rabbinic training, he is dependent on the yeshiva for room and board. When Rav Simkha Feinerman, the rosh yeshiva leaves for a Yeshiva Council funding conference in Vilna, he leaves Yankl Poltaver in charge.

During the conference, an appeal to Reb Avraham-Shaye to adjudicate gets rejected, but Reb Avraham-Shaye personally visits Rav Simkha, asking about Chaikl. Upon learning of Tsemakh's return as the penitent, he tells Rav Simkha that by ignoring his wife, he is not a penitent, and wants Rav Simkha to tell Tsemakh to return. In Nareva, in the rabbi's absence, Lohoysker becomes even more insulting, crashing an all-night Musar meeting. Yankl, having learned his Musar from the younger Tsemakh, makes life miserable for the trustee handling the free loans for widows, on the grounds that the trustee is uncaring and stingy. The trustee resigns, but no one else is willing to take on the job, leading the widows to protest and the yeshiva facing eviction from the congregation that houses it. Yankl also makes life miserable for Melechke since he is not into the Musar philosophy, and Melechke ends up running off without warning, abetted by Lohoysker. Rav Simkha returns, and per the congregation's demands, sends Yankl away to found a yeshiva to be run by Reb Duber, he soon announces success in Amdur. Meanwhile, Tsemakh breaks his policy of non-involvement and violently evicts Lohoysker. Rav Simkha has not yet decided whether to pass on Reb Avraham-Shaye's demand.

In quick succession, one yeshiva student tries to commit suicide, Reb Duber finds himself in Amdur, with Yankl gone and most of the townspeople hostile. Yankl returns and uses Purim as an excuse to tastelessly and publicly insult the trustee, and one of the most beloved of the yeshiva students dies of his weak heart. Slava shows up, and scandalously receives Lohoysker and Chaikl as guests. Tsemakh is forced to leave with Slava, and takes Lohoysker and Chaikl with him. They leave for Vilna, and Tsemakh meets with Reb Avraham-Shaye, who convinces Tsemakh to stay with his wife and to go into business. Tsemakh becomes a quiet sort, although marital harmony is still elusive for him. Lohoysker discovers that he is trapped in the yeshiva world: not only does he have no other skills, he has no other interests, and so he becomes observant again. Chaikl too finds himself trapped, but not quite as strongly.

In the end, Reb Avraham-Shaye and his wife board a train, beginning their relocation to the Holy Land. Tsemakh and Chaikl watch the train leave, deeply aware that their future remains forever tied to the Kosover's influence.

== Reception ==
Placing the action of his novel in the environs of Vilna, [Lithuania], after the First World War, Grade spins an alternately moody and volcanic tale which is not only breathtaking in its polychromatic effect, but which also gives visible evidence of the profound and compassionate understanding of man's vulnerability to his own instincts.

— Moshe Moskowitz, Judaism, Winter 1978, pp. 115–120

Those portions of the book that offer pictures of East European Jewish life seem a little heavy and slap-dash, lacking in novelistic finish, as if Grade were counting too much on the keyed-in responses of his Yiddish audience. But whenever the book turns to the inner life of Tsemakh, it comes entirely alive.

— Irving Howe, The New Republic, 2/26/1977, pp 24–25
