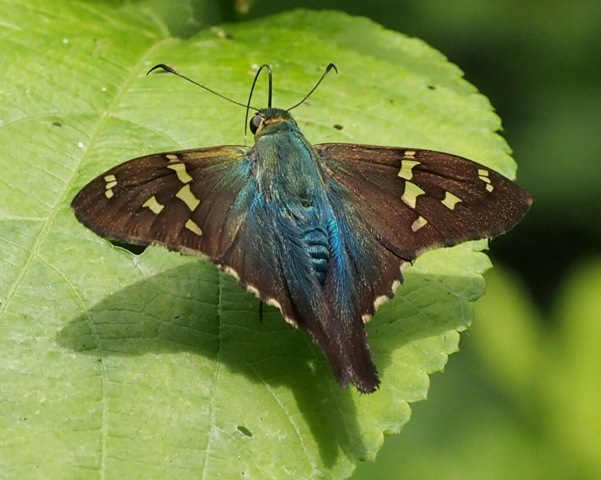

Scientific classification
- Kingdom: Animalia
- Phylum: Arthropoda
- Class: Insecta
- Order: Lepidoptera
- Family: Hesperiidae
- Genus: Aguna
- Species: A. claxon

Binomial name
- Aguna claxon Evans, 1952

= Aguna claxon =

Species of butterfly

Aguna claxon, the emerald aguna, is a species of dicot skipper in the butterfly family Hesperiidae. It is found in Central America, North America, and South America.
