= Vilner =

Vilner/Wilner is a German and Jewish surname meaning (in Yiddish) "from Wilna/Vilne" (Hebrew: וילנר). Alternative form: Vilensky/Wilenski. Notable people with the surname include:

- Alan M. Wilner (born 1937), American jurist
- Eleanor Wilner (born 1937), American poet and editor
- Chaim Vilner, a name Chaim Grade used in his semi-biographical works
- Izrael Chaim Wilner (1917 - 1943), Jewish resistance fighter and participant in the Warsaw Ghetto Uprising.
- Liron Vilner (born 1979), Israeli footballer
- Max Wilner, (1895-1956) Yiddish Actor
- Max R. Wilner, (1881-??), David Kessler's step-son. Involved in early Yiddish Theatre
- Meir Vilner (1918–2003), Israeli politician
- Robert F. Wilner (1889-1960), Suffragan Bishop of the Philippine Islands
- Sheri Wilner (born 1969) American playwright
- Thomas Wilner (born 1944), partner of Shearman & Sterling's International Trade and Global Relations Practice
- Sidney (Sid) Wilner (born 1929) American actor of Yiddish Theatre
- Yakov Vilner (1899–1931), Ukrainian chess player

== Other uses ==
- Vilna Troupe, or Vilner trupe in Yiddish
- Vilna Gaon, or Vilner Gaon
- Vilner tog, Yiddish newspaper published in the 1920s and 1930s
