= Chaim Grade =

Yiddish writer and poet (1910–1982)

- חיים גראַדע
- Grade in 1968
- Born: April 4, 1910; Vilna, Russian Empire
- Died: 26 June 1982 (aged 72); The Bronx, New York, US
- Resting place: Riverside Cemetery, New Jersey
- Citizenship: Polish, Soviet, American
- Occupations: Writer; poet
- Writing career
- Notable works: Musernikes; The Agunah; The Yeshiva

Chaim Grade (GRAHD-uh; חיים גראַדע; April 4, 1910 – June 26, 1982) was one of the leading Yiddish writers of the twentieth century.

Grade was born in Vilna in the Russian Empire and died in The Bronx, New York. He is buried in Riverside Cemetery, Saddle Brook, New Jersey.

Grade was raised Orthodox, and studied in a yeshiva as a teenager, but ended up with a secular outlook, in part due to his poetic ambitions. Losing his family in the Holocaust, he resettled in New York, and increasingly took to fiction, writing in Yiddish.

== Prewar: early life and education ==
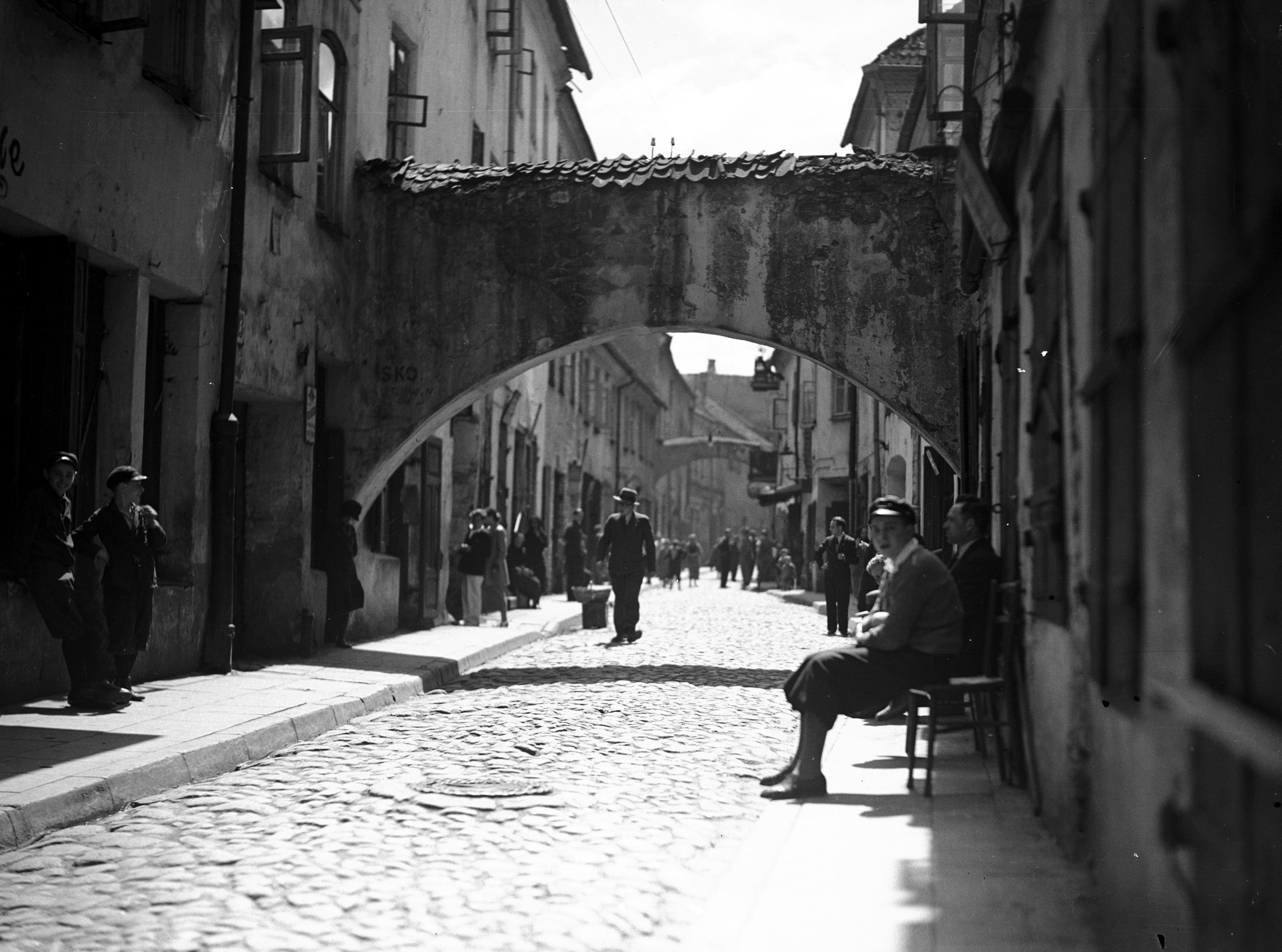
Vilna, Jatkever gas, 1935. Chaim lived with his mother in a room at Jatkever gas, 15 (now Mesinių str. 11).

Chaim Grade was born in 1910, the son of Shloyme-Mordkhe Grade, a teacher of Hebrew language, and his second wife, a rabbi's daughter Vela Blumenthal. He had five brothers from his father's first marriage, and two sisters, both of whom died in childhood. The family was quite poor, and became more so during the First World War. His father worked as a peddler at day, and as a watchman at night, before he became ill in 1919. His mother then started to work in her sister's store, and after that as a fruit peddler, selling frozen apples. Multiple relatives, among them his three older brothers, emigrated to America. Shloyme-Mordhe, half-paralyzed, lived with his oldest son until the son's death; he himself died in 1927.

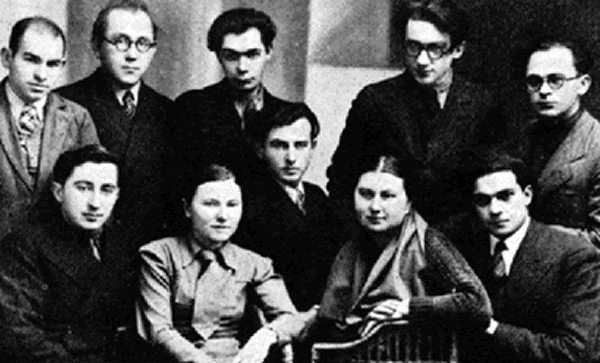
Artists of Yung-Vilne. From the right: Shmerke Kaczerginski, Abraham Sutzkever, Elchanan Wogler, Chaim Grade, Leyzer Volf, sitting: Mosze Lewin, Szejna Efron, Szymszon Kahan, Rachela Suckewer, and Bencijon Michtom

During World War I, when Vilna was under German occupation, Chaim was mistakenly thought to be an orphan and sent to kinder-internat and then to the arbeter kinderheym. Against his father's wish, his mother sent the boy to the mussar Novaredok yeshiva, the "most extreme wing of non-Hasidic Lithuanian Orthodoxy"; he spent 1924–1926 in novaredoker yeshivas in Bialystok, Bielsk-Podlaski, and Olkenik. He then studied for seven years with Reb Avrohom Yeshaya Karelitz, the Chazon Ish, one of the great Torah scholars, who later became one of the leaders of the Israeli Haredi community. Grade met Chazon Ish in Okelnik, and decided to leave the yeshiva and study with the Reb in Vilna instead. Chazon Ish was against the Novaredok ideas. Nevertheless, Grade usually spent at least one month (Elul) in the novaredoker yeshivas each year between 1925 and 1933. In 1933, Chazon Ish emigrated to Eretz Israel and settled in Bnei Brak. At the same time, Grade left yeshiva and Orthodoxy. According to his translator Curt Leviant, Grade was "booted out of his yeshiva when teachers found him writing secular Yiddish poetry".

In 1934, Grade published his first poem, and was an active member of the Yung-Vilne group of artists and writers, together with poets Shmerke Kaczerginski, Abraham Sutzkever, Leyzer Volf, and others. His first poem collection, Yo ("Yes"), was published in 1936. In 1937, he married Frume-Libe Klepfish.

Yo is Grade's only poetic collection that was republished (in Vilna, Moscow, Paris, Buenos Aires, and New York). It includes poems about his mother, as well as a poem Ezekiel written in an "apocalyptic prophetic voice".

Grade's next work was the semi-biographical epic poem Musernikes about his life in the Novaredok yeshivas, published in 1939. He returned later to the mussar theme in his postwar prose.

According to David B. Green, Grade "always told people he was descended from an officer in Napoleon's army who, after being wounded in battle, was nursed back to health by a Jewish family in Vilna, which resulted in his converting to Judaism and marrying into the family."

== War and emigration ==
When the World War II started and the Soviets left Vilnius, Grade and his wife decided to walk to Minsk, but just ten miles from Vilnius Frume-Libe realized that she wouldn't make it and returned, thinking that Germans wouldn't do anything to women and children. Both Frume-Libe and Grade's mother, Vela, were murdered.

Grade had a Soviet passport and was able to cross the border, where he was told to go to Borisov. From there, he was sent on a train to Saratov oblast, where he worked in a kolkhoz during an August harvest. Eventually he was sent to Ashgabat, Turkmenistan, where he was able to get a residency permit thanks to his Soviet passport and his membership in the Union of Soviet Writers. In May 1942, he was sent to Dushanbe, Tajikistan. In late 1943 he came to Moscow; he knew nothing about his wife and mother in Vilnius. In August 1945, he travelled back home, and spent summer and autumn there. He obtained his birth certificate in Vilnius, and thus a Polish citizenship.

Grade went back to Moscow and married Inna Hecker in 1945. She was fifteen years younger than Grade, a daughter of a Jewish father murdered by Germans, or killed in Stalin's purges. After the war, they were allowed to exit the USSR as Polish citizens. In 1946, they lived in Łódź, but after a pogrom in Kielce obtained visas and moved to Paris. In France, he was hired as a rabbi in Hénonville. The Congress for Jewish Culture in New York soon invited Grade as a speaker to a conference; on September 12, 1948, the Grades flew to New York on tourist visas.

== Postwar: life in New York ==
The Grades settled in New York, in the Bronx. They had a complicated marriage: both had affairs, but never divorced. In one letter, Grade wrote to Inna "that consciously or unconsciously your goal in life is to torture and scare me"; he also said "I have no wife, I have a child". Inna wrote about her husband that he "wasted my youth, my beauty, my strength, my genius". Grade's friend and translator, Harold Rabinowitz, described them as an "incongruous couple. He was a short, bald, squat chain-smoker, and she looked like a movie star".

Inna Grade received an MSc in literature from Columbia University. She was also a writer and a poet, though almost all her works are unpublished, as she mostly worked on translation of Grade's books into English.

Grade wrote only in Yiddish. He spoke English with a strong accent, and never lectured in it. Initially, Inna knew no Yiddish, but learned to read it later, though according to Rabinowitz she "understood Yiddish but couldn't read it". The translator Curt Leviant jokingly noted that "Inna had the wisdom of Tsar Nicholas and the knowledge of Moshe Rabbeinu—she knew Hebrew like the Tsar and read Yiddish like Moshe Rabbeinu." At home, Chaim and Inna spoke Russian.

For Grade, history was divided into two: the prewar and the postwar. The former had depth, beauty, idealism, and integrity. The latter was cheap, superficial, and cynical. There was his prewar life (including his prewar wife) in Vilna, and there was his postwar life (including his postwar wife) in America.

— David Fishman

Grade was initially reluctant to have his works translated, because he thought that most translators didn't understand the Orthodoxy and would translate his Yiddish wrong. He (likely prompted by his wife) tested Curt Leviant before he approved him to be the translator of The Yeshiva.

According to David Fishman, who knew Grade well, he could recite full passages from Gemara in 1970s. He had a low opinion of religious Jews of America and Israel, and thought that American Zionists were "manipulative politicians" that couldn't be compared with idealists of his youth. Grade's main regret was that he didn't move to Israel instead of America; he did it because he didn't want to confront his old teacher, Chazon Ish, and to disappoint him that he had become a secular man.

Abraham Bornstein was Grade's close friend and a patron; they exchanged hundreds of letters. Among Grade's friends in Israel was the third President of Israel, Zalman Shazar. Every year Lubavitcher Rebbe sent Grade matza for Pesach.

== Death and legacy ==
Grade died in 1982; Inna kept it secret, and only she and one friend attended his funeral.

While less famous than Isaac Bashevis Singer, Grade is considered a great Yiddish prose writer. Singer was called a "master of PR", while Grade was "incompetent at PR". According to Grade's editor, Ashbel Green, his novels "never sold more than 10,000 copies apiece". Nevertheless, multiple Yiddish public figures thought that he was worthy of the Nobel prize. He was praised by Elie Wiesel as "one of the great—if not the greatest—of living Yiddish novelists."

Inna Grade hated Singer and his books, calling him a "'blasphemous buffoon' who had distorted the picture of Eastern European Jewish life with 'acts of perverted sex' and unsavory characters wrestling with demons."

After Grade died, all his papers and drafts were inherited by his wife, Inna. She had a bad relationship with and a bad reputation among Yiddish literary scholars. Many scholars blamed her for Grade's obscurity: she was called "a fierce guardian of his literary legacy", and did not allow anyone to access, translate, or publish any of his books. Her protectiveness of Grade's legacy was called an "obsession", and a "fervor tantamount to obstructionism". Yiddish scholar Ruth Wisse wrote that Inna "did everything she could to make sure his reputation would die [because] she was competitive with him". She "cantankerously repulsed almost all efforts to translate or publish his work". She was also called an "eccentric and emotionally troubled widow", "a Caustic Woman Known as the ‘Black Witch’", an "angry widow", and upon her death "a sigh of relief, unkind and hard-edged, coursed through some corners of the Yiddish literary world". Leviant called her Grade's "yetzer horeh (evil inclination)".

Harold Rabinowitz recalled that Inna once "put up a Christmas tree to honor her Christian father's heritage", and invited a journalist from The Yiddish Daily Forward for an interview with Grade. When Rabinowitz heard about it, he ran out of their flat to intercept the journalist and not let him into the house. According to Rabinovitz, Inna "had an outright hostility to the Yiddish-speaking world" and that "Grade's career would have been finished if the reporter wrote that Chaim, a former student of the Ḥazon Ish — a prominent talmudic authority — had a Christmas tree in his apartment ... it was career suicide for Chaim if his core readership knew about it".

Inna died in New York City on May 2, 2010.

== Works ==
Grade is mostly known as a prose writer, but "he considered himself first and foremost a poet". Among other themes, he wrote poems about "the American landscape and the Land of Israel". He was called "Yiddish Bialik" by critics. Grade started to write prose only after emigration to America. His main literary inspirations were Dostoevsky, Balzac, and Spinoza.

Grade's postwar poetry is primarily concerned with Jewish survival in the wake of the Holocaust, and it "singled him out as a leading poet of the Holocaust".

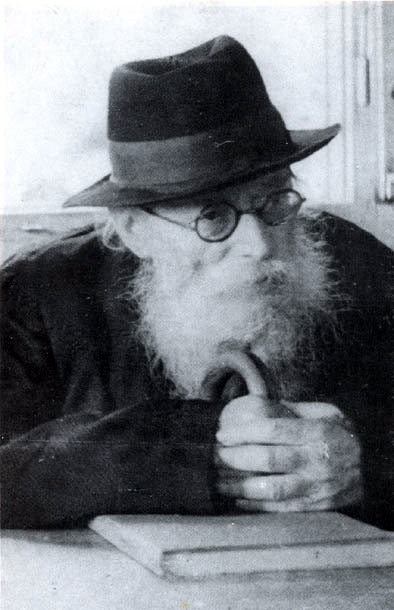
Rabbi Chazon Ish, Grade's teacher and personal hero

Grade's first prose work was a short story, "My Quarrel with Hersh Rasseyner", published in 1951 in a Labor Zionist magazine Der yidisher kemfer (The Jewish Militant). The story describes the chance meeting of a Holocaust survivor with an old friend from the mussar Novaredok Yeshiva. The narrator (Chaim Vilner, "barely fictional alter ego" of Grade (Note: Students in Novaredoker yeshivas didn't use their real last names, but nicknames based on the city of origin; "Vilner" simply means "from Vilna", and Rasseyner - "from Raseiniai". Grade used the same name in his earlier poem Musernikes, and similar name "Khaykl Vilner" in his later book, The Yeshiva.)) has lost his faith, while the friend has continued to lead a pious and devoted religious life. The former friends debate the place of religion in the postmodern world. The character Hersh Rasseyner is based on Gershon Liebman, a friend of Grade's from yeshiva who built Navardok yeshivas all over France. Grade recounted that he had a short conversation with Liebman, and created this story on what he imagined Liebman would say to him if he had the words.

All the people I've portrayed in my novels, besides the Chazon Ish, all the heroes are I myself, including the women, the cats, and even the trees.

— Chaim Grade in a letter to Abraham Bornstein, December 20, 1961

My Quarrel was first translated to English by Milton Himmelfarb, and published in 1953. The first translation was abridged and omitted one full chapter; it was retranslated in 2020 by Ruth Wisse. The story became well known in its English translation, it has been made into a film, The Quarrel, and a play. Among Yiddish readers it went unnoticed, and no one even published a review of the story. Leviant found the unabridged translation "repetitive, and a little boring", and praised Himmelfarb's translation. My Quarrel is the only Grade's work set after the Holocaust; all his novels are set in pre-war Lithuania, and never mention the war or the destruction of Jewish life. He never mentioned New York in his stories.

According to Eli Spitzer, the Quarrel "has been widely viewed as a microcosm of the battle for the modern Jewish soul, revolving around the familiar polarities of observance vs. freedom, belief vs. skepticism, and particularism vs. universalism".

Der Mames Shabosim ("My Mother's Sabbath Days"), Grade's first novel, was also published in 1951; it is "a vivid and affectionate portrait of the poor Jews from Grade's childhood courtyard".

In his major works of prose, Grade set out to reconstruct the world of prewar Jewish Vilna: street by street, one house of prayer after another, character type by character type—rabbis, businessmen and street peddlers, pious congregants and underworld criminals. His plots unfold against the backdrop of an ethnographically rich picture of prewar life, depicting the home furnishings, foods, clothing worn by men and women of different social classes, medical remedies, and local lore.
David Fishman

Grade was the first writer who focused on rabbis as main characters of novels. The portraits of rabbis from his book Der Shulhoyf was described by Jacob Glatstein as "Rembrandtian". Ruth R. Wisse called his books "the most precise evocation of the rabbinic world that existed before the war". Literary critic Adam Kirsch writes that "one might say that Grade was to the Lithuanian rabbinic establishment what Anthony Trollope was to the Church of England—a keen observer of the pride, envy, and careerism that kept clergymen hungering for advancement". Grade himself described his work as of a "gravestone carver of my vanished world".

Grade's most acclaimed novels, The Agunah (1961, tr. 1974) and The Yeshiva (2 vol., 1967–68, tr. 1976–7), deal with the philosophical and ethical dilemmas of Jewish life in prewar Lithuania. These two works were translated into English by Curt Leviant. Leviant thought that to translate Grade, a translator should know "not only Yiddish and English, but also Hebrew and Jewish"; under "Jewish", he meant knowledge of the Jewish life cycle through birth, bar mitzvah, wedding, and death, and "the basic texts of Yiddishkeit". Rabbi Saul Lieberman, a relative of Chazon Ish who also studied in Novaredoker yeshiva, was very impressed by Grade's books. He noted the realism, and told about one of the chapters of The Yeshiva that "once you have read this over and again, and understood it, you will yourself have been there, in those very yeshives".

Grade's Yiddish prose was described as "linguistic ethnography", as he wrote in vernacular Yiddish of Vilna heavily influenced by his studies in mussar yeshivas.

=== The last novel ===
Sons and Daughters is the last Grade's novel, first published in English translation in 2025; Kirsch called it "the last great Yiddish novel".

Grade started to publish it weekly in 1965 in a Yiddish newspaper Tog-Morgn Zhurnal under the title Dos alte hoyz (The Old House). After a two-year pause, he continued to publish it in 1968-1971 under the name Zin un Tekhter (Sons and Daughters). When the newspaper was closed, he continued it in Forverts, under the new name, Beys Harav (The rabbi's house). Grade died in 1982 before completing a final version of the novel. The novel remained unpublished for over four decades due to complications involving Grade's widow, who held his papers but refused to allow translation while she was alive. Following her death in 2010, the manuscript was discovered in 2014 among 20,000 books and papers from the Grades' Bronx apartment that were transferred to the YIVO Institute for Jewish Research and the National Library of Israel.

The novel, set in the interwar period in Lithuania, tells the story of Rabbi Sholem Shachne Katzenellenbogen and his five children who are "drifting away" from Orthodox Jewish traditions toward secular life, Zionism, and emigration to America. Grade's work has been compared to Dostoyevsky and Tolstoy in its scope and depth, depicting the complex religious, economic, and cultural landscape of pre-Holocaust Jewish Eastern Europe. Translated by Rose Waldman over eight years, the novel was published in English by Knopf in March 2025, with additional material discovered in 2023 that offered a glimpse of Grade's intended conclusion to the work he had abandoned in 1976.

Dwight Garner described the book as "hopelessly, miraculously, unremittingly funny", and Waldman's translation as "miraculous". Lily Meyer, in her review for The Nation, writes that "This is not a novel you read for the plot but for a world to sink into, a sprawling yarn that unspools in hugely entertaining detail, encompassing all the ingredients of life—sex, money, domesticity, religion—that we want in a realist novel." Zackary Sholem Berger praised the translation, writing that it "reads smoothly and without hiccup in English, but with all the heymishe verbiage and concepts you would expect", and "the translation worked out, like a good cholent and a lucky omen".

One of the novel's characters is Khlavneh Vilner, a semi-fictional self-portrait of Grade.

== Literary estate ==
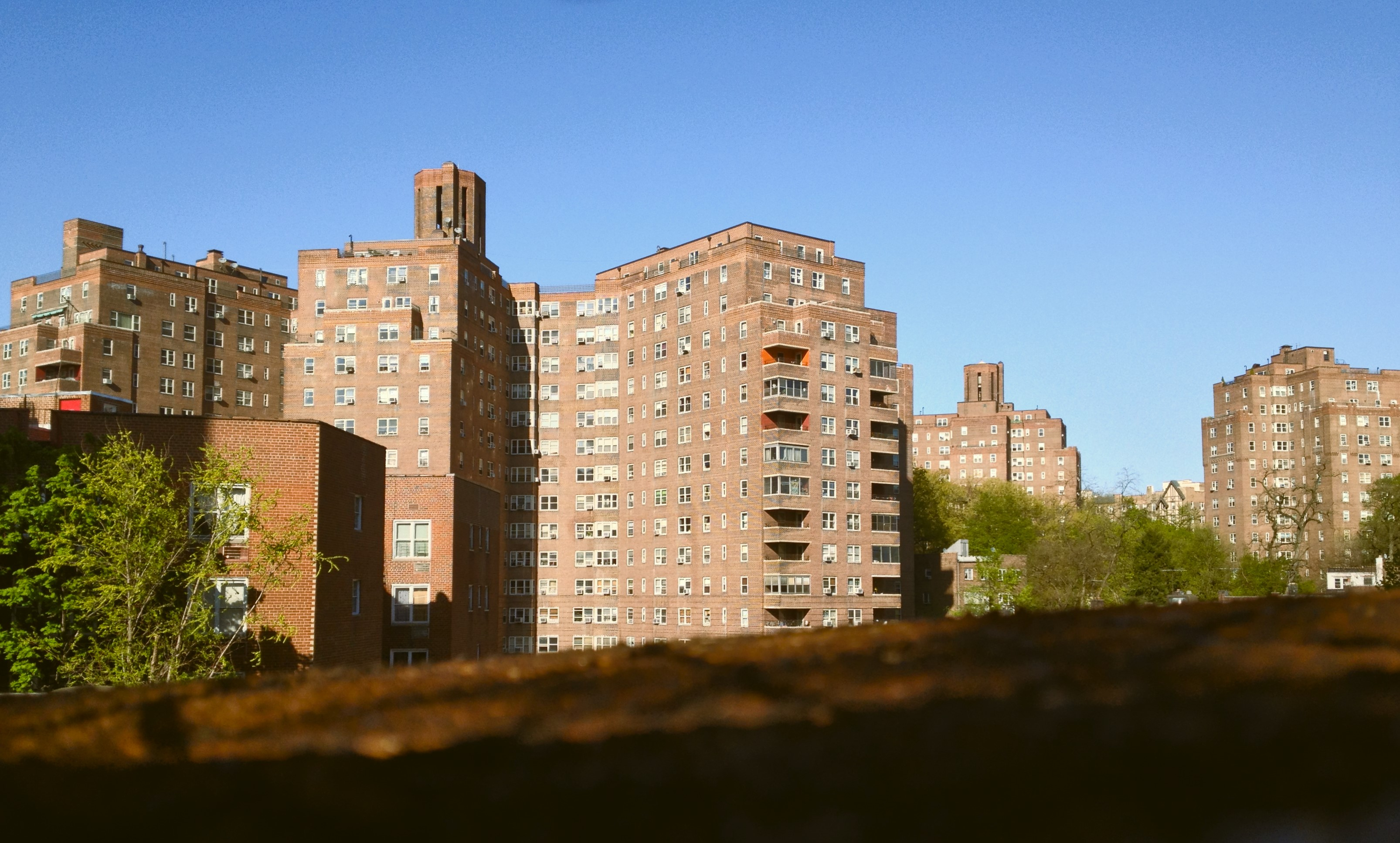
Several buildings in the Amalgamated Coop. Grades lived on a second floor of one of the buildings for many years.

Grade's papers were numerous and consumed much space of their apartment in the Amalgamated Housing Cooperative in the Northwest Bronx.

Grade's library consisted of around 20,000 books, with Talmudic commentary, Schopenhauer, Spinoza, Trollope, Joyce, and the complete works of Abraham Lincoln among them. He spent half an hour every day reshuffling the books and rereading some parts.

Inna Grade had no will and no heirs. The public administrator of Grade's papers made requests to several institutions, including Harvard University and the YIVO Institute for Jewish Research to assist in cataloging the papers. By the end of August 2010, the papers had been transferred to YIVO's offices for sorting.

In 2013 the Public Administrator of Bronx County awarded the YIVO Institute and the National Library of Israel (NLI) rights to the estate. The whole Grade's archive is stored at YIVO in New York City. YIVO and the NLI have digitized the entire archive and made it accessible online.

The Grade archive was called "probably the single most important literary acquisition in YIVO's postwar history".

== Bibliography ==
Poetry

- Yo (Yes). 1936. Includes the cycle "Ezekiel".
- Musernikes (Musarists). 1939.
- Doyres (Generations). 1945. Contains poems in Yo and Musernikes, and poems about lost family and friends.
- Oyf di khurves (On the Ruins). 1947. An elegy about his return to Vilna.
- Pleytim (Refugees). 1947. Poems composed in the Soviet Union, including "Mit dayn guf oyf mayne hent" (With Your Body in My Hands), "Kazakhstaner midber" (Kazakhstan Desert), "Tadzhikistaner harbst" (Tajikistan Autumn), and "In vaytn ashkhabad" (In Distant Ashgabat).
- Farvoksene vegn (Overgrown Paths). 1947. Includes "Geveyn fun doyres" (1936), "Dos blutike oyg" (The bloody eye, 1937), "Khurbn" (Destruction, 1938).
- Der mames tsavoe (My Mother's Will). 1949.
- Shayn fun farloshene shtern (The Glow of Extinguished Stars). 1950. Includes "Der gilgl fun ruinen" (The Gilgul of the Ruins) and "Ezekiel in Auschwitz". Translated in "The Golden Peacock: A Worldwide Treasury of Yiddish Poetry", Ed. Joseph Leftwich, 1961.
  - ייִדישע שטעטלעך פֿון פּוילן ("Jewish Towns of Poland"), translated by Julian Levinson (2020)
- Leftwich, Joseph, ed. (1974). "Sanctuaries in Ruin". An Anthology of Modern Yiddish Literature. Mouton. ISBN 9789027930019.
- Der mentsh fun fayer (The Man of Fire). 1962. Includes elegy for murdered Soviet Yiddish writers and lyrics about the American landscape. Translated in "An Anthology of Modern Yiddish Poetry", Ed. Ruth Whitman, 1966.
- Parchment Earth. 1968.
- Af mayn veg tsu dir (On My Way to You). 1969. Features impressions of the Israeli landscape.
- Talmidey khakhomim in der lite (Talmudic Scholars in Lithuania). Undated poem.

Prose

- "Mayn krig mit Hersh Raseyner" ("My Quarrel With Hersh Rasseyner") 1951. Translated in 1954 by Milton Himmelfarb (abridged), and in 2020 by Ruth Wisse.
- Der mames shabosim, 1955. Translated, My Mother's Sabbath Days, New York: Knopf, 1986. ISBN 0-394-50980-3. Portion republished in The Seven Little Lanes. New York: Bergen Belsen Memorial Press, 1972, which contains the texts "On strange soil," "The seven lanes of the Vilna ghetto," and the story "My quarrel with Hersh Rasseyner."
- Der shulhoyf 1958. Includes Reb Nokhemel der Malve, Shrifrele, and Der brunem. Translated, The Well, Philadelphia: JPS, 1967.
- Di agune 1961. Translated, The Agunah, New York: Twayne Publishers, 1974. ISBN 0-672-51954-2, translated by Curt Leviant
- Yerusholaim shel male un yerusholaim shel mate (Jerusalem on High and Low). 1964.
- Tsemakh Atlas (2 volumes) 1967-68. Translated, The Yeshiva, Indianapolis: Bobbs-Merrill, 1976-77. ISBN 0-672-52344-2, translated by Curt Leviant
- Froyen fun geto (Women of the Ghetto) c. 1960's. Serialized, published in Forverts.
- Di kloyz un di gas (The Kloyz and the Street) 1974. Translated, Rabbis and Wives, New York: Knopf, 1982. ISBN 0-8052-0840-2, translated by Harold Rabinowitz (Republished as The Sacred and The Profane). Contains three short novellas: "The Rebbetzin", "Laybe-Layzar's Courtyard", and "The Oath". The fourth story, Zeydes un eyneklekh ("Grandfathers and Grandchildren"), was translated in Have I Got a Story for You: More Than a Century of Fiction from the Forward, New York: W.W. Norton, 2016. ISBN 978-0393062700
- Der shtumer minyen (The Silent Minyan) 1976. Short stories. Untranslated. Excerpt translated as "The Abandoned Sanctuary" for Yiddish Book Center.
- Beys harov (The Rabbi's House) c. 1960's-70's. Serialized, published in Der Tog and Forverts. Translated to English as Sons and Daughters by Rose Waldman, published in 2025
- Fun unter der erd (From Under the Earth) c. 1980-82. Uncompleted serialized novel published in Forverts.

== Awards ==
- 1950: Bimko Prize from the Congress for Jewish Culture for Der Mames Tsavoe
- 1956: Louis Lamed Prize for Der Mames Shabosim
- 1967: a "citation" and a prize from the American Academy for Jewish Research
- 1967: National Jewish Book Award for The Well
- 1969: Remembrance Award from the Association of Bergen Belsen Concentration Camp Survivors
- 1970: Leivick Prize from the Cultural Congress
- 1970: the Itzik Manger Prize for contributions to Yiddish letters
- 1978: National Jewish Book Award for The Yeshiva
