= Lamed Shapiro =

Yiddish-language author (1878–1948)

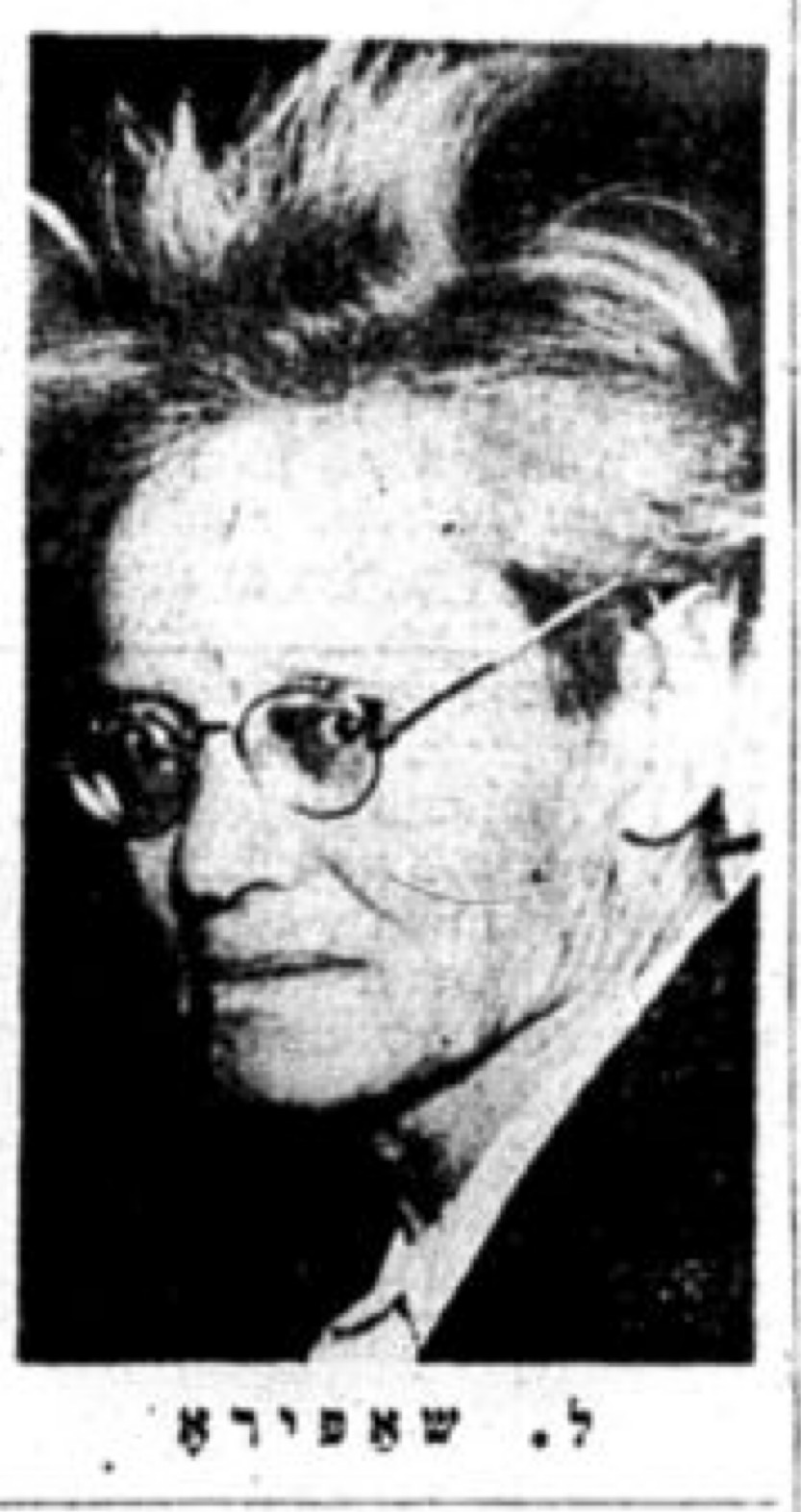
- Born: Levi Yehoshua Shapiro; March 10, 1878; Rzhyshchiv, Ukraine
- Died: 1948 (aged 69–70); Los Angeles, California, US

Levi Yehoshua Shapiro (Yiddish: ל. שאַפּיראָ: March 10, 1878 – 1948), known as "Lamed Shapiro", (lamed is the Hebrew name of the letter ל), was a Ukrainian-born American Yiddish author. His stories are best known for such themes as murder, rape and cannibalism.

== Biography ==
He was born on March 10, 1878, in Rzhyshchiv. In 1896, he traveled to Warsaw, struggled to work for two years, then returned to Ukraine. He experienced a pogrom, fell in love and attempted suicide, and was later conscripted into the Imperial Russian Army. These experiences would influence much of his rather dark, fictional themes. Shapiro returned to Warsaw in 1903, and I. L. Peretz helped him publish his first literary works: Di Fligl ("The Wings"); and, the next year, a longer story called Itsikl Mamzer ("Little Isaac the Bastard"), published in a journal edited by Avrom Reyzen. To Peretz he would dedicate one of his works, Smoke, a tale of the Old World. (Peretz would serve as an early benefactor of another famous Yiddish writer, Der Nister.)

Shapiro left for America in 1905. He stayed for a year in London, where he befriended the Hebrew writer Yosef Haim Brenner. After arriving in New York in 1906, and working for The Forward, he began publishing his gruesome pogrom tales: "The Kiss" (1907); "Pour Out Thy Wrath" (1908); "The Cross" (1909); "In The Dead Town" (1910). Shapiro's work marks a break from that of the three classic Yiddish writers in its foregrounding of violence and psychological realism, rather than satirical commentary. Shapiro subsequently returned to Warsaw for a year, then returned permanently to the United States in 1911. By 1919, Shapiro had written what are considered his two greatest pogrom stories: "White Challah" and "The Jewish Government." The two stories "remain some of the most aesthetically nuanced and psychologically complex treatments of the pogrom theme in modern Jewish literature."

Shapiro and his family moved to Los Angeles in 1921. His wife, Freydl, died there in 1927, and he then returned to New York. Back in New York yet again, Shapiro worked at several literary periodicals, was active in the Communist Party, and was employed by the Federal Writers' Project in 1937. Shapiro returned to LA in 1939, where he lived at 544 Heliotrope Drive in East Hollywood.

== Death ==
Shapiro died in Los Angeles in 1948, aged 69 or 70, while living in a friend's garage. He died an alcoholic and poor. He was buried at the Mount Zion Cemetery in East Los Angeles next to his wife and his tombstone was inscribed with the words: "Lamed Levi Shapiro, Author of the Yiddishe Melukhe".

== Works ==
- Afn yam (At the Sea), 1910
- Novelen (Novellas), 1910
- Di yidishe melukhe un andere zakhn (The Jewish Government and Other Things), 1919 This collection includes some of Shapiro’s pogrom stories, such as White Challah and The Cross, which depict extreme violence, psychological trauma, and the breakdown of moral order.
- Nyu-yorkish un andere zakhn (New York and Other Things), 1931
- Fun korbn minkhe (From the Afternoon Offering), 1941
- Der shrayber geyt in kheyder (The Writer Goes to School), 1945
- Der Amerikaner Shed (The American Demon), an unfinished novel
- Ksuvim (Works), 1949

In English translation

- The Cross and Other Jewish Stories. New Haven: Yale University Press, 2007. Edited and with an introduction by Leah Garrett. ISBN 9781480440807
- The Jewish Government and Other Stories, edited and translated by Curt Leviant, 1971

== Critical discourse ==
Curt Leviant, noted translator of Yiddish literature and a novelist in his own right, wrote his MA thesis on Shapiro: “Lamed Shapiro: Master Craftsman of the Yiddish Short Stories”, Columbia University, 1957.

David G. Roskies, professor of Yiddish literature at Jewish Theological Seminary of America, has done critical work on Lamed Shapiro, and places him in the context of World War I-era Jewish writers like Isaac Babel.

== Notes ==
=== References ===
- Becerra, Hector (March 28, 2013). "Jewish dead lie forgotten in East L.A. graves". Los Angeles Times.
- Cohen, Joshua (May 4, 2007). "An Offering to the Priests of Yiddish". The Forward. Review of Lamed Shapiro, The Cross and Other Jewish Stories.
- Hoffman, Matthew (2002). "Shapiro, (Levi Joshua) Lamed." In: Sorrel Kerbel, et al. (Eds.), Jewish Writers of the Twentieth Century. New York: Fitzroy Dearborn. pp. 984–987. ISBN 0203010000.
- "Lamed Shapiro" [author biography] (2001). In: Jules Chametzky, et al. (Eds.). Jewish American Literature: A Norton Anthology. New York: Norton. pp. 154–155.
