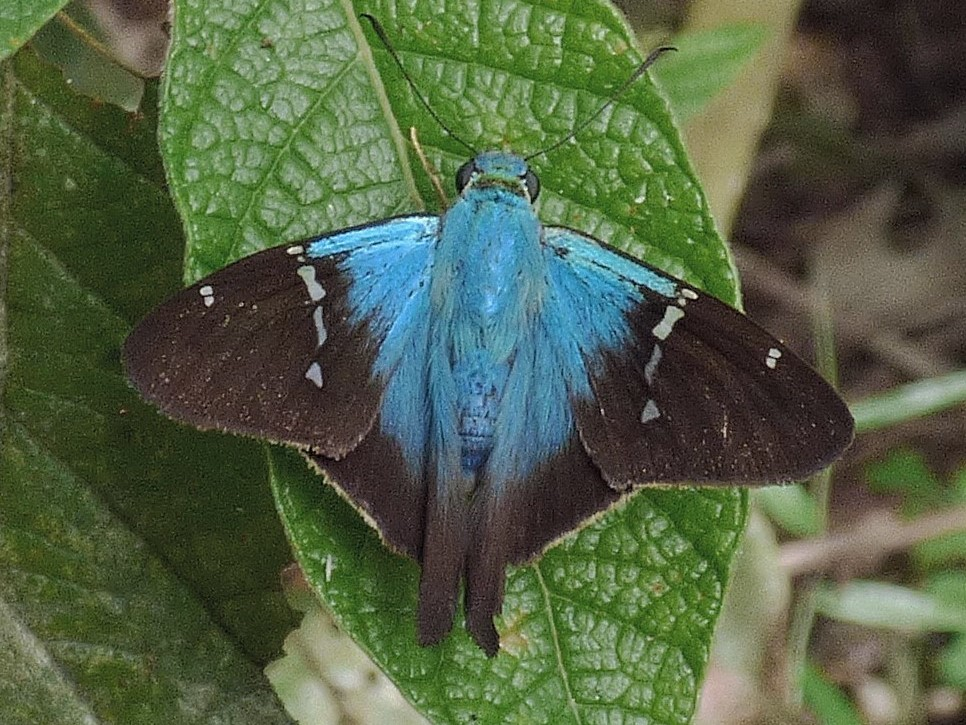
- Aguna glaphyrus

Scientific classification
- Kingdom: Animalia
- Phylum: Arthropoda
- Class: Insecta
- Order: Lepidoptera
- Family: Hesperiidae
- Subfamily: Eudaminae
- Genus: Aguna; Williams, 1927

Synonyms
- Tmetocerus Poujade, 1895

= Aguna (butterfly) =

Genus of butterflies

Aguna is a genus of Neotropical skipper butterflies in the family Hesperiidae (Eudaminae).

== Species ==
The following species are recognised in the genus Aguna:

- Aguna albistria (Plötz, 1880)
  - A. albistria albistria (Mabille, 1888) – Brazil
  - A. albistria leucogramma (Mabille, 1888) – southeast Mexico to Colombia and Venezuela (Suriname?)
- Aguna asander (Hewitson, 1867) – gold-spotted aguna – type locality Brazil
  - A. asander asander (Hewitson, 1867) – southern U.S. (as stray) to Argentina
  - A. asander haitensis (Mabille & Boullet, 1912) – Cuba and Hispaniola
  - A. asander jasper Evans, 1952 – Jamaica
- Aguna aurunce Hewitson, 1867 – type locality Brazil
  - A. aurunce aurunce (Plötz, 1880)
  - A. aurunce hypozonius (Plötz, 1880) – south east Mexico to Venezuela
- Aguna camagura (R. Williams, 1926) – type locality Brazil
- Aguna cirrus Evans, 1952 – type locality Brazil
- Aguna claxon Evans, 1952 – emerald aguna – Cuba, southern Texas to Colombia and Suriname
- Aguna clina Evans, 1952 – type locality Colombia
- Aguna coeloides Austin & O. Mielke, 1998 – southeastern Mexico to southern Brazil
- Aguna coelus (Stoll, 1781) – Stoll's aguna – Costa Rica and Panama to Peru and central Brazil
- Aguna ganna (Möschler, 1879) – Ganna aguna – Costa Rica to Colombia and Venezuela
- Aguna glaphyrus (Mabille, 1888) – type locality Brazil
- Aguna latifascia Austin & O. Mielke, 1998 – type locality Ecuador
- Aguna latimacula Austin & O. Mielke, 1998 – type locality Brazil
- Aguna longicauda Austin & O. Mielke, 1998 – type locality Brazil
- Aguna megaeles (Mabille, 1888)
  - A. megaeles malia Evans, 1952 – type locality Venezuela
  - A. megaeles megaeles (Mabille, 1888) – type locality Brazil
- Aguna mesodentata Austin & O. Mielke, 1998 – type locality Brazil
- Aguna metophis (Latreille, [1824]) – long-tailed aguna – south Texas to south Brazil
- Aguna nicolayi Austin & O. Mielke, 1998 – type locality Brazil
- Aguna panama Austin & O. Mielke, 1998 – Panamanian aguna – Honduras to Venezuela
- Aguna parva Austin & O. Mielke, 1998 – type locality Brazil
- Aguna penicillata Austin & O. Mielke, 1998 – type locality Brazil
- Aguna prasinus Siewert, Leviski, O. Mielke & Casagrande, 2015
- Aguna similis Austin & O. Mielke, 1998 – type locality Brazil
- Aguna spatulata Austin & O. Mielke, 1998 – type locality Brazil
- Aguna spicata Austin & O. Mielke, 1998 – type locality Brazil
- Aguna squamalba Austin & O. Mielke, 1998 – type locality Brazil
- Aguna venezuelae O. Mielke, 1971 – type locality Venezuela
