= Curt Leviant =

Novelist, translator, and professor of Jewish studies

- Born: 1932 (age 93–94); Vienna, Austria
- Occupations: Author, Translator, Professor
- Writing career
- Notable works: The Yemenite Girl; The Man Who Thought He Was Messiah

Curt Leviant (born 1932, Vienna) is a retired Jewish Studies professor, as well as a novelist and translator.

== Personal life and career ==
His parents were Jacques and Fenia Leviant. They spoke Yiddish at home, and encouraged their son's interest in Yiddish literature and theater.

He came to the United States in 1938. He took a BA from CUNY (Brooklyn), followed in 1957 by an MA from Columbia, with a thesis on Lamed Shapiro. From 1960, he taught Hebraic studies at Rutgers, taking a PhD there in 1966 with a doctoral thesis that was a translation with commentary, published in 1969 as King Artur: A Hebrew Authurian Romance of 1279.

He married Erika Leah Pfeifer, they had three daughters, Dalya, Dvora, Shulamit.

Leviant was also a book reviewer, usually of Jewish authors, with reviews appearing in The New York Times, The Nation, and other publications, especially Jewish media. In more recent years, he has been, co-authoring with his wife, a Jewish travel writer.

According to Lewis Fried, "his fiction is nuanced, surprising, and often arabesque, dealing with the demands of the present and the claims of the past."

== Novels ==
- The Yemenite Girl. Bobbs-Merrill, 1977; Avon/Bard Books, 1978; Syracuse University Press, 1999
  - expansion of a 1973 short story of the same title, published in The Literary Review, Fall 1973.
  - winner of the Edward Lewis Wallant Award
- Passion in the Desert Avon/Bard Books, 1980
- The Man Who Thought He Was Messiah. Jewish Publication Society, 1990
- Partita in Venice. Livingston Press, 1999
- Diary of an Adulterous Woman: A Novel: Including an ABC Dictionary That Offers Alphabetical Tidbits and Surprises. Syracuse University Press, 2001
- A Novel of Klass. Livingston, 2008
- Kafka's Son. Dzanc Books, 2016
- Katz or Cats, or How Jesus Became my Rival in Love. Dzanc Books, 2018

== Shorter fiction ==
- Ladies and Gentlemen, the Original Music of the Hebrew Alphabet and Weekend in Mustara: Two Novellas. University of Wisconsin Press, 2002
- Zix Zexy Ztories. Texas Tech University Press, 2012

== Translations ==
Leviant has translated from Hebrew and Yiddish to English, including:

- The Yeshiva, by Chaim Grade.
- The Agunah, by Chaim Grade.
- More Stories from my Father's Court, by Isaac Bashevis Singer.
- Stories and Satires, by Sholom Aleichem.
- Old Country Tales, by Sholom Aleichem.
- From the Fair, by Sholom Aleichem.
- The Jewish Government and Other Stories, by Lamed Shapiro.
- The Heart-stirring Sermon and other Stories, by Abraham Reisen.
- The Golem and the Wondrous Deeds of the Maharal of Prague, by Yudl Rosenberg (New Haven: Yale University Press, 2007).
