= Peretz Miransky =

Yiddish poet and fabulist

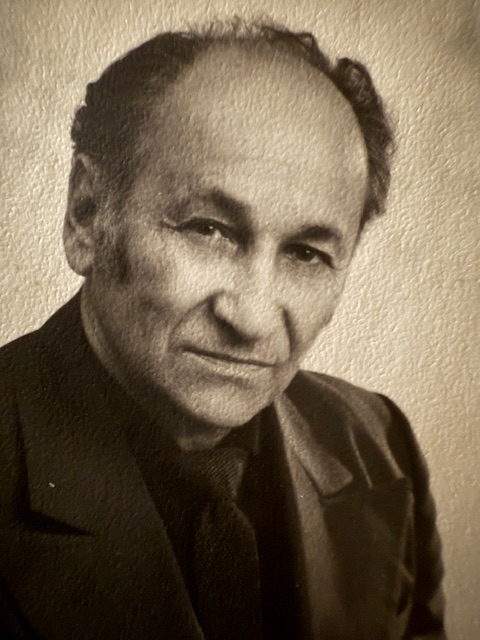
Peretz Miransky (author)

Peretz Miransky (born March 24, 1908 – July 10, 1993) was a Yiddish poet and fabulist. He was invited to join the Yiddish literary group Yung-Vilne in 1934, becoming its youngest member. He is known in the Yiddish literary world as a writer of fables, the artistic form in which he made his debut as a writer.

== Early life ==
Miransky lived with his family in Shnipishok, a suburb of Vilna between 1924 and 1935. He was the third eldest of six siblings, only one of whom, a sister, survived the Holocaust. Inspired by a teacher, Moshe Kulbak, Miransky started to write poetry. His other major influence was Eliezer Shteynbarg, whose work inspired him to write fables. He made his literary debut as a writer of fables on February 2, 1934, first in the Yiddish newspaper the Vilner tog (Vilna Day) and later in the literary journals and newspapers in the surrounding cities and towns of Poland.

== Life During World War II ==
When Russia, then occupying Vilna, transferred it to Lithuania in October 1938, Miransky moved to Vidzy, Poland. He married there and had a child, neither of whom survived the Holocaust. Miransky returned to Vilna when it was once again under Russian control. When the Nazi army approached Vilna in June 1941, Miransky fled Vilna and crossed the border into Russia. He survived the war years in Samarkand, Uzbekistan, where he met and married Leah (Lola) Bluds.

== Post-War Years ==
Miransky returned to Soviet occupied Vilna in 1944 to search for surviving family members. He and his wife Leah reached Templehof, (Berlin) displaced person's camp in 1946, where their eldest daughter Libi was born (December 13, 1946). Miransky was culturally active in Templehof co-editing the journal Unzer Lebn (Our Life). In 1948 the family arrived in Paris, France, there awaiting immigration papers to Canada. The Miransky's second daughter Khane (Anna) was born (October 12, 1948) at sea. Peretz Miransky and his family lived in Montreal from 1949 to 1955, where their third child Rami was born (June 29, 1955). In 1955 the Miransky family moved to Toronto. Miransky's wife Leah died in 1970. Miransky married Saba Fried in 1976.

Miransky's first book A Likht far a groshn was published in Montreal in 1951. Most of the poems and fables in this book were written before and during World War II and reconstructed from memory.

== Works ==
- A likht far a groshn (A Candle for a Penny), Montreal, 1951
- Shures shire, lider un mesholim (Lines of Song; poems and fables), Israel, 1974
- Tvishn shmeykhl un trer, mesholim (Between Smile and Tears, fables), Toronto, 1979
- Nit derzogt, lider (Incompletely Expressed; poems), Tel Aviv,1983
- A zemer fun demer, lider un mesholim (A Song from the Twilight; poems and fables), Toronto, 1991

Miransky's poetry and fables were also widely published in the Yiddish press and in literary journals including the Keneder Odler, (Canadian Eagle) Goldene Keyt, (Golden Chain), Svive,(Neighbourhood) Tsukunft,(Future) Afn Shvel,(On the Threshold) Yidishe Kultur (Yiddi sh Culture) and the Forverts (Forward).

His writing has been published in translation most recently in a bilingual English- Yiddish edition: Peretz Miransky, selected poems and fables (ed. Anna Miransky 2000). His poetry and fables have been set to music, found in Marilyn Lerner and David Wall's Still Soft Voiced Heart: New Yiddish Lieder (2002) and the Flying Bulgar's Klezmer Band's Sweet Return (2003).

== Awards ==
- Canadian Jewish Book Awards: A zemer fun demer. 1992 Itzik Manger Prize, Nit derzogt, 1988
- National Jewish Book Award, Tvshn smeykhl un trer, 1980

== Bibliography ==
- C.L. Fuks, Hundert Yor Yidish un Hebreyishe Literatur in Kanada. (1962) 164–65
- S. Niger et al., (eds.), Leksikon fun der Nayer Yidisher Literatur, vol. 5 (1956–81), 669;
- “Peretz Miransky,” in: M. Ravitch, Mayn Leksikon: Yidishe Shraybers, Kintslers, Aktiom, ovkh Klaltuers in di Amerikes un Andere Lender, vol. 6, book 2 (1982), 108- 10.{Rebecca Margolis (2nd ed.)}
- A.Miransky, Poem by Poem, Fable by Fable, Discovering My Father and Learning His Language (2024)
