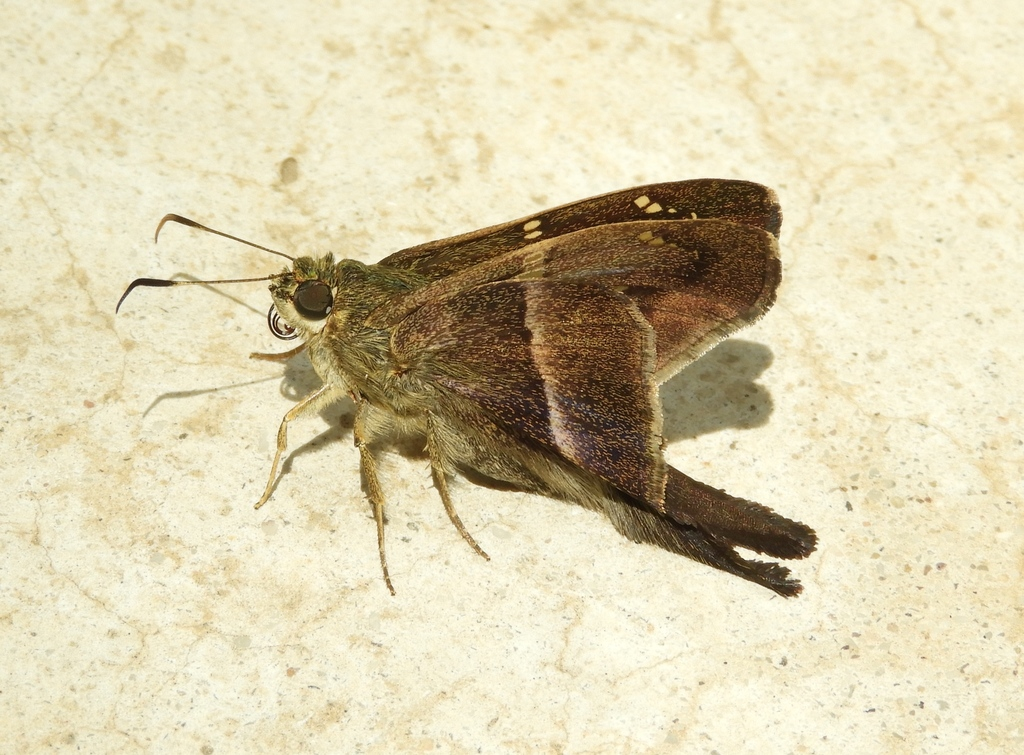

Scientific classification
- Kingdom: Animalia
- Phylum: Arthropoda
- Class: Insecta
- Order: Lepidoptera
- Family: Hesperiidae
- Genus: Aguna
- Species: A. metophis

Binomial name
- Aguna metophis (Latreille, 1824)

= Aguna metophis =

Species of butterfly

Aguna metophis, the tailed aguna, is a species of dicot skipper in the butterfly family Hesperiidae. It is found in Central America, North America, and South America.
