= The Agunah =

1974 translation of the 1961 Yiddish novel Di Agune

- First English edition cover
- Author: Chaim Grade
- Original title: די עגונה
- Translator: Curt Leviant
- Cover artist: Bill Tinker
- Language: Yiddish
- Published: 1961 (יידיש־נאַציאָנאַלן אַרבעטער־פאַרבאַנד) (Yiddish); 1974 (Twayne Publishers, distributed by Bobbs-Merrill) (English)
- Pages: 265
- ISBN: 978-0-672-51954-3

The Agunah is a 1974 English translation by Curt Leviant of the 1961 Yiddish novel Di Agune (די עגונה) by Chaim Grade. It was also published in a 1962 Hebrew translation, Ha-Agunah (העגונה).

The novel is set in the Jewish part of Vilna, Lithuania, around 1930. It concerns a woman whose husband was missing in action during the First World War, and who was thus an agunah, a woman who could not remarry according to Jewish law. The woman in the novel is not interested in remarrying, but eventually, between pressure from her family and to escape an obnoxious suitor, she accepts the marriage proposal of a minor acquaintance. They find a maverick rabbi who is willing to grant permission, and the two marry in secret and move to a part of Vilna where nobody knows them. But the secret comes out, and the resulting controversy, fanned by the obnoxious suitor, sends the community into a tumult.

== Reception ==
Who is right, who is wrong? Grade offers no judgments, no pronouncements.

— Elie Wiesel, The New York Times

Grade's gift is not for fiction but argument.

— Mark Jay Mirsky, The Washington Post

One may say that the very essence of the novel is tragedy, though not that of the agunah alone.

— Lester A. Segal, Judaism

It is wry yet alarming insight into what happens when a community is divided over religion and religious interpretation.

— Hilary Daninhirsch, The Jewish Chronicle (Pittsburgh)
