= Rachel Suckever =

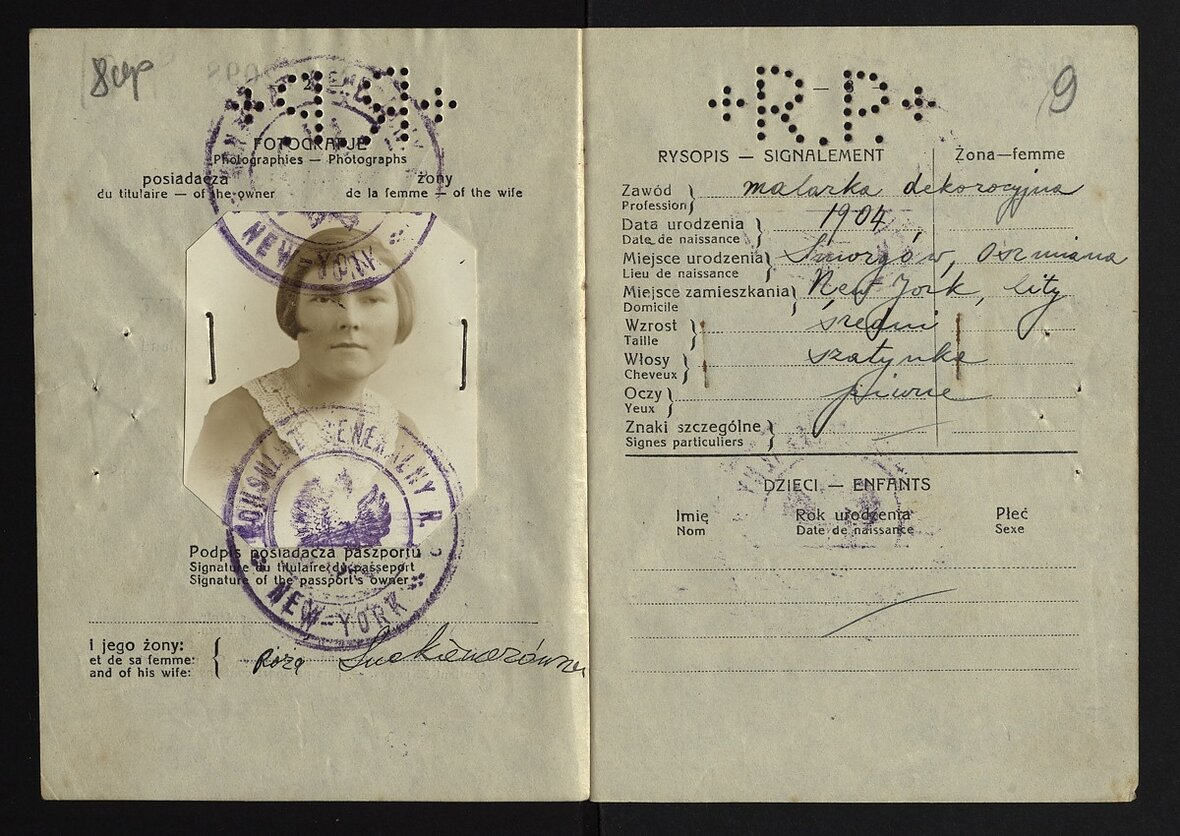
- Suckever's foreign passport, issued by the Polish Consulate in New York, 1929
- Born: November 2, 1904; Smarhon, Minsk Governorate, Russian Empire
- Died: 1943 (aged 38–39) or 1944 (aged 39–40); Treblinka or Maidanek death camps
- Other name: Roza Suckever
- Citizenship: Poland
- Occupation: Artist
- Movement: Yung-Vilne

Rachel Suckever (Note: Her first name can also be written as Rachela, Rachele, Rokhl, or Roza; her last name as Suckewer, Suckewerówna, Suckiewer, last name after marriage - Suckever-Ušajeva/Uszajewa) (2 November 1904 – 1943 or 1944) was a Jewish painter active in interwar Vilnius. A member of the modernist Yiddish arts collective Yung-Vilne (Young Vilna), she was murdered during the Holocaust, having spent her final years documenting fellow prisoners in the Vilnius Ghetto.

== Early life ==
Suckever was born in a Jewish family in Smarhon, Minsk Governorate, Russian Empire (now in Belarus), and had a younger sister, Chaya. During the First World War her family was deported into the Russian interior. They spent the war years in Siberia and, afterward, settled in Vilna by 1922. They lived in the old Jewish quarter of the city; the family was poor. At some point she adopted the more modern name Roza in place of Rachel, a change art historian Giedrė Jankevičiūtė reads as a deliberate break from religious tradition, alongside a developing interest in left-wing politics.

== Education and career ==
Suckever studied at a Jewish gymnasium while also attending the drawing school of the Polish artists' society in Vilna. In 1925, she enrolled as a non-matriculated student in the Faculty of Fine Arts at Stefan Batory University. Between 1928 and 1930 she traveled to New York with her father, Naum Suckever, working as a hotel maid while continuing to paint.

In 1930, she created "Strike at an American Port", a composition that provoked debate in the Jewish and Polish press when shown at an exhibition marking the tenth anniversary of the YIVO institute. The original is lost, only a 1936 reproduction survived. The painting was described as "a unique example of the influence of American and, through it, Mexican art on the art of the 1930s in Poland."

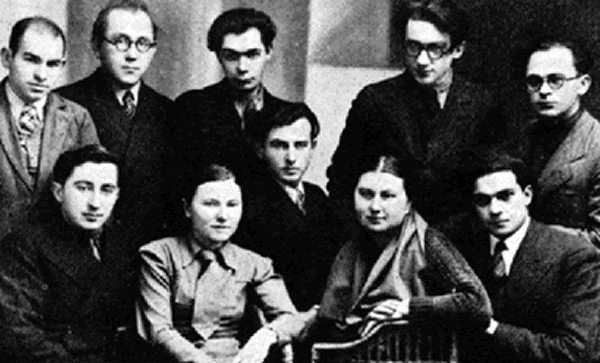
Yung-Vilne. Suckewer is second from right

Back in Vilnius she resumed her studies under Ludomir Sleńdziński, one of the city's most influential painters, and joined Yung-Vilne, an artistic group that included poets Chaim Grade and Abraham Sutzkever and artists such as Sheyne Efron. (Sutzkever later noted that he and Roza were not related, or only very distantly.) She also designed covers for poetry collections of her fellow group members: Elkhonen Vogler and Leizer Volf.

In 1938, she organized her personal exhibition in Vilnia, and, in 1940, was the only woman and only Jew on the organizing committee of a Vilnius artists' exhibition.

In 1933, she married hat maker Kalman Ušajevus.

== Live in Vilnius ghetto and death ==
Suckever survived the mass killings of 1941 and lived in the Vilna Ghetto from early 1942, working as an auxiliary laborer (Hilfsarbeiterin) at the German Feldkommandantur. She painted portraits and landscapes on German commission in exchange for food and managed to save art materials. With these she documented ghetto life, favoring portraits over everyday scenes, most notably several likenesses of the teacher, composer, and choir conductor Jakub Gerstein, used at his memorial services. She also produced a calligraphed, watercolored rendering of Avrom Sutzkever's ghetto poem Un azoy zolstu redn tsum yosem ("Say This to the Orphan"). She was among the ghetto prisoners conscripted to build a large-scale scale model of Vilnius (Plastiker Plan Vilna) for the German administration; none of the artists on that project survived.

As the ghetto was liquidated, prisoners were sorted for labor camps or death camps. Suckever chose to stay with her mother and sister Chaya; the three are believed to have been killed in Treblinka or in Maidanek, in 1943 or 1944. Her exact date of death is unknown.

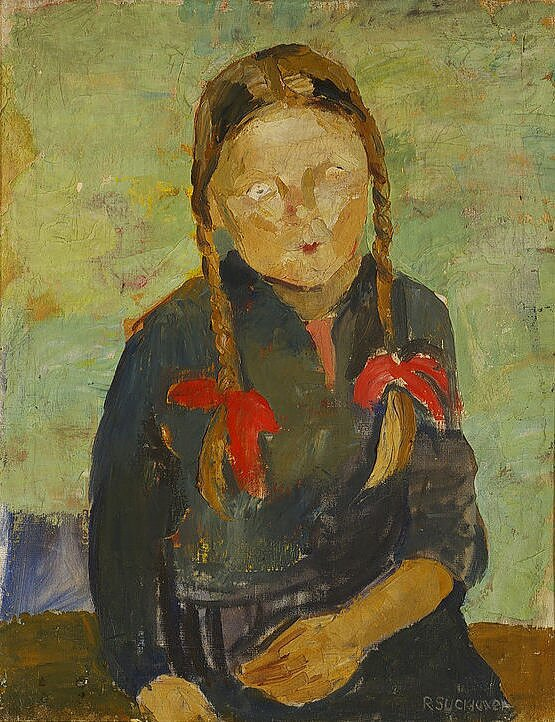
Girl, 1935

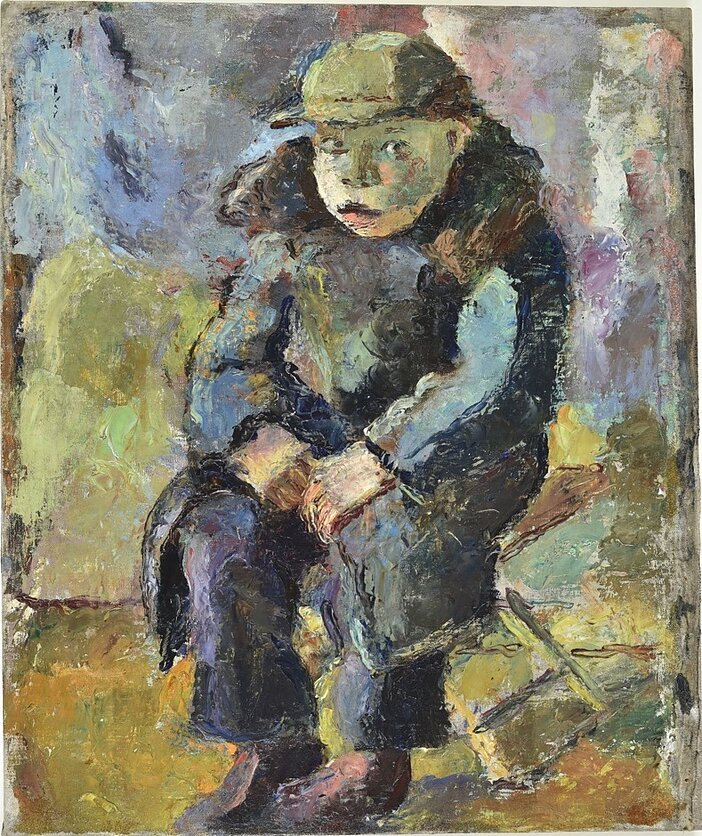
The Homeless Boy, 1935

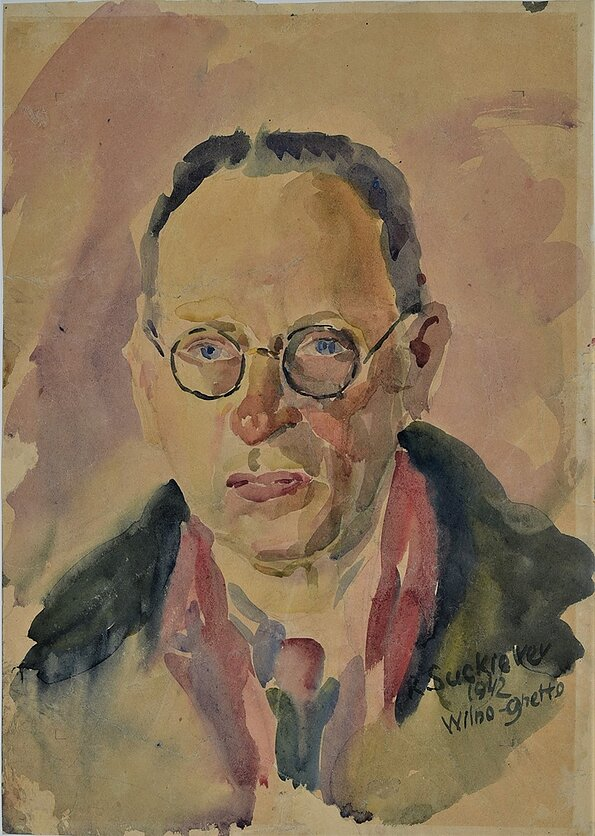
Portrait of Conductor Abraham Sleps, 1942

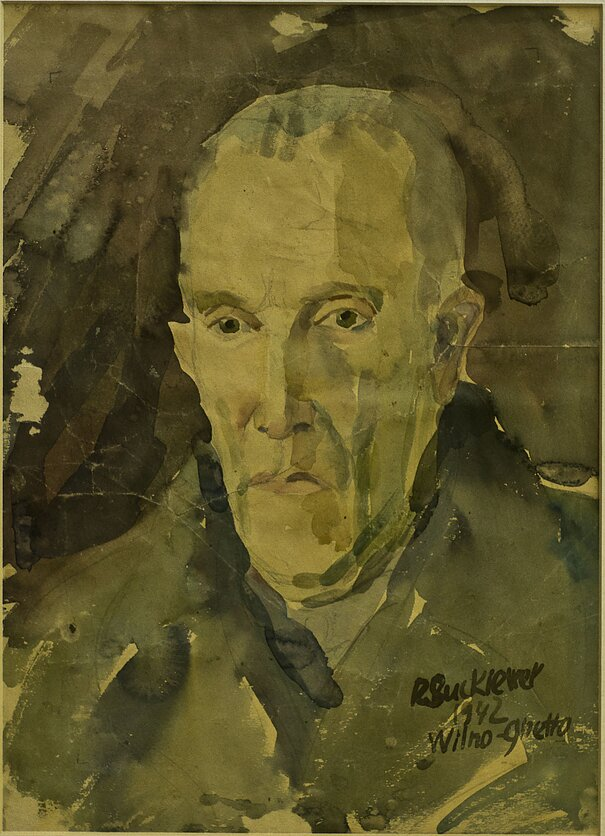
Portrait of a Ghetto Prisoner, 1942

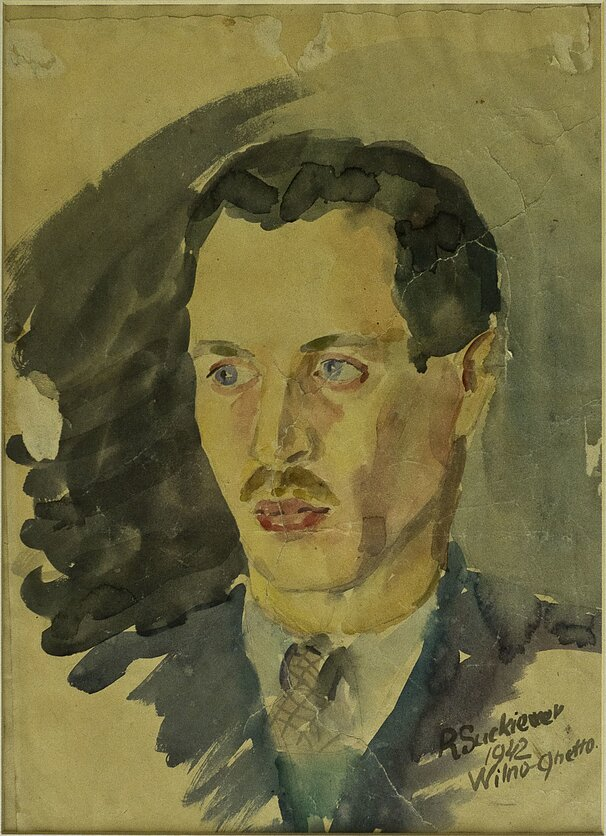
Portrait of a Ghetto Prisoner, 1942

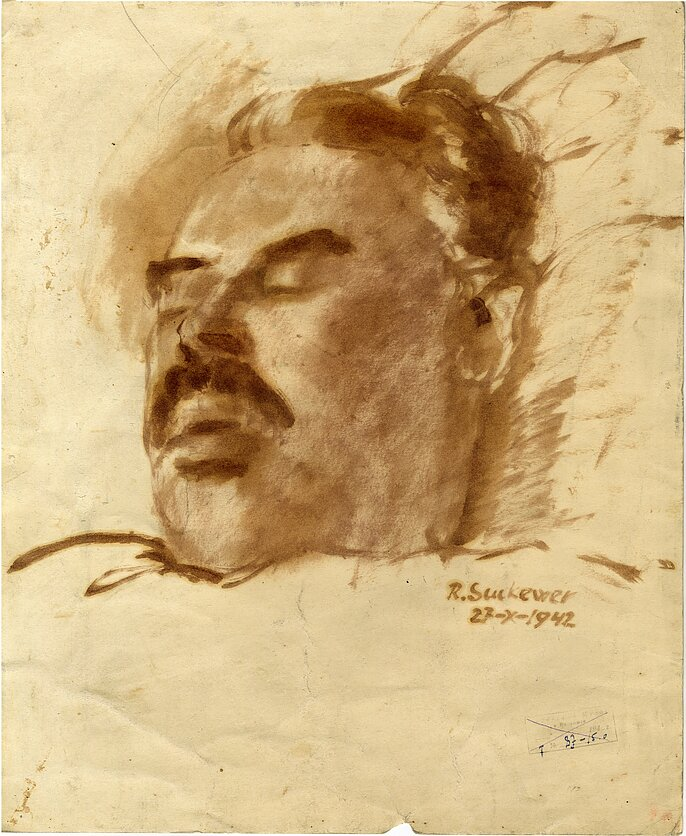
Portrait of Jacob Gerstein, 1942

== Legacy ==
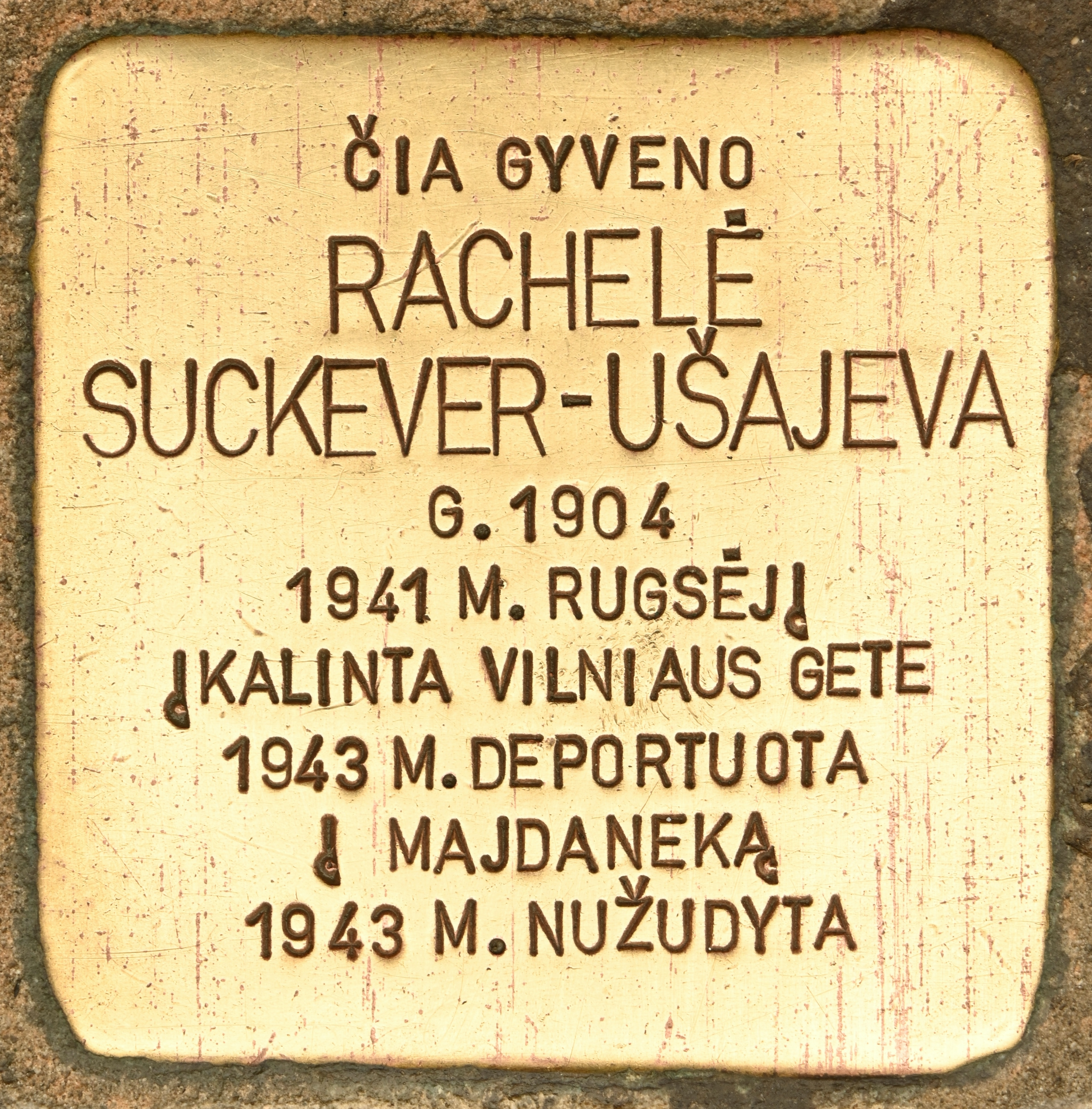
Stolperstein for Suckever in Vilnius

Few works of Suckever survive. During her studies she worked in an art deco–inflected, neoclassical style influenced by Sleńdziński, but then moved toward expressionism. This later phase is represented by the surviving pre-war paintings Homeless Boy and Girl (both 1935), which were hidden in the ghetto, recovered after the war, and given to the Jewish museum founded in Vilnius in 1946. When that museum was liquidated in 1949 during Stalin-era antisemitic campaigns, her ghetto portraits were reclassified as documents rather than art and dispersed; her surviving works were later reunited at the Vilna Gaon State Jewish Museum.

A Stolperstein for Suckever was installed in Vilnius in 2022.
