= Vilensky =

Vilensky/Wilensky is a Jewish surname, meaning "from Vilna".

- Esther Vilenska, Israeli politician
- Harold Wilensky, American sociologist
- Konstanty Wileński, Soviet musician
- Moshe Wilenski, Polish-born Israeli composer
- Vladimir Dmitrievich Vilensky-Sibiryakov also referred to as V. D. Vilensky
- Zev Vilnay, born Volf Vilensky, Israeli geographer
- Zinovy Vilensky, Soviet sculptor
