= Yung-Vilne =

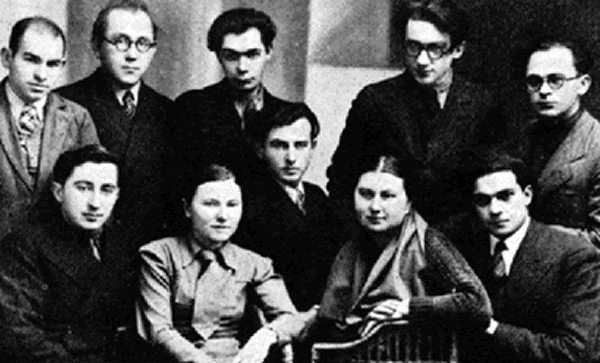
Artists of Yung-Vilne. From the right: Shmerke Kaczerginski, Abraham Sutzkever, Elchanan Wogler, Chaim Grade, Leyzer Volf, sitting: Mosze Lewin, Szejna Efron, Szymszon Kahan, Rachel Suckever, and Bencijon Michtom

Yung-Vilne (Yiddish: יונג-ווילנע, Young Vilna) was a Yiddish literary collective active in Vilna (now Vilnius, Lithuania) in the 1930s.

== Origins and members ==
The group's unofficial beginnings can be traced to 1927, when a local art exhibition titled "From the Synagogue Courtyard to Glazier's Street" inspired young writers and artists to capture Vilna's Jewish cultural landscape. Early gatherings were modest and informal, often held in the kitchens of members like Shloyme Belis, Shimshon Kahan, and Bentsye (Bencion) Mikhtom. These initial meetings allowed participants to share poetry, display artwork, and discuss artistic and ideological issues.

The group was formally established on October 11, 1929, through an announcement by Zalmen Reyzen in the Vilner tog newspaper.

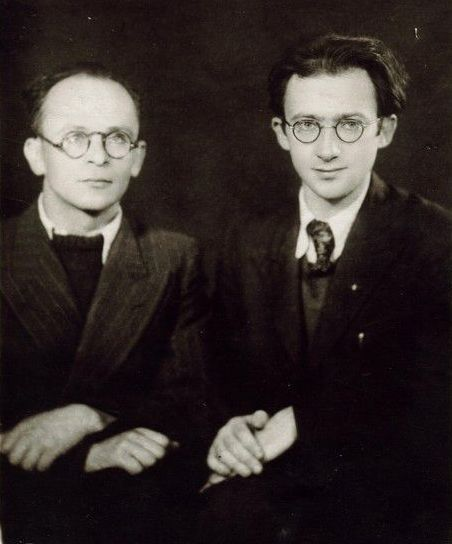
Shmerke Kaczerginski (left) and Abraham Sutzkever (right) in 1930s

There was no official list of group members; among the best-known members are poets Chaim Grade, Szymszon Kahan, Perets Miranski, Avrom Sutzkever, Elchanan Wogler, and Leyzer Volf; prose writers Shmerke Kaczerginski and Moyshe Levin (Ber Sarin); and artists Bencijon Michtom, Rachel Suckever, and Szejna Efron. After the war, scholars compiled an extended list of artists associated with the group.

The core members who would later assume leadership roles—Kaczerginski, Volf, Grade, and Sutzkever—were not founding members. Sutzkever was initially rejected in 1932 because his nature poetry was deemed irrelevant to social needs of the time, though he later became the group's model of "poised poetic refinement".

Yung-Vilne was loosely structured around shared generational and geographic bonds, working-class origins, and humanistic left-wing perspectives. The group had no formal artistic manifesto, and embraced diverse literary styles and themes. Historian Justin Cammy considers the lack of manifesto to be "an ideological statement in itself".

Kaczerginski served as a de facto group leader: he organized all the events, and served as an editor of the group's journal. The group often gathered in "Velfkeh's" restaurant, favourite place of Vilna's Jewish intellectuals.

Moyshe Kulbak, then considered Europe's most popular living Yiddish poet, taught several group members in Vilna's secular Yiddish schools. Max Weinreich, director of YIVO, led a Yiddishist scouting organization called Bin (Bee) that promoted cultural pride of place. Both Volf and Sutzkever participated in Bin's activities. In 1939, Volf started to mentor Yungvald (Young Forest), a group of young writers (most of them were children); their best known member was Hirsh Glik, who later composed the famous partisan hymn in Vilna Ghetto during the Nazi occupation.

YIVO's archivist Leyzer Ran, himself from Vilna, enumerates the members of Vilna's various artist groups in more detail:

The literary youth group Yung Vilne (1929-1941) consisted of eleven poets, three novelists, one songwriter and six painters. Its 'even younger' sister group, Yungvald (1936-1941) boasted five poets and one painter. Members of various Yiddish cultural and artistic movements include thirty-two poets, eighteen songwriters, ten novelists, three feuilletonists, five essayists, twenty-eight publicists and journalists, sixteen writers for the theatre (two of dramas, four of musicals, five of revues, three of marionette shows, two of stage adaptations). There were, moreover, fourteen children's writers (seven of songs, four of plays and three of textbooks). There were five educationalists, four bibliographers, five folklorists and ethnographers, eighteen historians, four economists, two specialists in Jewish agriculture, seven in literature, six in linguistics, three in German studies, three in art and several in astronomy, botany and Biblical studies.

=== Known members ===
- Chaim Grade (1910–1982), poet, later prose writer
- Shimshon Kahan (1905–1941), folk poet and translator
- Peretz Miransky (1908–1993), fabulist poet
- Avrom Sutzkever (1913–2010), poet
- Elkhonen Vogler (1907–1969), symbolist and folk modernist poet
- Leyzer Volf (1910–1943), poet and parodist
- Shmerke Kaczerginski (1908–1954), prose writer
- Moyshe Levin (1907–1942), short story writer and children's books author
- Bencijon Michtom (1907–1941), artist
- Rachel Suckever (1904–1943), artist
- Szejna Efron (1909–1983), artist
- Henekh Soloveytshik (1906–1937), folk poet
- Shloyme Belis (1907–1995), poet
- Rafael Chwoles (1913–2002), artist
- Lejb Zameczek (?-1943), artist

== Style and publications ==
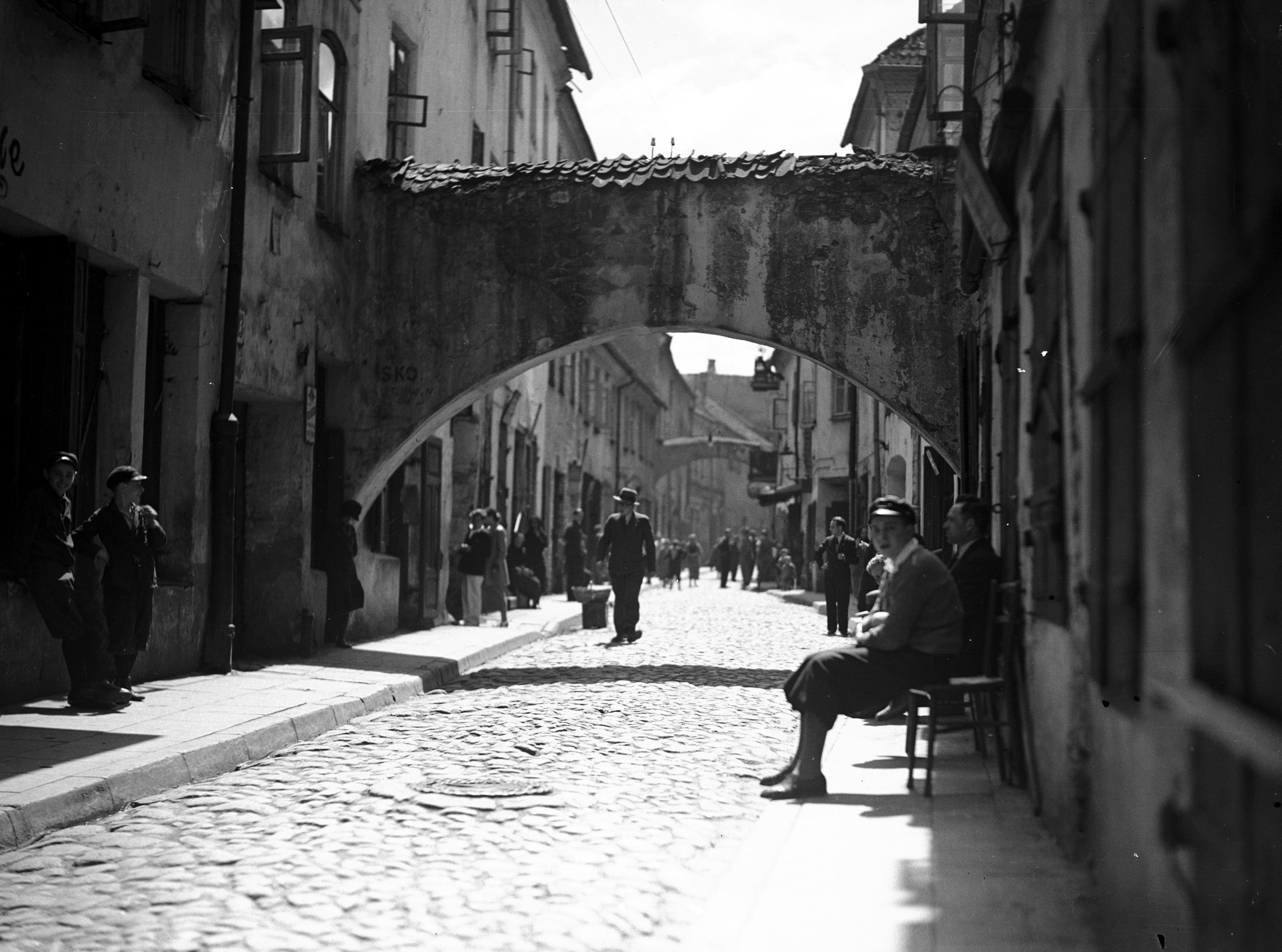
Vilna, Jatkever gas, 1935. Chaim Grade lived with his mother in a room at Jatkever gas, 15 (now Mesinių str. 11)

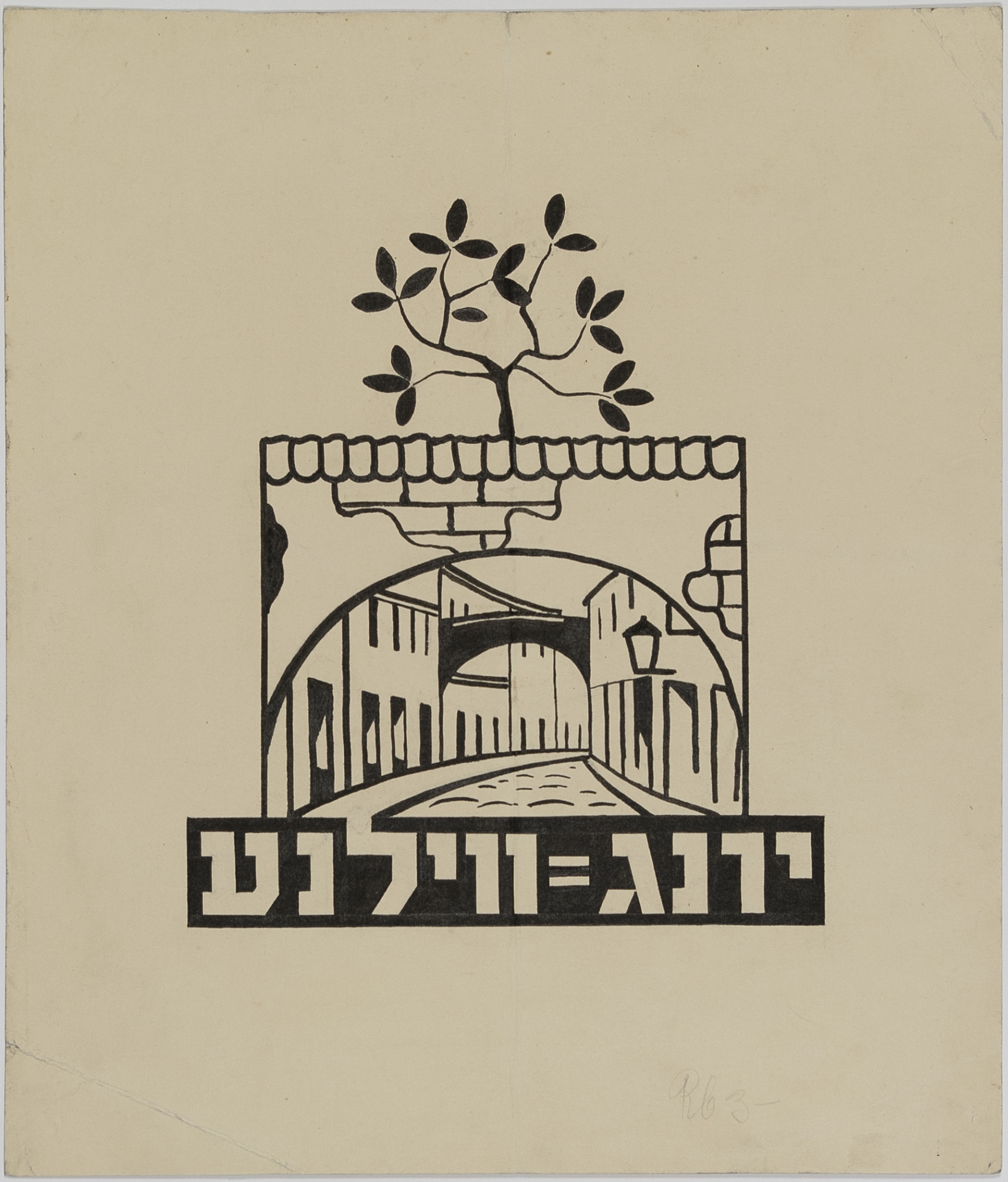
Yung-Vilne logo, designed by Bencion Michtom

While politically leftist, Yung-Vilne never collectively committed to a specific political program, which was unusual for artistic groups of that period. Members held diverse views ranging from communism to Jewish territorialism.

Each of its members excelled at a different genre of writing or a different theme. Its productions included Volf’s parodies of European and Yiddish literature, Grade’s prophetic voice and explorations of the tension between the traditional world of Torah study and secular culture, Sutzkever’s neoclassical modernism and joyful poems about nature, Miranski’s fables, Vogler’s pastoral symbolism, Kahan’s earthy lyrics of the peasantry, Kaczerginski’s proletarian reportage, and Levin’s naturalism. The group’s visual artists, especially Mikhtom, developed a local iconography influenced by Vilna’s human and physical realities.
Justin Cammy

In its journal, the group members used phoneticized Hebrew (written the way the words are pronounced in Yiddish), but provided no explanations for this decision. Justin Cammy conjectures that it was done "to equalize all constituent elements of the Yiddish language by forcing Hebrew words to be spelt according to the Yiddish orthographic system", or to show Yung-Vilne's alignment with Soviet Yiddishists that "had liberated itself from the religious connotations of Hebrew words by emptying them from their authentic form", or perhaps as an attempt to show both modernism and populism at the same time.

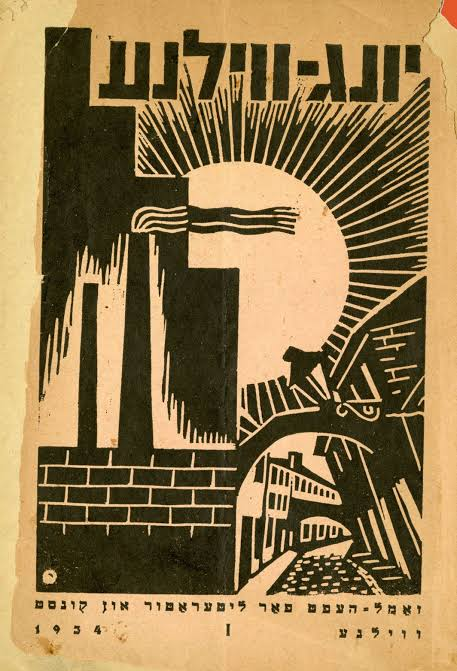
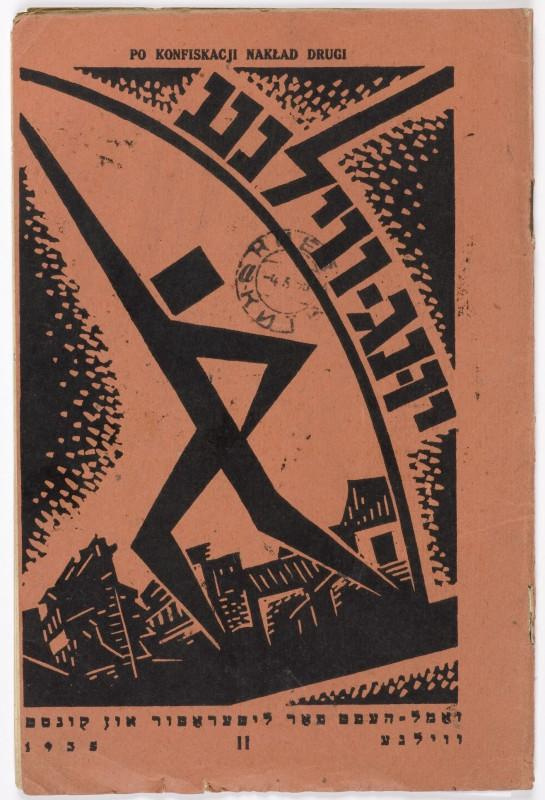
Covers of the first (1934) and second (1935) issues of the journal, designed by Bencion Michtom

The group published three issues of their literary journal Yung-Vilne in 1934–1936, described as a little magazine, and collaborated with other artists in Naye bleter (1939), Untervegs (1940), and Bleter 1940, and local Yiddish newspapers.

Graphical artist Bencijon Michtom designed covers of the journal. Joanna Lisek writes that it served as a "kind of manifesto defining the ideological identity of the group and somehow filled the lack of formulated programs". The cover of the first issue shows a juxtaposition of the old Vilna's street with an arch, and a modern factory's smoking chimneys, with a rising sun above it. The cover of the second issue features a human figure composed of sharp lines, that combines elements of cubism and expressionism. Michtom also designed the group's logo: a young tree above old Vilna's street.

== Individual works ==
=== Chaim Grade ===
Chaim Grade, native of Vilna, spent many years in strict Musar yeshivas. At 22, he broke with religion and became a secular poet. Abraham Novershtern writes that in his early poems Grade "avoided any subject which could be a bone of contention among his potential readers". His first poetic collection Yo (Yes) and the epic poem Musernikes were published in Vilna. According to Novershtern, Muserniks is "devoid of any political or social thematics".

Grade's poem, Hey, khaver Grade (Hey, Comrade Grade), was included in the first issue of Yung Vilne (1934); it is one of a few examples of political themes in Grade's works. However, it wasn't included in his first poetry collection, Yo, and was never republished; "the text is mainly an intérior dialogue in which the speaker takes an ironic and distant attitude toward his aspirations and fears as a typical petit bourgeois intellectual, aspirations and fears that are judged and found wanting".

=== Shmerke Kaczerginski ===
Kaczerginski was the only group member active in the outlaw Polish Communist Party. His songs were well known, and he wrote for New York-based magazines. But he was also the only member of the group who didn't publish an individual book by 1940, for his own frustration.

=== Avrom Sutzkever ===
In 1935, Sutzkever wrote a collection titled "Shtern in shney" (Stars in snow), a cycle of 36 sonnets set in Siberia. The collection "challenged expectations of poetry set in Siberia": Sutzkever's Siberia is "a world of endless wonder frozen in childhood memory". In it, the poet talks with a snowman and the North Star. It was published in his 1937 collection, Lider, and republished in 1952 as Sibir. Lider consisted of four parts (as seasons) and 52 poems (number of weeks in a year). The collection included a ballad to Cyprian Norwid. In 1938, he worked in YIVO on old Yiddish literature, and published several poems in old Yiddish. In 1939, Sutzkever translated Polish poetry into Yiddish.

=== Elkhonen Vogler ===
Elkhonen Vogler was described as one of the most important poets of the group. He wrote rustic poetry, and in 1930s published two lengthy narrative poems. His pen name "Vogler" means "wanderer". According to Cammy, "Vogler preferred writing about the flora and fauna of the Polish-Lithuanian-White Russian borderlands to provide local audiences and a transnational Yiddish readership with a concrete geography through which to embolden their sense of doikayt (hereness), a principle of diasporism in which Jewish life was informed by local languages, local folkways, and its embeddedness in a specific landscape".

Vogler's poem "Tsevorfene bleter" (Scattered leaves) was published in the second issue of Yung-Vilne:

The world is—a book by a crazy poet
The days and nights watch over him—they stand on guard;
The villages—are its fallen pages
And the cities—are its hard covers....

... Every letter—is a peasant, every word—is a family
The diacritics the dots and the dashes—are the animals,
Dogs and wolves who bark, howl and moo, and then fall silent,
But people weep and their tears are the commas.

In 1935, Vogler published a book A bletl in vint (A page in the wind); it was the first individual book by a group member. The cover art was done by a fellow artist, Rokhl Sutzkever. In 1939, he published Tsvey beriozes bay m trakt (Two birch trees by the highway), a narrative poem set during World War I, which he wrote in 1935-1938.

=== Leyzer Volf ===
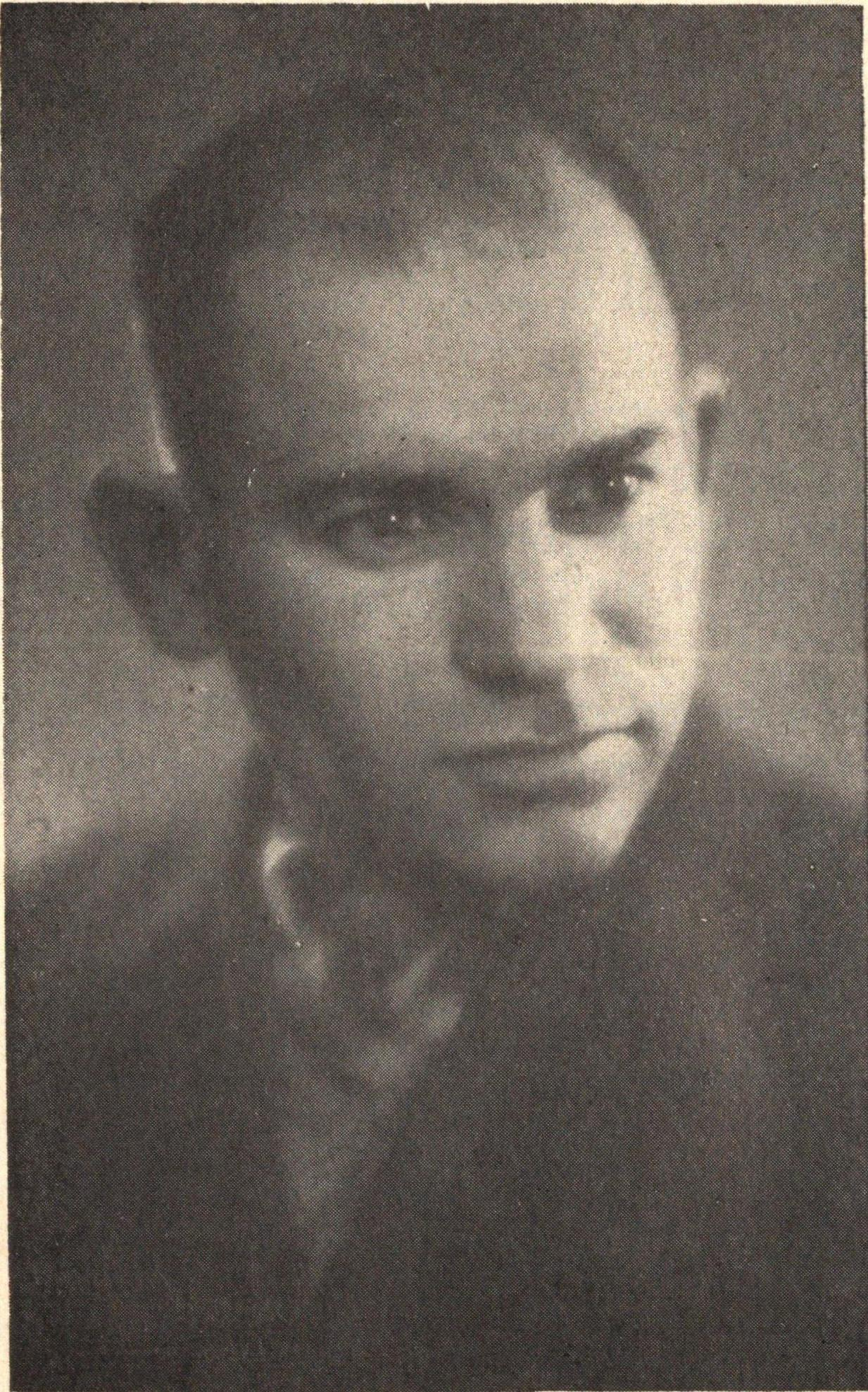
Leyzer Volf

Leyzer Volf became Yung-Vilne's defining early voice. Despite his shy, sickly childhood in the working-class Shnipeshok suburb, Volf developed a bold poetic persona through pseudonyms like "Bestye Kurazh" (Beast of Courage) and "Herts Nakht" (Heart of the Night). His early poems combined exaggerated, mocking descriptions of Vilna's urban landscape with deep emotional resonance, creating what critics called a "sentimental grotesque" style. In June 1930, Volf composed 1,001 untitled poems.

Volf's work often appropriated European literary forms while addressing local concerns. His poem "Di veber" (The Weavers, 1935) adapted Heinrich Heine's protest poem from the previous century to rally readers against the German threat. His epic "Evigingo" (1936) was modeled on Longfellow's Hiawatha and published in Latin alphabet. Volf also reworked classic Yiddish literary characters like Sholem Aleichem's Tevye and Menachem Mendl to address contemporary political conflicts.

First lines of the "Evegingo":

In di fajchte tife dzchungles
af di zumpn zshabazchuko,
baj dem shvarcn vaser tshungo,
— vos in vejchn tol amiko,
lebt der alter gutamingo,
vojnt der alter gutamingo,
esn est er alte shlangen,
fejgl-ejer, blinde verim,
zshabes, fish mit grine ojgn,
veverkes, vos kenen flien,
majzlech, vos dercejln majses,
malpes, vos farshtiln zkejnim.

In the deep and dampest jungles
In the swamps of Zhabazkhuko
By the blackest river Chungo
In the gentle vale Amiko
Lives the aging Gutamingo
Dwells the aged Gutamingo,
Dining on the run-down serpents,
Eggs of birds and sightless vermin,
Frogs and fish with eyes green-tinted,
Squirrels that fly about the treetops,
Mice who tell each other stories,
Apes who sit and curse their elders.

The third issue of the journal contained several poems by Volf that were "more propaganda than poetry". Because of this, Kaczerginski, as a de facto group leader, was arrested, but the judge decided that the journal had no criminal intent in it.

=== Henekh Soloveytshik ===
Henekh Soloveytshik wrote prose stories; his heroes were often not Jews, but "Lithuanian and Polish peasants and non-Jewish villagers". Soloveytshik was also known for his "performative nature":

At one of the group’s public readings in Vilna in the early 1930s, Soloveytshik appeared in tall boots and a short pelt, having just returned from the provinces. He tossed a heavy potato sack onto the stage and began to recite by heart his most recent story about a peasant who murders the nobleman who attempted to seduce his daughter. When he reached the point in the narrative where the peasant’s axe is about to come crashing down on the lecherous nobleman, a dark stream of blood began to trickle from his sack onto the stage and down into the audience. People jumped out of their seats in fear, perhaps thinking that Soloveytshik had brought the nobleman’s head with him. In fact, the sack contained several frozen calf heads he had brought home that had begun to thaw during his reading.

In 1932, Soloveytshik illegally crossed the border and went to the Soviet Union.

=== Shimshon Kahan ===
After getting his education in Vilna, Shimshon Kahan moved to Troki, where he felt in love and ran away with a local Gypsy girl. Her father forbade it, and to avoid banishment from the family, the girl returned home and Kahan went back to Vilna. There, he translated folksongs from Russian, Ukrainian, Belarusian, and Roma to Yiddish, and urged Jews to acknowledge that they had a lot in common with Roma. One of his known works is a poem Litvishe tsigayner (Lithuanian Gypsies), read in 1932.

=== Moyshe Levin ===
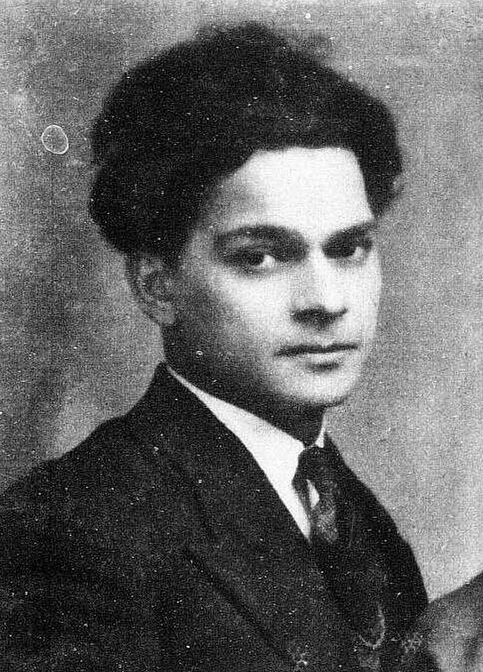
Levin in 1937

Moyshe Levin, also known as Ber Sarin, was a short story writer and children's books illustrator. He studied at Vladimir Medem Teachers’ Seminary, a then worked as a teacher in Jewish secular schools (of the Tsenṭrale Yidishe Shul-Organizatsye (Central Yiddish School Organization)) until 1934, when he was prohibited to teach because of his "revolutionary activities". Besides short stories, he wrote and illustrated short Yiddish books in rhyme "for children who were just beginning to read", and stories for older children. He was especially fond of stories about cats.

His stories for adults are described as reportages, a stories of everyday life:

The stories depict the sights and smells of the streets of Jewish Vilna: Jewish glaziers, young intellectuals and teachers, merchants, storekeepers, relations with non-Jews, economic inequality and class differences, poverty and hunger, prostitution, pogroms, religious and generational gaps between parents and children, the ineffectual efforts of charitable and welfare organizations, relations with relatives in America, American films in Vilna movie theaters, and political convictions such as socialism and Zionism and their effects on people and communities.

Levin fled to Minsk when Vilnius was captures, and became a partisan liaison there; he also created fake Nazi documents and passports. Levin's house in the Minsk Ghetto became a partisan headquarters. He was murdered in March 2, 1942; his wife and daughter was likely also murdered. Few of his works survived.

=== Rachel Suckever ===
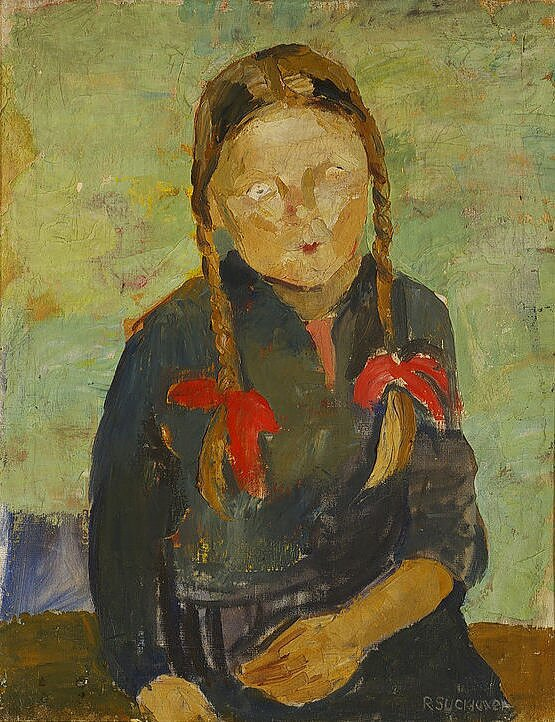
Suckever, Girl, 1935

Rachel Suckever studied at a Jewish gymnasium while also attending the drawing school of the Polish artists' society in Vilna. In 1925, she enrolled as a non-matriculated student in the Faculty of Fine Arts at Stefan Batory University. Between 1928 and 1930 she traveled to New York with her father, working as a hotel maid while continuing to paint.

In 1930, she created "Strike at an American Port", a composition that provoked debate in the Jewish and Polish press when shown at an exhibition marking the tenth anniversary of the YIVO institute. The original is lost, only a 1936 reproduction survived. The painting was described as "a unique example of the influence of American and, through it, Mexican art on the art of the 1930s in Poland."

Back in Vilnius she resumed her studies under Ludomir Sleńdziński, one of the city's most influential painters, and joined Yung-Vilne. She designed covers for poetry collections of her fellow group members: Elkhonen Vogler and Leyzer Volf. In 1938, she organized her personal exhibition in Vilnia, and, in 1940, was the only woman and only Jew on the organizing committee of a Vilnius artists' exhibition.

== Holocaust and aftermath ==
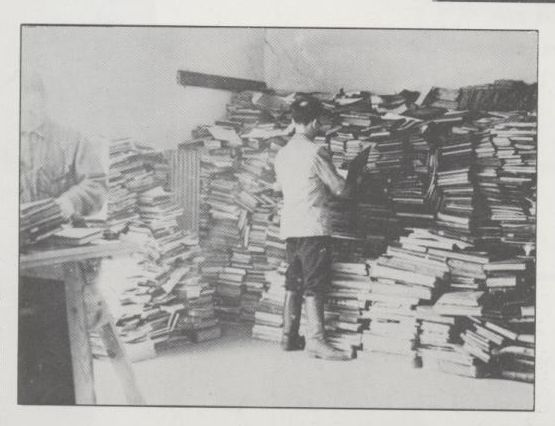
Shmerke Kaczerginski in Jewish Museum with books saved by the Paper Brigade from Vilna Ghetto

In 1941, Vilna was occupied by the Nazis. Kaczerginski and Sutzkever participated in the Paper Brigade, rescuing Jewish books and manuscripts from the YIVO collection from destruction. The group also contributed to cultural resistance within the Vilna Ghetto; Sutzkever organized poetic readings, theater performances, and lectures in the ghetto. Sutzkever continued to write even in the ghetto; his poetry from this period represents some of the most significant Yiddish literary responses to the Holocaust. Sutzkever escaped from the ghetto before its liquidation by Nazis in 1943, and, together with his wife, joined local partisans. He continued to write there as well. When the Soviets found out that he was alive, a rescue operation was conducted that brought him to Moscow. Later, Sutzkever testified at the Nuremberg trials.

Rachel Suckever too lived and worked in the ghetto. She painted portraits and landscapes on German commission in exchange for food and managed to save art materials. With these she documented ghetto life, favoring portraits over everyday scenes, most notably several likenesses of the teacher, composer, and choir conductor Jakub Gerstein, used at his memorial services. She also produced a calligraphed, watercolored rendering of Avrom Sutzkever's ghetto poem Un azoy zolstu redn tsum yosem ("Say This to the Orphan"). She was among the ghetto prisoners conscripted to build a large-scale scale model of Vilnius (Plastiker Plan Vilna) for the German administration; none of the artists on that project survived. As the ghetto was liquidated, prisoners were sorted for labor camps or death camps. Suckever chose to stay with her mother and sister Chaya; the three are believed to have been killed in Treblinka or in Maidanek, in 1943 or 1944. Her exact date of death is unknown.

After the war, most surviving members emigrated from the Soviet Union: Grade to New York, Miranski to Montreal, Kaczerginski to Buenos Aires, Sutzkever to Tel Aviv, and Vogler to Paris.

Sutzkever emigrated to Eretz Israel in 1947, before Israel became independent. There, with the help of Zalman Shazar, he was able to establish a Yiddish literary journal, Di goldene keyt, and gather a Yiddish group, Yung Yisroel. He also helped to establish a Yiddish literary prize, named for Itzik Manger.

Several publications like Leyzer Ran's Finf un tsvantsik yor "Yung Vilne" (1955) and a special issue of Di goldene keyt (1980) were dedicated to the group.

Historian Sol Liptzin wrote that only Grade and Sutzkever became mature artists, as almost everyone else perished in the Holocaust or died soon after the war.
