= Agunaix =

Scientific classification
- Domain: Eukaryota
- Kingdom: Animalia
- Phylum: Arthropoda
- Class: Insecta
- Order: Lepidoptera
- Superfamily: Noctuoidea
- Family: Erebidae
- Subfamily: Arctiinae
- Genus: Agunaix; Schaus, 1898
- Species: A. lacrumans

Binomial name
- Agunaix lacrumans Schaus, 1898

Synonyms
- Agunaix Hampson, 1898

Genus of moths

Agunaix is a monotypic moth genus in the subfamily Arctiinae. Its single species, Agunaix lacrumans, is found in Peru and Bolivia. Both the genus and species were first described by William Schaus in 1898.
