= Leyzer Volf =

Yiddish poet and writer (1910-1943)

- לייזער וואלף
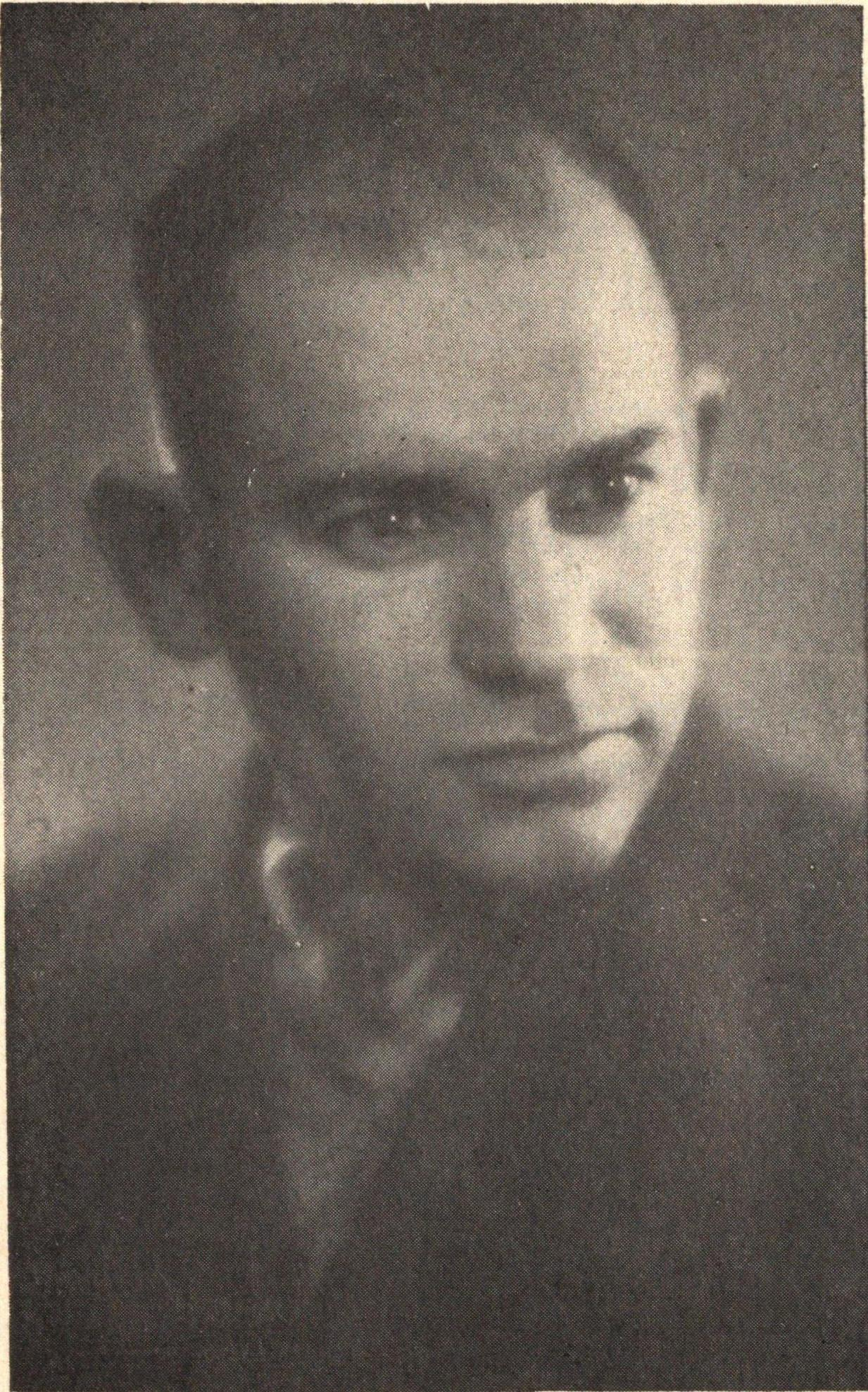
- Born: Eliezer Mekler; 1910; Šnipiškės, Vilnius, Vilnius Governorate, Russian Empire (present-day Lithuania)
- Died: 1944 (aged 33–34); Shakhrisabz, Uzbek SSR (present-day Uzbekistan)
- Occupations: Poet, writer
- Writing career
- Language: Yiddish

Leyzer Volf (Yiddish: לייזער וואָלף; Russian: Лейзер Менделевич Вольф, romanized: Leyzer Mendelevich Volf; born Eliezer Mekler; 1910, in Šnipiškės, Vilnius – April 1943, in Shakhrisabz) was a Yiddish poet and writer of the Yung-Vilne movement, best remembered for his poems Black Pearls (1939), Lyric and satire (1940), and Brown Beast (1943).

== Biography ==
Volf's father was a house painter and his mother was a housewife. He was the fourth child in his family. He was sent to cheder at age four, but quickly left after being shocked by the way the rabbi treated the children, after which he was taught privately at home by a melamed. Later on he would study at a secular Jewish folk school in Vilnius and attend a youth camp for weak children; throughout this period he kept a large distance from other children and did not have many friends. Already in school he was considered to be an excellent writer and an avid reader.

Volf joined an artistic group Yung-Vilne and soon became it's defining early voice. Despite his shy, sickly childhood in the working-class Shnipeshok suburb, Volf developed a bold poetic persona through pseudonyms like "Bestye Kurazh" (Beast of Courage). His early poems combined exaggerated, mocking descriptions of Vilna's urban landscape with deep emotional resonance, creating what critics called a "sentimental grotesque" style.

Volf's work often appropriated European literary forms while addressing local concerns. His poem "Di veber" (The Weavers, 1935) adapted Heinrich Heine's protest poem from the previous century to rally readers against the German threat. His epic "Evigingo" (1936) was modeled on Longfellow's Hiawatha and published in Latin alphabet. Volf also reworked classic Yiddish literary characters like Sholem Aleichem's Tevye and Menachem Mendl to address contemporary political conflicts.

First lines of the "Evegingo":

In di fajchte tife dzchungles
af di zumpn zshabazchuko,
baj dem shvarcn vaser tshungo,
— vos in vejchn tol amiko,
lebt der alter gutamingo,
vojnt der alter gutamingo,
esn est er alte shlangen,
fejgl-ejer, blinde verim,
zshabes, fish mit grine ojgn,
veverkes, vos kenen flien,
majzlech, vos dercejln majses,
malpes, vos farshtiln zkejnim.

In the deep and dampest jungles
In the swamps of Zhabazkhuko
By the blackest river Chungo
In the gentle vale Amiko
Lives the aging Gutamingo
Dwells the aged Gutamingo,
Dining on the run-down serpents,
Eggs of birds and sightless vermin,
Frogs and fish with eyes green-tinted,
Squirrels that fly about the treetops,
Mice who tell each other stories,
Apes who sit and curse their elders.

The third issue of the Yung-Vilne journal contained several poems by Volf that were "more propaganda than poetry". Because of this, Shmerke Kaczerginski, as a de facto group leader, was arrested, but the judge decided that the journal had no criminal intent in it.
