= Golden Chain =

There are multiple uses for the term Golden Chain:

- Golden chain is the common name for the genus Laburnum, and related species of small trees with decorative yellow flowers.
- Hadith of Golden Chain, a hadith (tradition) narrated from the eighth Shia Imam
- Order of the Golden Chain, name of a number of secret societies
- The Golden Chain, an alleged group of al Qaeda's wealthy sponsors
- Golden Chain Highway, another name for State Route 49 in California, United States
- Golden Chain of Homer, a 1723 hermetical book edited by Anton Josef Kirchweger
- A Golden Chain, or The Description of Theology, a 1591 book by the Puritan William Perkins (theologian)
- "Golden Chain", a song by Stars, from the compilation album Exclaim! 13th Anniversary Cross-Canada Concert Series
- The Golden Chain (Di goldene keyt), a 1907 Yiddish-language play by I.L. Peretz
- The Golden Chain (Di goldene keyt (magazine)), the leading Yiddish-language literary journal of the post-World War II era
- Golden Chain (slavic literature)
- A Golden Chain of succession in Pythagorean, Platonic, Neoplatonic, and perennial philosophy
