= Shmerke Kaczerginski =

Yiddish poet, musician, writer and cultural activist

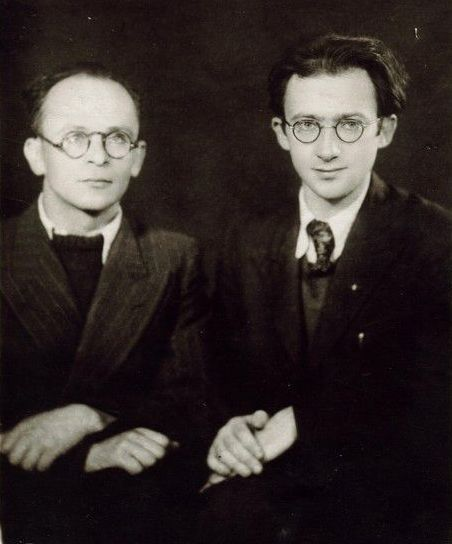
- Shmerke Kaczerginski (left) and Abraham Sutzkever (right) in 1930s
- Born: Shmaryahu Kaczerginski; 28 October 1908; Vilna, Russian Empire
- Died: 23 April 1954 (aged 45); Córdoba Province, Argentina
- Occupations: Poet, writer, partisan
- Spouse(s): Barbara Kaufman (1942–1943), Meri Szutan (1946-1954)
- Children: 1
- Writing career
- Language: Yiddish
- Notable work: Tates, mames, kinderlekh
- Movements: Yiddish literature, Holocaust literature

Shmaryahu "Shmerke" Kaczerginski (Yiddish: שמערקע קאַטשערגינסקי; 28 October 1908 – 23 April 1954) was a Yiddish poet, musician, writer and cultural activist. Born to a poor family in Vilna and orphaned at a young age, Kaczerginski was educated at the local Talmud Torah and night school, where he became involved in communist politics and was regularly beaten or imprisoned.

At the age of 15 he began publishing original songs and poetry, including Tates, mames, kinderlekh ("Fathers, mothers, children"), and soon began organising Yung-Vilne, a secular Jewish writing collective whose other members included Abraham Sutzkever and Chaim Grade. The Nazi invasion of Poland led to Kaczerginski's eventual imprisonment in the Vilna Ghetto, where he helped to hide Jewish cultural works with Sutzkever as part of the Paper Brigade and joined the United Partisans Organisation, participating in the failed Vilna Ghetto uprising and then escaping to the forest to fight with both the partisans and the Soviets.

After the expulsion of the Nazis from Vilna by the Soviet Army, Kaczerginski returned home to recover the hidden cultural works and founded the first post-Holocaust Jewish museum in Europe; he quickly became disenchanted with the Soviets and communism and developed into an ardent Zionist. After some time in Łódź, he moved to Paris with his second wife, Meri Szutan. In 1950 the family moved to Buenos Aires. Shmerke Kaczerginski was killed in a plane crash in Argentina in 1954, at the age of 45.

Renowned during his lifetime as a poet and writer, Kaczerginski dedicated much of his time after the start of the Second World War to collecting pre-war Yiddish songs and songs of the Holocaust in order to save Yiddishkeit from destruction. The author, editor or publisher of most of the first post-Holocaust songbooks, Kaczerginski was responsible for preserving over 250 Holocaust songs – the majority of those still known. Despite the enduring popularity of many of his own works, and the importance of his labours to researchers and Yiddish cultural activists, his early death has led to his relative anonymity.

== Early life and career ==
Kaczerginski was born on 28 October 1908 in Vilna, Russian Empire, to Volf and Alte Kaczerginski. Both of his parents died in early 1914, leaving Kaczerginski and his younger brother Yankl in the care of their grandfather. He was sent to the Talmud Torah for his education, where he was "a good scholar and even better comrade". After graduating he enrolled in night school and supported himself by working for a lithographer named Hirsh Ayzenshtat, whose shop apparently served a mostly proletarian clientele. Around this time Kaczerginski was drawn into local circles of the outlawed communist party, and published his first writings – articles concerning class struggle and the living conditions of workers.

As a consequence of his political radicalism, Kaczerginski was regularly beaten by police and often imprisoned in Lukiškės Prison, where he organised a drama club for other inmates. This radicalism also led him to write his earliest known songs, including Tates, mames, kinderlekh ('Fathers, mothers, children'), a renowned Jewish socialist song written when he was 15 years old.

A year later he joined Yung Vilne, a Jewish writing collective whose other members included Abraham Sutzkever and Chaim Grade. Kaczerginski was responsible for organisational work and editing, along with writing "animated, sometimes incendiary verses" that were extremely popular with the group's audience. In parallel, he worked for the Yiddish-language newspaper Morgen Freiheit and the Soviet organisation Agroid.

== Second World War ==
After the Soviet invasion of Poland, Kaczerginski moved to Białystok in order to volunteer for the Red Army, returning to Vilna in June 1940. Working with various Jewish writers organisations, his initial enthusiasm for the Soviet cause was soured by the shutting or censoring of many newspapers and publishing organisations, along with the arrest of Zalman Reisen and other members of the Yiddish community. Following Operation Barbarossa Vilna was occupied by Nazi Germany and the local Jewish community shot or rounded up and sent to camps or ghettos. Kaczerginski managed to avoid capture until 1942 by posing as a deaf and mute beggar. Finally identified as Jewish, Kaczerginski was sent to the Vilna Ghetto, where he married Barbara Kaufman and returned to writing in order to improve morale for the inmates. Works produced during this time included Friling ('Springtime'), about his wife's death in April 1943, Shtiler, shtiler ('Quiet, Quiet') and Yugnt himn ('Hymn of Youth'). When representatives of the Einsatzstab Reichsleiter Rosenberg (ERR)—the Nazi organisation tasked with stealing or destroying Jewish cultural property—dictated that the Jewish literary archives in Vilna be categorised and burnt, Kaczerginski was one of the Ghetto residents forced to help them. Along with other labourers working on the project, including Zelig Kalmanovich and Abraham Sutzkever, he formed the Paper Brigade, which instead smuggled thousands of works past the Nazi guards and hid them in various caches in and around the Ghetto for retrieval after the war.

Having joined the Fareynikte Partizaner Organizatsye ('United Partisans Organisation'), Kaczerginski fought in the Vilna Ghetto resistance and escaped with the survivors to the surrounding forests. Working along Sutzkever as the historian of the FPO's Vitnberg Brigade, he translated many Soviet fighting songs into Yiddish and during his service with a Soviet unit wrote the "uncharacteristically grisly-worded" Partizaner-Marsh ('Partisan's March'), Yid, du Partizaner ('The Jewish Partisan') and Varshe (Warsaw) to commemorate the Warsaw Ghetto Uprising.

== Vilna, Łódź and Paris ==
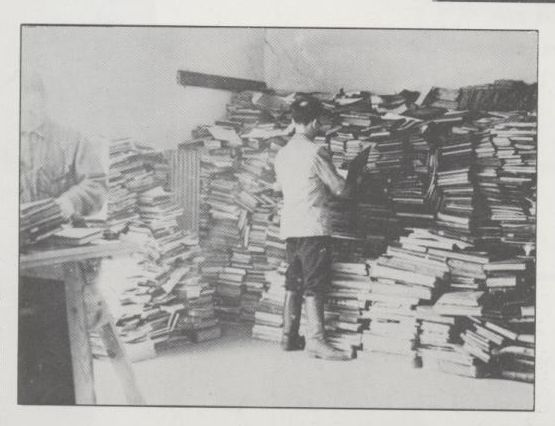
Kaczerginski with books saved by the Paper Brigade

Participating in the recapture of Vilna, Kaczerginski returned with Sutzkever, Abba Kovner and other FPO survivors to go about rebuilding Jewish culture and digging up the hidden Paper Brigade caches. He founded the Vilna Museum of Jewish Art and Culture, later known as the Vilna Jewish Museum, the first post-Holocaust Jewish museum in Europe, with some of the recovered materials. Although the museum was theoretically supported by Lithuanian and Soviet authorities, they provided few resources, assigning the organisers no budget and only giving them a burnt out former Ghetto building as a headquarters. Following the end of the war in 1945, it became clear that the volunteers' work was incompatible with the priorities of Soviet authorities, who burnt 30 tons of cache materials and, having demanded that any publicly displayed books be reviewed by a censor, simply refused to return any that were submitted.

Accordingly, Kaczerginski and others prepared to smuggle the collection yet again—this time to the United States. Volunteers took the books across the border to Poland, enlisting the help of Bricha contacts to move them into non-Soviet Europe. From there much of the material went to New York, although some was retained by Sutzkever (who later gave his material to the National Library of Israel).

After departing Vilna (and experiencing extreme anti-semitism in Moscow), Kaczerginski moved to the largely-intact city of Łódź, where he was employed by the Central Jewish Historical Commission. Kaczerginski had begun working as a zamler ('collector') of Jewish music in 1944, considering the partisan and ghetto songs to be "the martyrs’ last will and testament to future generations" and worthy of preservation. Lacking formal musical training, Kaczerginski instead memorised each song, interviewing former comrades and other survivors, before having them transcribed by David Botwinik.

Using some of this material, he edited and published Undzer gezang, the first post-war Jewish songbook in Poland and the first songbook to explicitly include "ghetto songs". Having undergone a political transformation during the war and early Soviet occupation, he shifted from communism to an engagement with Zionism, writing Khalutsim lid ('Pioneers' song') in 1946 and collaborating with the Zionist Gordoniya collective to help Jewish children in Łódź. A year later he married Meri Szutan, a native of Švenčionys.

In the aftermath of the 1946 Kielce pogrom, vast numbers of Polish Jews left the country, including Kaczerginski, who settled in Paris. From there he toured 17 displaced persons camps in November 1947, lecturing survivors of the Holocaust, gathering new songs, and stopping in Munich to record several pieces for the Jewish Historical Commission. During this time he also wrote several original works, including Undzer lid ('Our Song') in tribute to Hirsh Glick, and S'vet geshen ('It Will Happen') commemorating the British attack on the SS Exodus. His employment with the Parisian Jewish Culture Congress allowed him to visit the United States in 1948 to attend the World Jewish Cultural Conference, and he used the opportunity to take speaking engagements in 30 different cities before returning to Paris.

The remainder of the 1940s saw a writing rate that was "productive even by his own industrious standards". 1947 saw the publication of a Wilno ghetto songbook (Dos gezang fun vilner geto), a social history of the destruction of Wilno (Khurbn vilna) and Partizaner geyen!, or 'Partisans Advance!', a memoir of his time in combat with the FPO. A year later he published another songbook, Lider fun di getos un and in 1949 the political tract Tsvishn hamer un serp: 'Between Hammer and Sickle'. The late 1940s also saw the birth of his only daughter and child, Libele.

== Move to Argentina and death ==
Having visited Israel in 1950, Kaczerginski was excited by the possibility of moving there – but instead chose to take his family to Buenos Aires, after a job offer from the Jewish Cultural Congress, and they sailed there in May 1950. Already famous as a result of both his lecturing and publication, Kaczerginski's arrival:

evoked powerful manifestations of affection and enthusiasm for the fighter and singer of Yiddish Vilna and for the indefatigable developer of a new Yiddish culture. [It] was a great occasion in the life of the Argentine community and thousands of people will long, long remember the grand reception honoring him and the overflowing halls during his first lectures, to which the audience listened with bated breath. Within a short time he had won the greatest affection of Argentine Jewry. His friends numbered in the hundreds, perhaps in the thousands.

Local leftists vehemently opposed Kaczerginski due to his explicit conversion away from communism, and often disrupted his speaking engagements. Despite this he maintained a heavy pace of lecturing, songwriting and journalism, writing for the Israeli Labor Party newspaper Hador and publishing Ikh bin geven a partizan: di grine legende ('I Was a Partisan: The Green Legend'), a two-part memoir based on the journals he had maintained throughout the Second World War. Working with Michl Gelbart and Artur Rolnik, he began work on another anthology of Yiddish songs, and in parallel wrote Zol shoyn kumen di geule ('Let Salvation Come'). Set to music by Abraham Isaac Kook, the song is considered "one of its author’s most enduring works".

In 1954 during the festival of Passover, Kaczerginski found himself lecturing in Mendoza; after local anti-communists swore to boycott his lecture, he extended his time there for an extra day, speaking to hundreds about his experience as a Ghetto fighter. Wanting to see his family again, he decided to travel by plane rather than the longer train route, and was on the flight to Buenos Aires from Mendoza on 23 April 1954, when it crashed shortly after takeoff, killing everyone on board (see also Aerolíneas Argentinas accidents and incidents).

== Legacy ==
Kaczerginski's sudden death shocked the Yiddish-speaking world; to Chaim Grade, his loss marked "the inescapable end of the Old World Yiddish cultural community, already decimated and dispersed". Sutzkever, having heard of the accident in Tel Aviv, simply telegrammed the Kaczerginski family mir viln nit gleybn nito kayn werter: "we do not want to believe, there are no words". Many years later Sutzkever wrote him a memorial poem, Mit shmerken, ven es brenen velder ('With Shmerke, when forests are burning').

Kaczerginski himself has become "largely anonymous", and is little known outside of Yiddish language circles despite the enduring popularity of many of his songs. Despite this, he is considered to have been tremendously influential: having collected over 250 Holocaust songs during his time as a partisan, poet and writer, his songbooks are the source of the majority of surviving pieces of the genre.

== Bibliography ==
- Dawidowicz, Lucy S. (2008). From That Place and Time: A Memoir, 1938–1947. New Brunswick, N.J.: Rutgers University Press. ISBN 978-0813543628.
- Duhl, Lisa (1999). Rocking an Empty Cradle: A Psychological Study of Yiddish Holocaust Lullabies. California School of Professional Psychology. OCLC 926122847.
- Fishman, David (1996). "Those Daring Escapades of Vilna's 'Papir Brigade': How a Yiddish Poet and His Crew Rescued Judaica". Forward.
- Fishman, David E. (2016). "The Last 'Zamlers': Avrom Sutzkever and Shmerke Kaczerginski in Vilna, 1944-1945". In Veidlinger, Jeffrey (ed.). Going to the People: Jews and the Ethnographic Impulse. Indiana University Press. pp. 164–174. ISBN 9780253019080.
- Kuznitz, Cecile Esther (2014). YIVO and the Making of Modern Jewish Culture: Scholarship for the Yiddish Nation. Cambridge University Press. ISBN 9781107014206.
- Werb, Bret Charles (2014). Yiddish Songs of the Shoah: A Source Study Based on the Collections of Shmerke Kaczerginski (PhD thesis). UMI Dissertation Publishing. OCLC 982299385.
