= Blume Lempel =

Ukrainian-Ameerican Yiddish-language novelist and short story writer (1907–1999)

Blume Lempel (unknown date)

Blume Lempel (May 13, 1906 – October 20, 1999) was a Ukrainian-born American Yiddish-language writer.

== Biography ==
Lempel was born in Khorostkiv, where she was educated at a cheder and a Hebrew elementary school. Her father was a kosher butcher.

In 1929, she left Ukraine for Paris where she stayed until 1939, when she immigrated to New York. During her time in France, she was involved in efforts to establish Yiddish literary culture in interwar Paris.

Lempel's writing career in America began in 1943 with a short story published in Der Tog, a Yiddish-language newspaper in New York City. She lived in Long Island, where she hid her literary career from her neighbors and went by the name Blanche.

In 1947, she serialized a novel about the World War II Occupation of Paris in Morgn Frayhayt, called Tsvishn tsvey veltn (Between Two Worlds). The novel is an unusual treatment of the Occupation, featuring a romantic relationship between a Nazi and a Jewish woman. In 1954, under the name Blanche Lempel, she published Storm over Paris, a translation of the 1947 novel. While not widely reviewed, it was positively received, with the Pasadena Independent describing it as having "some of the bitter elements of a great novel".

Lempel's stories were known for their treatment of controversial themes such as incest, abortion, and suicide.

Binem Heller served as Lempel's literary editor and agent for her first volume of short stories, A rege fun emes, published in 1981.

She also established a friendship with Chava Rosenfarb in 1982, after Rosenfarb read one of Lempel's short stories in Di goldene keyt. Their friendship ended in 1989, when Lempel falsely accused Rosenfarb of having been a kapo, after she read Rosenfarb's story Edgia's Revenge, a fictional first-person narrative from the perspective of a former kapo.

=== Award ===
In 1985, Lempel was the recipient of the Atran Prize for Yiddish Literature.

=== Lempel's works ===
Works in English

- Storm over Paris. New York: Philosophical Library, 1954.
- Oedipus in Brooklyn and Other Stories. Translated by Ellen Cassedy and Yermiyahu Ahron Taub. Takoma Park: Mandel Vilar Press, 2022.

Short-story collections:

- A rege fun emes. Tel Aviv: Y.L. Perets, 1981.
- Balade fun a holem. Tel Aviv: Yisroel-bukh, 1986.

== See also ==
- List of American novelists
- List of Jewish American authors
- List of people from New York (state)
- List of short story writers
- List of Ukrainian writers
- List of women writers
