= Denys Sichynsky =

Ukrainian composer and conductor (1865–1909)

- Денис Січинський
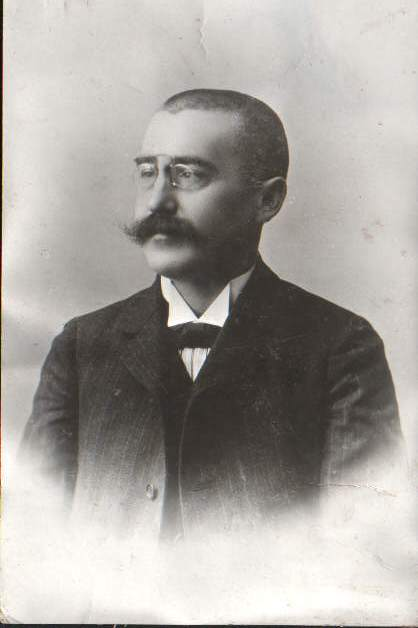
- Born: 2 October 1865; Kliuvyntsi, Austrian Empire (now Ukraine)
- Died: 6 June 1909 (aged 43); Stanyslaviv (now Ivano-Frankivsk, Ukraine)
- Education: Lviv Conservatory

Denys Sichynsky (Ukrainian: Денис Володимирович Січинський, romanized: Denys Volodymyrovych Sichynskyi; 2 October 1865 – 6 June 1909) was a Ukrainian composer, conductor, and teacher.

== Biography ==
Denys Sichynsky was born on 2 October 1865 in Kliuvyntsi, now the Khorostkiv urban hromada of the Chortkiv Raion of Ternopil Oblast in Ukraine.

In 1888–1891, he studied music in Ternopil and the Lviv Conservatory. In Lviv, Kolomyia, Stanyslaviv, and Przemyśl, he organized and conducted the choir association "Boian".

In 1894, Sichynsky, along with Ivan Franko, Mykhailo Pavlyk, Osyp Rozdolskyi, Filaret Kolessa, and Ostap Nyzhankivskyi, actively participated in a committee established in Lviv to collect and publish Ukrainian folk songs.

From 1899 he lived in Stanyslaviv (now Ivano-Frankivsk). In the city, he founded a music school and the publishing house "Muzychna Biblioteka" (which published works by Ukrainian composers); he was an active co-founder of the Union of Singing and Music Societies.

He died on 6 June 1909 in Stanyslaviv.

== Works ==
The first professional Ukrainian composer in Galicia.

Sichynsky is the author of the opera "Roxelana", for which Volodymyr Lutsyk and Stepan Charnetskyi wrote the libretto in 1908. Sichynsky has also composed works for symphony and chamber orchestras, piano solos, choral music, and liturgical score, including a cantata based on the text by Taras Shevchenko "Lichu v nevoli". Sichynsky created about 20 original songs for solo voice based on texts by Taras Shevchenko, Lesya Ukrainka, Ivan Franko, Bohdan Lepkyi, Uliana Kravchenko, and Heinrich Heine; he also arranged folk songs.

== Honoring ==
In 1939, a monument was erected on Sichynsky's grave in Ivano-Frankivsk (sculptor M. Zorii); in 2000, a memorial architectural ensemble was opened in Kliuvyntsi (authors B. Bilous, M. Obeziuk, M. Samaryk); there is a museum room.

== Sources ==
- Костюк Н. Січинський Денис Володимирович // Шевченківська енциклопедія : у 6 т. / Гол. ред. М. Г. Жулинський. — Київ : Ін-т літератури ім. Т. Г. Шевченка, 2015. — Vol. 5 : Пе—С. — S. 782–783.
