= Verkhivtsi, Ternopil Oblast =

Rural locality in Ternopil Oblast, Ukraine

Verkhivtsi Верхівці
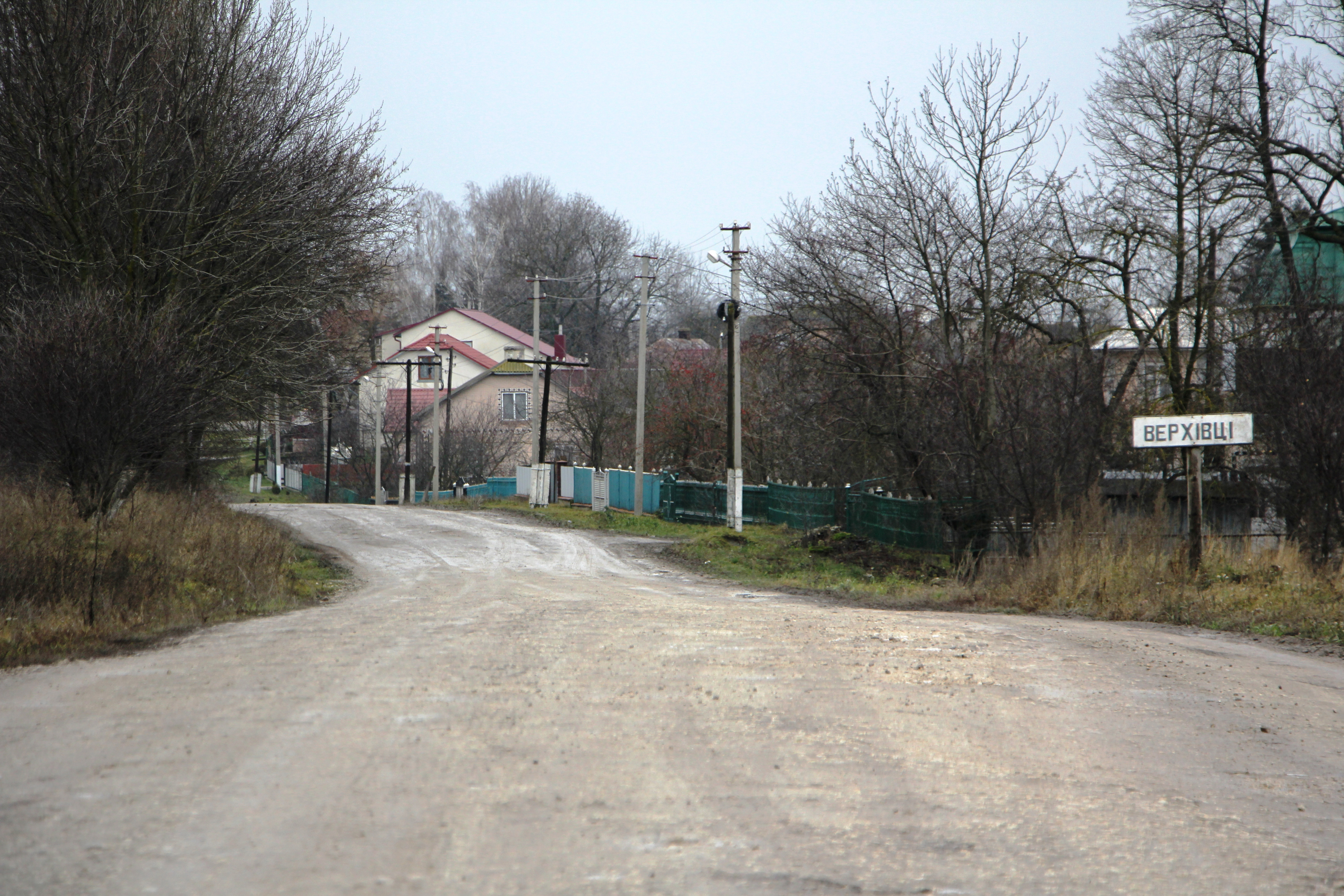

- Location in Ternopil Oblast
- Coordinates: 49°15′47″N 25°57′8″E
- Country: Ukraine
- Oblast: Ternopil Oblast
- Raion: Chortkiv Raion
- Hromada: Khorostkiv urban hromada
- Time zone: UTC+2 (EET)
  - Summer (DST): UTC+3 (EEST)
- Postal code: 48245

Verkhivtsi (Ukrainian: Верхівці) is a village in Khorostkiv urban hromada, Chortkiv Raion, Ternopil Oblast, Ukraine.

== History ==
The village has been known from the 16th century.

After the liquidation of the Husiatyn Raion on 19 July 2020, the village became part of the Chortkiv Raion.

== Religion ==
- Church of the Nativity of the Blessed Virgin Mary (1888; wooden).

== Sources ==
- (in Ukrainian) Галабінький В., Лашта, В., Верхівці // Ternopil Encyclopedic Dictionary: in 4 v. / editorial board: H. Yavorskyi and other, Ternopil: "Zbruch", 2004, V. 1: А—Й, S. 252. — ISBN 966-528-197-6.
- "Wierzchowce (pow. husiatyński)". Geographical Dictionary of the Kingdom of Poland (in Polish). 13. Warszawa: Kasa im. Józefa Mianowskiego. 1893. p. 410.
