= Khorostkiv =

City in Ternopil Oblast, Ukraine

Khorostkiv Хоростків
- City
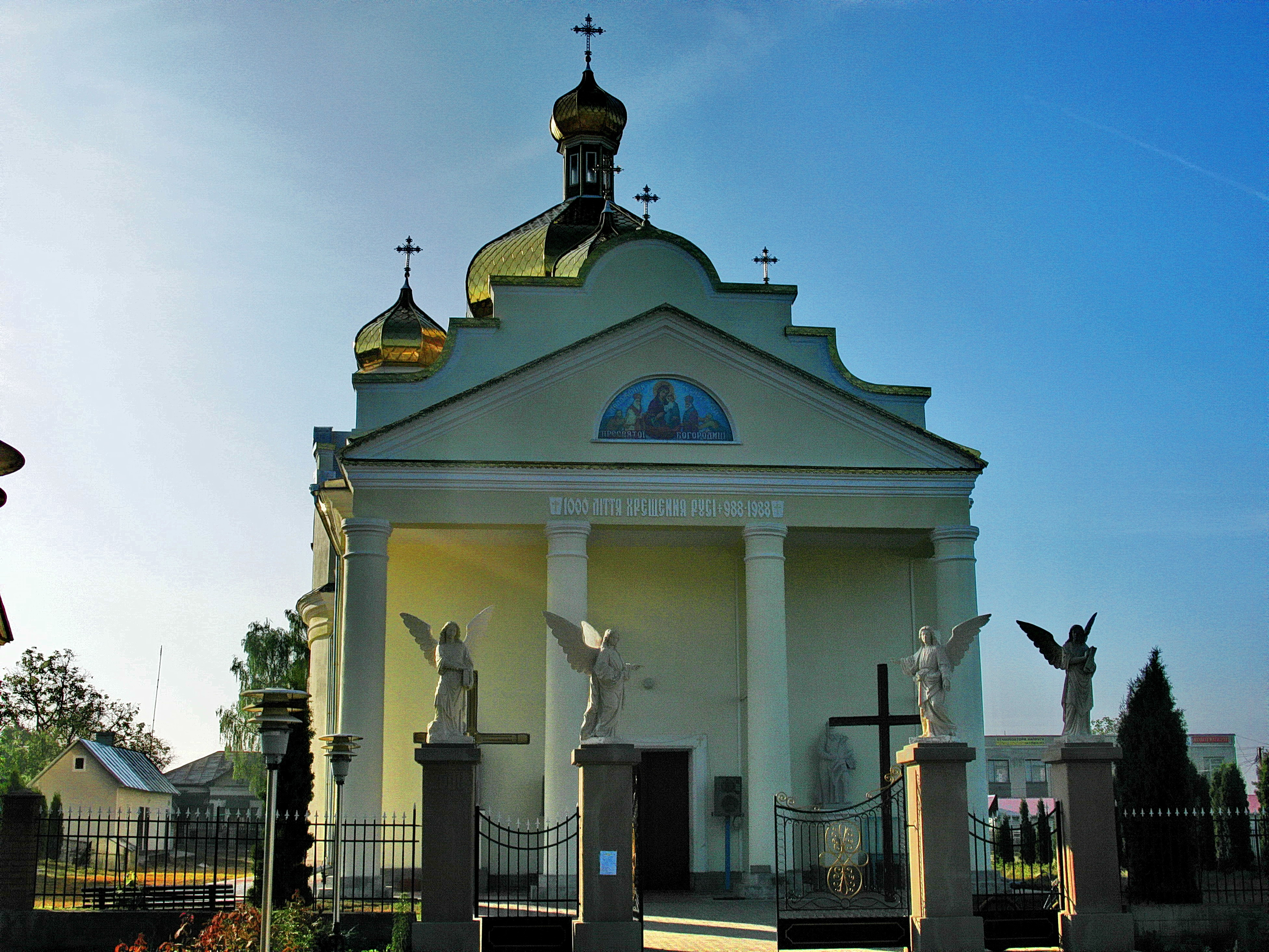
- Church of the Deposition of the Robe

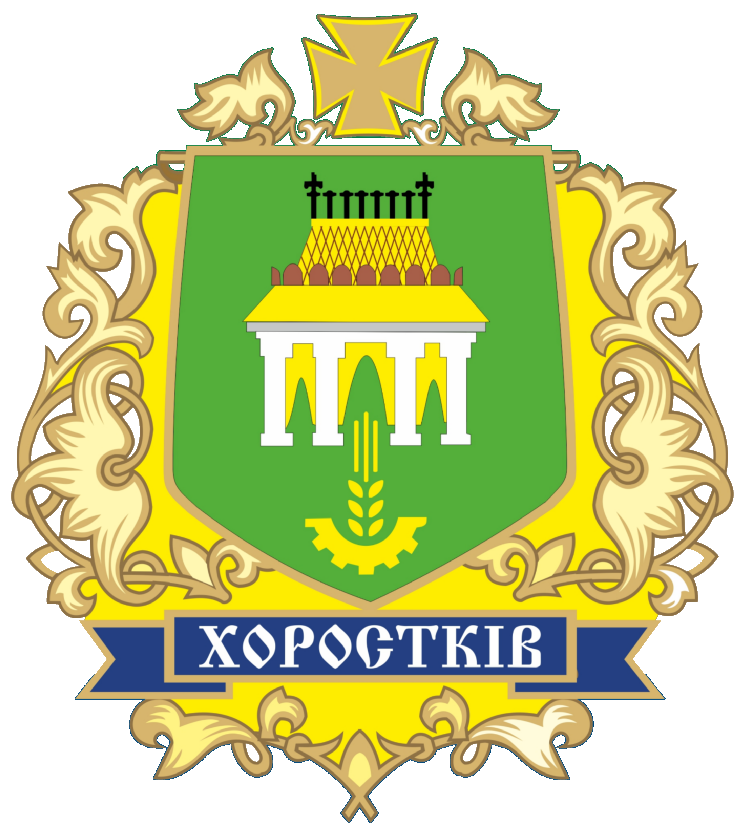
- Coat of arms

- Location within Ukraine Location within Ternopil Oblast
- Country: Ukraine
- Oblast: Ternopil Oblast
- Raion: Chortkiv Raion
- Hromada: Khorostkiv urban hromada

Population (2022)
  - Total: 6,652
- Time zone: UTC+2 (EET)
  - Summer (DST): UTC+3 (EEST)

Khorostkiv (Ukrainian: Хоростків, IPA: [xoˈrɔstkiu̯]; Polish: Chorostków; Yiddish: כראָסקעוו, romanized: Chorostkov) is a city in Chortkiv Raion, Ternopil Oblast, Ukraine. It hosts the administration of Khorostkiv urban hromada, one of the hromadas of Ukraine. Population: 6,652 (2022 estimate).

== History ==
In the Second Polish Republic, Khorostkiv, then known as Chorostków, belonged to the County of Kopczynce, Tarnopol Voivodeship. Following the First Partition of Poland in 1772, it became part of the Habsburg monarchy's Kingdom of Galicia and Lodomeria. Following the Peace of Schönbrunn in 1809, the area was ceded to the Russian Empire but was returned to the Habsburg monarchy as a result of the Congress of Vienna in 1815.

After the dissolution of Austria-Hungary in 1918, the area became part of the Second Polish Republic. After the Soviet invasion of Poland in 1939, it was incorporated into the Ukrainian SSR. Following the invasion of the Soviet Union by Nazi Germany in summer 1941, the area was administrated as part of the General Government. On July 30th 1941, 30 Jews were killed by the Einsatzgruppen and 110 Jews were killed by local collaborators. When the Soviet Union retook the area in 1944, the region returned to the Ukrainian SSR. Since the dissolution of the Ukrainian SSR and the Soviet Union in 1991, the area has been part of independent Ukraine.

In 1977, Khorostkiv was granted City status.

In January 1989 the population was 8811 people.

Until 18 July 2020, Khorostkiv belonged to Husiatyn Raion. The raion was abolished in July 2020 as part of the administrative reform of Ukraine, which reduced the number of raions of Ternopil Oblast to three. The area of Husiatyn Raion was merged into Chortkiv Raion.

== Notable people ==
- Jan Maszkowski (born 1793), painter, born here
- Stanislaw Stys (born 1896), Jesuit theologian, translator and scholar, born here
- Blume Lempel (1910-1999), Yiddish writer, born here

== Gallery ==
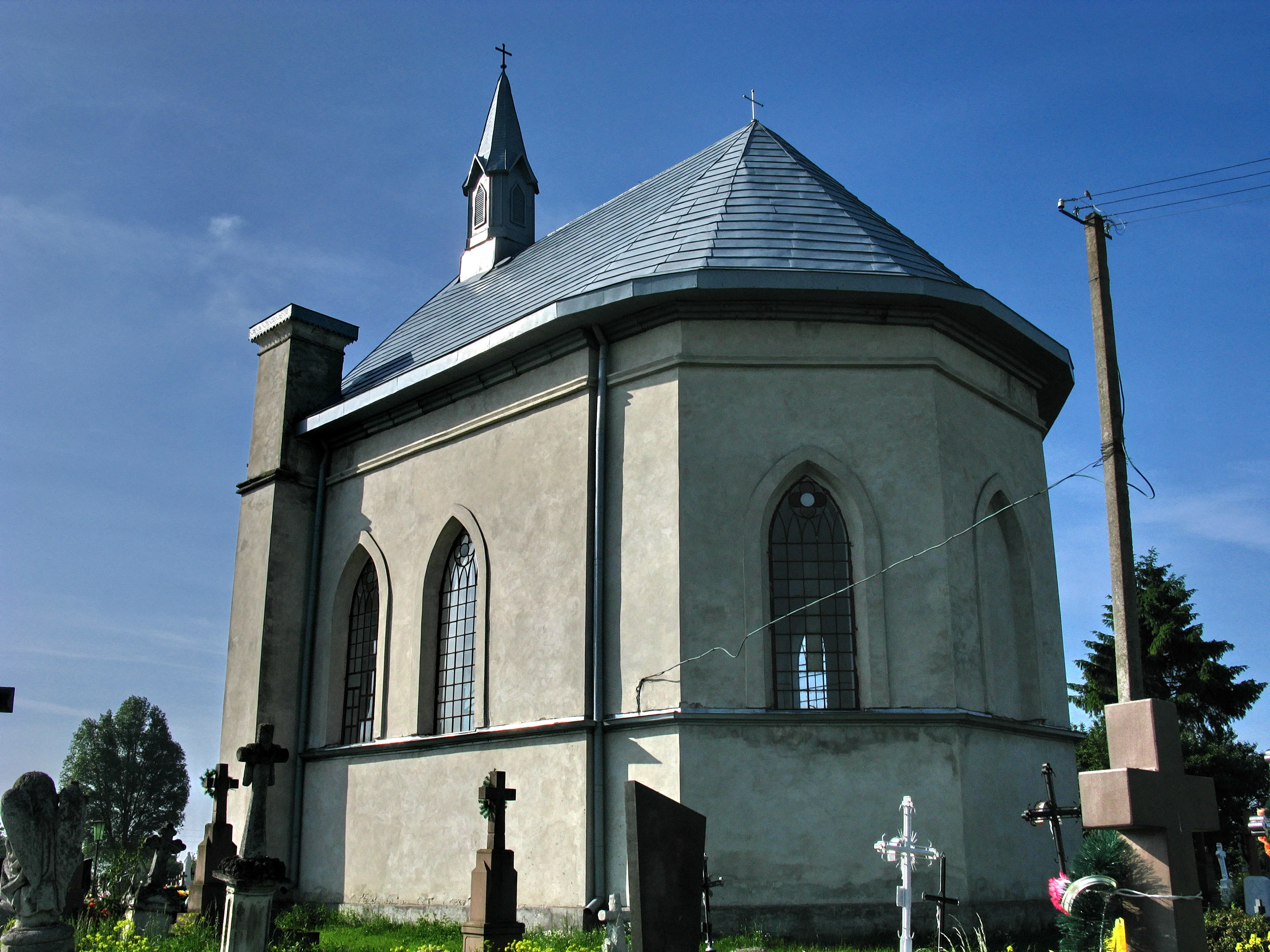
Chapel in Khorostkiv cemetery

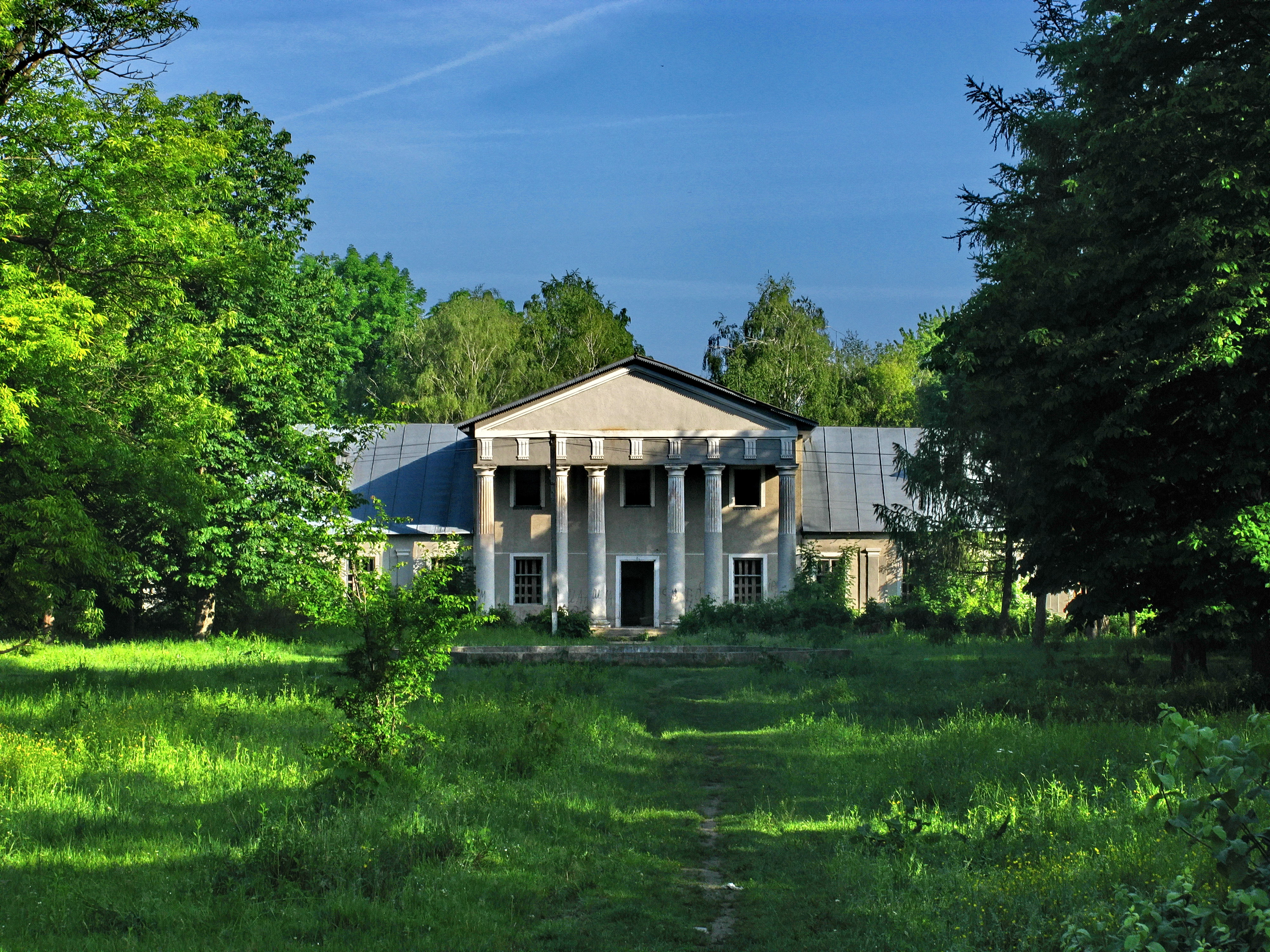
Abandoned dwór (mansion)

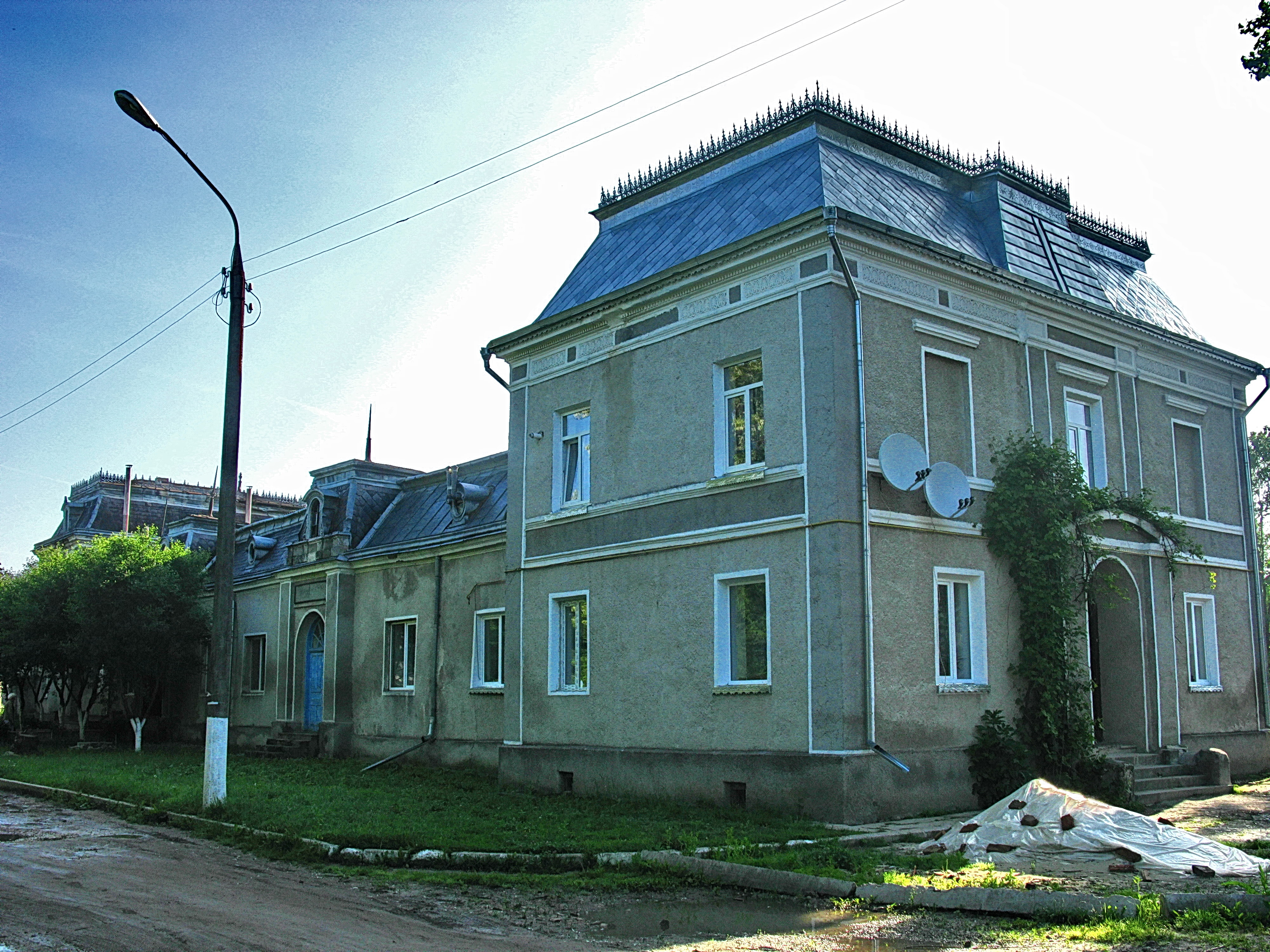
Former riding hall

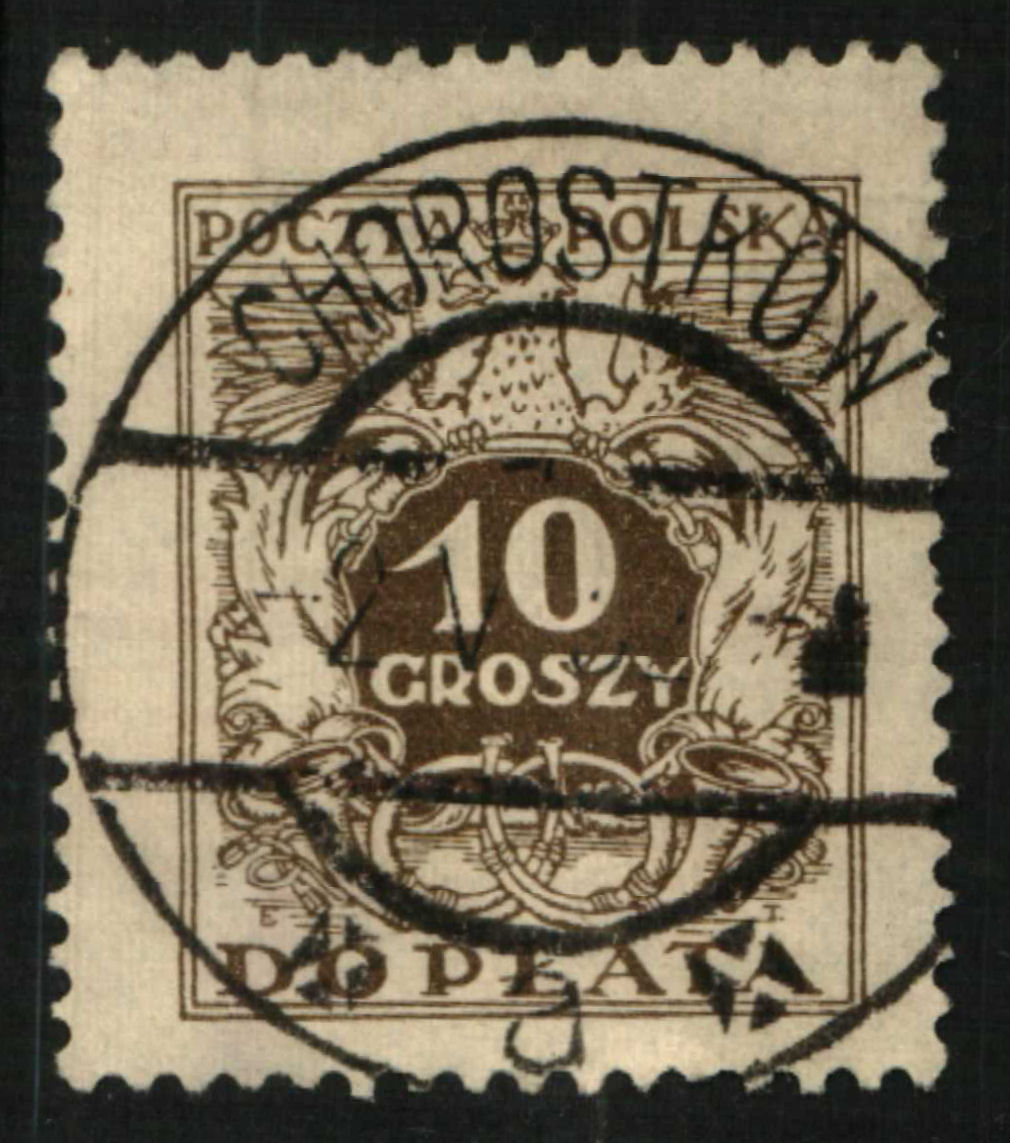
A postage due stamp of the Second Polish Republic issued in 1924, and cancelled in the town of Chorostkow
