= Karashyntsi =

Rural locality in Ternopil Oblast, Ukraine

Karashyntsi Карашинці
- Location in Ternopil Oblast
- Coordinates: 49°14′28″N 25°55′35″E
- Country: Ukraine
- Oblast: Ternopil Oblast
- Raion: Chortkiv Raion
- Hromada: Khorostkiv Hromada
- Time zone: UTC+2 (EET)
  - Summer (DST): UTC+3 (EEST)
- Postal code: 48281

Karashyntsi (Ukrainian: Карашинці) is a village in Khorostkiv urban hromada, Chortkiv Raion, Ternopil Oblast, Ukraine.

== History ==
The first written mention is from 1564.

== Religion ==
- Church of the Assumption (1998)
