= Abraham Sutzkever =

Belarusian-Israeli poet

- אַבֿרהם סוצקעווער
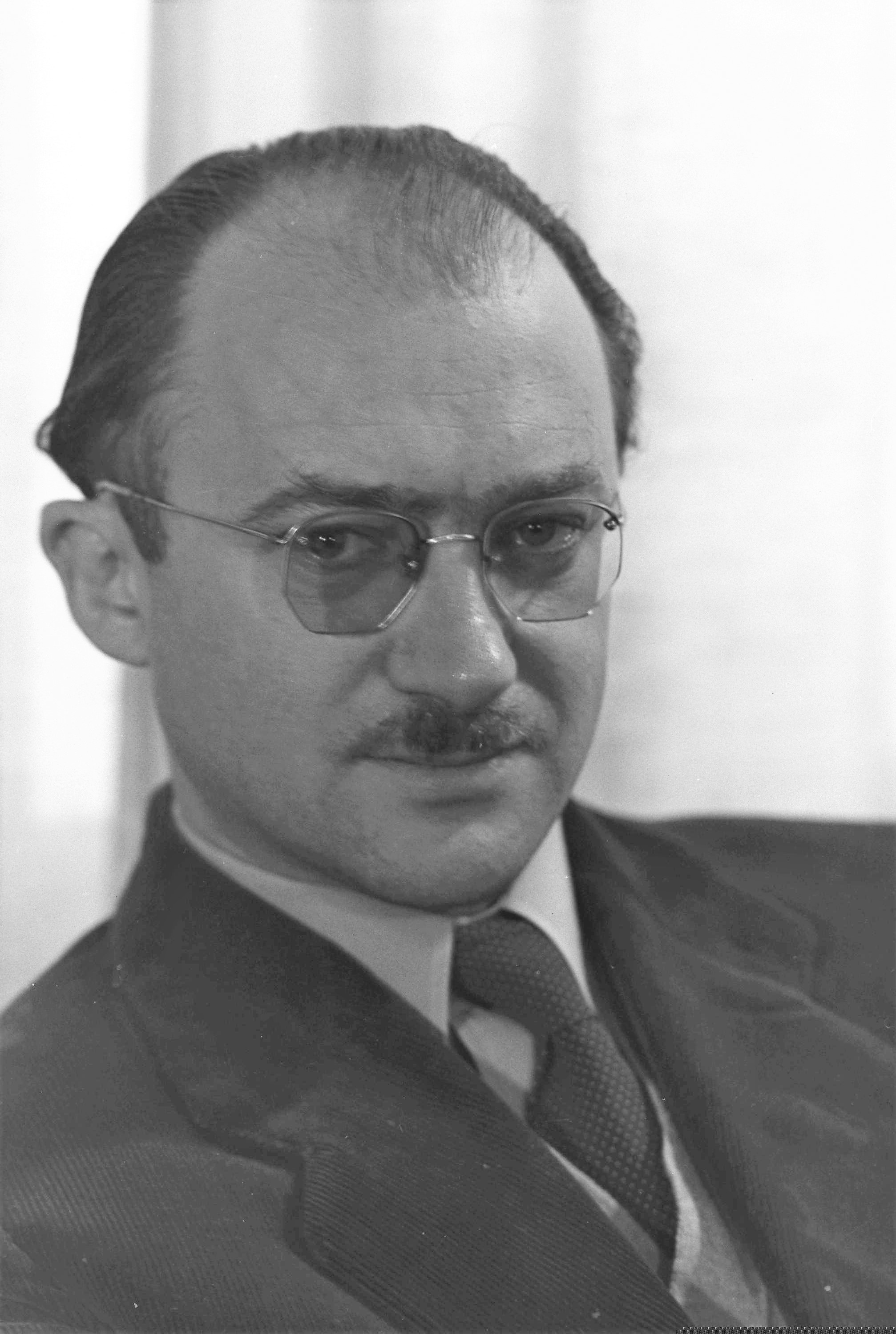
- Sutzkever in 1950
- Born: 15 July 1913; Smorgon, Vilna Governorate, Russian Empire
- Died: 20 January 2010 (aged 96); Tel Aviv, Israel
- Occupation: Poet
- Spouse: Freydke Sutzkever (died 2003)
- Children: 2
- Writing career
- Language: Yiddish
- Notable works: Lider (Songs); Valdiks (Of the Forest); Geheymshtot (Secret City); Di goldene keyt (The Golden Chain)
- Notable awards: Israel Prize (1985)

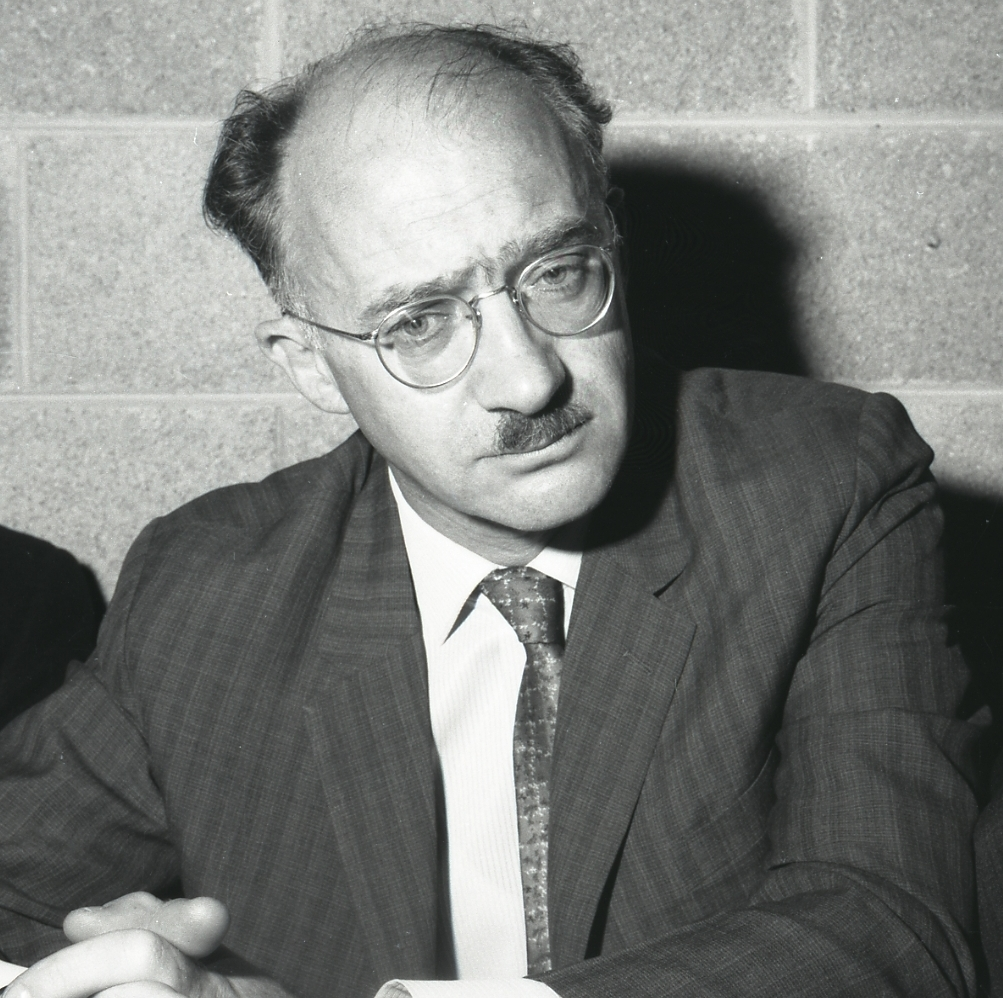
Abraham Sutzkever, 1962

Abraham Sutzkever (Yiddish: אַבֿרהם סוצקעווער, romanized: Avrom Sutskever; Hebrew: אברהם סוצקבר; July 15, 1913 – January 20, 2010) was an acclaimed Yiddish poet. The New York Times wrote that Sutzkever was "the greatest poet of the Holocaust."

== Biography ==
Abraham (Avrom) Sutzkever was born on July 15, 1913, in Smorgon, Vilna Governorate, Russian Empire, now Smarhon, Belarus. During World War I, his family moved to Omsk, Siberia, where his father, Hertz Sutzkever, died. In 1921, his mother, Rayne (née Fainberg), moved the family to Vilnius, where Sutzkever attended cheder.

Sutzkever attended the Polish Jewish high school Herzliah, audited university classes in Polish literature, and was introduced by a friend to Russian poetry. His earliest poems were written in Hebrew.

In 1930 Sutzkever joined the Jewish scouting organization, Bin ("Bee"), in whose magazine he published his first piece. There he also met his wife Freydke. In 1933, he became part of the writers’ and artists’ group Yung-Vilne, along with fellow poets Shmerke Kaczerginski, Chaim Grade, and Leyzer Volf.

He married Freydke in 1939, a day before the start of World War II.

In 1941, following the Nazi occupation of Vilnius, Sutzkever and his wife were sent to the Vilna Ghetto. Sutzkever and his friends hid a diary by Theodor Herzl, drawings by Marc Chagall and Alexander Bogen, and other treasured works behind plaster and brick walls in the ghetto. His mother and newborn son were murdered by the Nazis. On September 12, 1943, he and his wife escaped to the forests, and together with fellow Yiddish poet Shmerke Kaczerginski, he fought the occupying forces as a partisan. Sutzkever joined a Jewish unit and was smuggled into the Soviet Union.

Sutzkever's 1943 narrative poem, Kol Nidre, reached the Jewish Anti-Fascist Committee in Moscow, whose members included Ilya Ehrenburg and Solomon Mikhoels, as well as the exiled future president of Soviet Lithuania, Justas Paleckis. They implored the Kremlin to rescue him. So an aircraft located Sutzkever and Freydke in March 1944, and flew them to Moscow, where their daughter, Rina, was born.

Sutzkever testifies before the International Military Tribunal, 27 February 1946

In February 1946, he was called up as a witness at the Nuremberg trials, testifying against Franz Murer, the murderer of his mother and son. After a brief sojourn in Poland and Paris, he emigrated to Mandatory Palestine, arriving in Tel Aviv in 1942. Within seven years, Sutzkever founded Di goldene keyt (The Golden Chain).

Sutzkever was a keen traveller, touring South American jungles and African savannahs, where the sight of elephants and the song of a Basotho chief inspired more Yiddish verse.

Belatedly, in 1985 Sutzkever became the first Yiddish writer to win the prestigious Israel Prize for his literature. An English compendium appeared in 1991.

Freydke died in 2003. Abraham Sutzkever died on January 20, 2010, in Tel Aviv at the age of 96. Rina and another daughter, Mira, survive him, along with two grandchildren.

== Literary career ==
Sutzkever wrote poetry from an early age, initially in Hebrew. He published his first poem in Bin, the Jewish scouts magazine. Sutzkever was among the Modernist writers and artists of the Yung Vilne ("Young Vilna") group in the early 1930s. In 1937, his first volume of Yiddish poetry, Lider (Songs), was published by the Yiddish PEN International Club; a second, Valdiks (Of the Forest; 1940), appeared after he moved from Warsaw, during the interval of Lithuanian autonomy.

In Moscow, he wrote a chronicle of his experiences in the Vilna ghetto (Fun vilner geto,1946), a poetry collection Lider fun geto (1946; “Songs from the Ghetto”) and began Geheymshtot ("Secret City",1948), an epic poem about Jews hiding in the sewers of Vilna.

In 1949, Sutzkever founded the Yiddish literary quarterly Di goldene keyt, Israel's only Yiddish literary quarterly, which he edited until its demise in 1995. Sutzkever resuscitated the careers of Yiddish writers from Europe, the Americas, the Soviet Union and Israel. Many in the Zionist movement, however, dismissed Yiddish as a defeatist diaspora argot. "They will not uproot my tongue," he retorted. "I shall wake all generations with my roar."

Sutzkever's poetry was translated into Hebrew by Nathan Alterman, Avraham Shlonsky and Leah Goldberg. In the 1930s, his work was translated into Russian by Boris Pasternak. Selected poems in Russian translation of Igor Bulatovsky were published in 2010.

== Works ==
- Di festung (1945; “The Fortress”)
- About a Herring (1946)
- Yidishe gas (1948; “Jewish Street”)
- Sibir (1953; "Siberia")
- In midber Sinai (1957; "In the Sinai Desert")
- Di fidlroyz (1974; "The Fiddle Rose: Poems 1970–1972")
- Griner akvaryum (1975; “Green Aquarium”)
- Fun alte un yunge ksav-yadn (1982; "Laughter Beneath the Forest: Poems from Old and New Manuscripts")

== Works in English translation ==
- Siberia: A Poem, translated by Jacob Sonntag in 1961, part of the UNESCO Collection of Representative Works.
- Burnt Pearls : Ghetto Poems of Abraham Sutzkever, translated from the Yiddish by Seymour Mayne; introduction by Ruth R. Wisse. Oakville, Ont.: Mosaic Press, 1981. ISBN 0-88962-142-X
- The Fiddle Rose: Poems, 1970-1972, Abraham Sutzkever; selected and translated by Ruth Whitman; drawings by Marc Chagall; introduction by Ruth R. Wisse. Detroit: Wayne State University Press, 1990. ISBN 0-8143-2001-5
- A. Sutzkever: Selected Poetry and Prose, translated from the Yiddish by Barbara and Benjamin Harshav; with an introduction by Benjamin Harshav. Berkeley: University of California Press, 1991. ISBN 0-520-06539-5
- Laughter Beneath the Forest : Poems from Old and Recent Manuscripts by Abraham Sutzkever; translated from the Yiddish by Barnett Zumoff; with an introductory essay by Emanuel S. Goldsmith. Hoboken, NJ: KTAV Publishing, 1996. ISBN 0-88125-555-6
- Sutzkever Essential Prose; translated from the Yiddish by Zackary Sholem Berger (A Yiddish Book Center Translation); with an introduction by Heather Valencia. Amherst, MA: White Goat Press, 2020. ISBN 978-1-7343872-6-1

== Awards and recognition ==
- 1969: Itzik Manger Prize for Yiddish literature.
- 1985: Israel Prize for Yiddish literature.

Sutzkever's poems have been translated into 30 languages.

== Recordings ==
- Hilda Bronstein, A Vogn Shikh, lyrics by Avrom Sutzkever, music by Tomas Novotny Yiddish Songs Old and New, ARC Records
- Karsten Troyke, Leg den Kopf auf meine Knie, lyrics by Selma Meerbaum-Eisinger, Itzik Manger and Abraham Sutzkever, music by Karsten Troyke
- Abraham Sutzkever, The Poetry of Abraham Sutzkever (Vilno Poet): Read in Yiddish, produced by Ruth Wise on Folkways Records

== Compositions ==
- "The Twin-Sisters" - "Der Tsvilingl", music by Daniel Galay, text by Avrum Sutzkever. Narrator (Yiddish) Michael Ben-Avraham, The Israeli String Quartet for Contemporary Music (Violin, Viola, Cello), percussion, piano. First performance: Tel-Aviv 2/10/2003 on the 90th birthday of Avrum Sutzkever.
- "The Seed of Dream", music by Lori Laitman, based on poems by Abraham Sutzkever as translated by C.K. Williams and Leonard Wolf. Commissioned by The Music of Remembrance organization in Seattle. First performed in May 2005 at Benaroya Hall in Seattle by baritone Erich Parce, pianist Mina Miller, and cellist Amos Yang. Recent performance on January 28, 2008, by the Chamber Music Society of Southwest Florida by mezzo-soprano Janelle McCoy, cellist Adam Satinsky and pianist Bella Gutshtein of the Russian Music Salon.
- Sutzkever's poem "Poezye" was set to music by composer Alex Weiser as a part of his song cycle "and all the days were purple."

== See also ==
- List of Israel Prize recipients
- Alexander Bogen
- Paper Brigade
