= George Weed =

George Weed may refer to:

- George S. Weed (1862–1919), American lawyer and politician from New York
- George L. Weed (1857–1916), American politician from New York
