= Jewish Book Council =

American Jewish organization

- המועצה למען הספר היהודי באמריקה
- Abbreviation: JBC
- Formation: 1943
- Founder: Fanny Goldstein
- Type: Not-for-profit 501(c)(3)
- Legal status: Active
- Headquarters: New York City
- Region served: Worldwide
- Services: Promoting the reading, writing, publishing, and distribution of English-language Jewish literature
- Executive Director: Naomi Firestone-Teeter
- Website: jewishbookcouncil.org

The Jewish Book Council (Hebrew: המועצה למען הספר היהודי באמריקה), founded in 1943, is an American organization encouraging and contributing to Jewish literature. The goal of the council, as stated on its website, is "to promote the reading, writing and publishing of quality English language books of Jewish content in North America". The council sponsors the National Jewish Book Awards, the JBC Network, JBC Book Clubs, the Visiting Scribe series, and Jewish Book Month. It previously sponsored the Sami Rohr Prize for Jewish Literature. It publishes an annual literary journal called Paper Brigade.

== History ==
The Jewish Book Council (JBC)'s origins date to 1925, when Fanny Goldstein, a librarian at the West End Branch of the Boston Public Library, curated an exhibit of Judaic books to encourage book giving during the Jewish holiday of Chanukah as a focus of what she dubbed "Jewish Book Week". She repeated the exhibit in 1926, inspiring a call by Rabbi S. Felix Mendelssohn of Chicago for the observance of a Jewish book week. In 1927, with Mendelssohn's assistance, Jewish communities across the United States adopted the event. Jewish Book Week proved so successful that in 1940 the National Committee for Jewish Book Week was founded, with Goldstein as chairperson. Dr. Mordecai Soltes succeeded her one year later. Representatives of major American Jewish organizations served on this committee, as did groups interested in promulgating Yiddish and Hebrew literature.

Jewish Book Week activities proliferated and were extended to one month in 1943. At the same time, the National Committee for Jewish Book Week became the Jewish Book Council, reflecting its broader scope. In March 1944, the National Jewish Welfare Board, which would ultimately become the Jewish Community Centers Association (JCCA), entered into an agreement with the Book Council to become its official sponsor and coordinating organization, providing financial support and organizational assistance. This arrangement reflected the realization that local JCCs were the primary site of community book fairs. While under the auspices of the JCCA, the Jewish Book Council maintained an executive board, composed of representatives from major American Jewish organizations and leading figures in the literary world.

On January 1, 1994, the Jewish Book Council became an independent non-profit organization, splitting off from the JCCA. The Council's executive board voted to create an independent entity. Under executive director Carolyn Starman Hessel from 1994 to 2015, who had been called the "Jewish Oprah", JBC's activities and influence grew. Hessel is credited with launching the careers of Nathan Englander, Myla Goldberg, Nicole Krauss and Jonathan Safran Foer by selecting them and sending them on tours of the Jewish book fairs.

On April 1, 2015, Naomi Firestone-Teeter, who had been with JBC since 2006, succeeded Hessel.

In response to the Boycott, Divestment and Sanctions movement within the literary world during the Gaza war, the JBC began an initiative to encourage Jewish community authors and readers to support Jewish books and authors. In 2026, a group of 42 anti-Zionist and non-Zionist Jewish authors published an open letter criticizing the JBC for what they say was "narrowing its vision to a Zionist approach to Jewish culture". JBC CEO Naomi Firestone-Teeter stated she had engaged in good faith with the authors and said the letter was a "difference in expectations" about what it can stand for.

== Publications ==
=== Jewish Book World ===
From 1942 through 1999, the council published an annual journal called the Jewish Book Annual that reflected on "the year’s events, figures, works, and community interests impacting Jewish literature and literacy." In 1999, the journal became the Jewish Book World, a quarterly magazine published until 2015.

Jewish Book World was a quarterly magazine published by the JBC from 1982 to 2015. It was devoted to the promotion of books of Jewish interest. Jewish Book World reached over 5,000 readers with a specific interest in Jewish books, including library professionals, book festival coordinators, book group members, academicians, and lay leaders. The magazine was a tool to help them learn about new books of Jewish interest and make informed reading choices. Often called "the Publishers Weekly of Jewish literature", Jewish Book World brought the world of Jewish books to interested readers. Jewish Book World began as a twelve-page pamphlet that was circulated to Jewish Community Centers, featuring short blurbs on approximately 50 new books of Jewish interest. In 1994, Jewish Book World expanded from a pamphlet to a full-length magazine that was published three times a year. Jewish Book World appeared quarterly and included reviews of over 120 books per issue, updates on literary events and industry news, author profiles, and articles on the world of Jewish books.

=== Paper Brigade ===
JBC's annual literary magazine Paper Brigade is named in honor of the group of writers and intellectuals in the Vilna Ghetto who rescued thousands of Jewish books and documents from Nazi destruction. Each issue provides a 200-page snapshot of the Jewish literary landscape in America and abroad, including essays, fiction, poetry, and visual arts.

== National Jewish Book Awards ==
The National Jewish Book Awards is the longest-running North American awards program of its kind in the field of Jewish literature and is recognized as the most prestigious. The awards, presented by category, are designed to give recognition to outstanding books, to stimulate writers to further literary creativity and to encourage the reading of worthwhile titles.

The National Jewish Book Awards program began in 1950 when the Jewish Book Council presented awards to authors of Jewish books at its annual meeting. The first book awarded the prize was Philo: Foundations of Religious Philosophy in Judaism, Christianity and Islam by Harry Austryn Wolfson. Among the past notable literary winners are Deborah Lipstadt, Etgar Keret, Bari Weiss, Sonia Levitin, Howard Fast, Chaim Grade, Samuel Heilman, John Hersey, Bernard Malamud, Cynthia Ozick, Chaim Potok, Philip Roth, Arthur A. Cohen, I.B. Singer, Michael Chabon, Lauren Belfer, Elie Wiesel, Michael Oren, and Jonathan Safran Foer.

=== Everett Family Foundation Jewish Book of the Year Award ===
In addition to the category awards, every year since 2002, one non-fiction book has been selected as the winner of the Everett Family Foundation Jewish Book of the Year Award. Winners have included Daniel Gordis, Jeremy Eichler, Michael W. Twitty, Nomi M. Stolzenberg and David N. Myers, Dvora Hacohen, and Jonathan Sacks.

Journalist Lee Yaron's account of the October 7 attacks, 10/7: 100 Human Stories, won the 2024 award, making her the youngest author to win.

== Jewish Book Month ==
Jewish Book Month is an annual event sponsored by the JBC in the month before the Chanukah gift-giving season (roughly during the month of November). Major cities with Jewish communities, albeit not in New York, sponsor book fairs and feature lectures by visiting authors. For the industry, they are a major marketing tool. According to Publishers Weekly book fairs generate over $3 million in annual revenue. For many years the JBC held its annual meeting simultaneously with Book Expo America, enabling Jewish book fair planners to look over the forthcoming books and meet the authors. In 2004, this system was replaced by an annual meeting of the Jewish Book Network coordinated by the JBC.

The annual meeting is, effectively, an annual author's audition. The New York Times calls it, "a bizarre rite of passage: the Jewish book tour casting call." Jeffrey Goldberg characterized the audition as an experience "somewhere between JDate and a camel auction." Authors of books that range from serious works of religious history to comic novels stand and speak for precisely two minutes to an audience of over one hundred organizers of Jewish book fairs and lecture series. Getting signed to a tour of these venues is said to have the power not merely to launch a Jewish-themed book, but to lift titles from Jewish to general success.

== JBC Network ==
The JBC Network is a membership organization of over 120 participating sites, JCCs, synagogues, Hillels, Jewish Federations and other related organizations that host Jewish book programs. Through the Network, the Jewish Book Council is able to provide extensive resources to the program coordinators, including introduction to authors interested in touring Jewish book festivals, advice from experts on topics that affect a book program, and a chance to learn from the experiences of others in the field.

Jewish books are an essential part of Jewish culture. Programming for Jewish book events is a vital component. In recent years, the Jewish book festivals have grown into a $3 million industry. The Jewish Book Network goes a long way towards assisting in the preparation of successful events and connecting authors of Jewish interest books with the coordinators of these programs.

The Jewish Book Council formed the JBC Network in 1999 to serve as a central address for book programming. It functions on a year-round basis, although the primary focus remains on the Fall Jewish Book Month season. The Jewish Book Council assists with program suggestions and coordinates the speaking tours of more than 260 authors who travel country-wide during the Fall season and throughout the year. The Jewish Book Council annually prepares a book providing information about the authors on tour.

Each year the Jewish Book Council sponsors a conference for all JBC Network members and their lay leaders in conjunction with the annual BookExpo America. This conference begins the new season of book festival planning. In addition to workshops and networking among the Network members, the annual conference includes a program called Meet the Author. Through this event, authors are invited to speak to the members of the JBC Network in the hopes of touring and visiting with the Jewish book programs that are represented. Among the authors who were sponsored in the past are Warren Bass, Rich Cohen, Nathan Englander, Samuel G. Freedman, Jonathan Safran Foer, Myla Goldberg, Ari L. Goldman, Rabbi Irving Greenberg, Dara Horn, David Horowitz, Dr. Eric Kandel, Nicole Krauss, Rabbi Harold Kushner, Aaron Lansky, Daniel Libeskind, Tova Mirvis, Dr. Deborah Dash Moore, Judea Pearl, Naomi Ragen, Nessa Rapoport, Shulamit Reinharz, Steven V. Roberts, Jonathan Rosen, Ambassador Dennis Ross, and Dr. Jonathan Sarna.

== Sami Rohr Prize ==
From 2006 to 2020, JBC administered the Sami Rohr Prize, and annual $100,000 prize awarded to the finest works of Jewish interest. Established in 2006 by Sami Rohr's descendants on his 80th birthday, it is one of the richest literary prizes in the world. It alternates between fiction and non-fiction. The award was given in association with the Jewish Book Council until 2020 and is now administered by the National Library of Israel.

== See also ==
- List of winners of the National Jewish Book Award
- Jewish Book Week
