= Paper Brigade =

1940s resistance organisation in Vilna

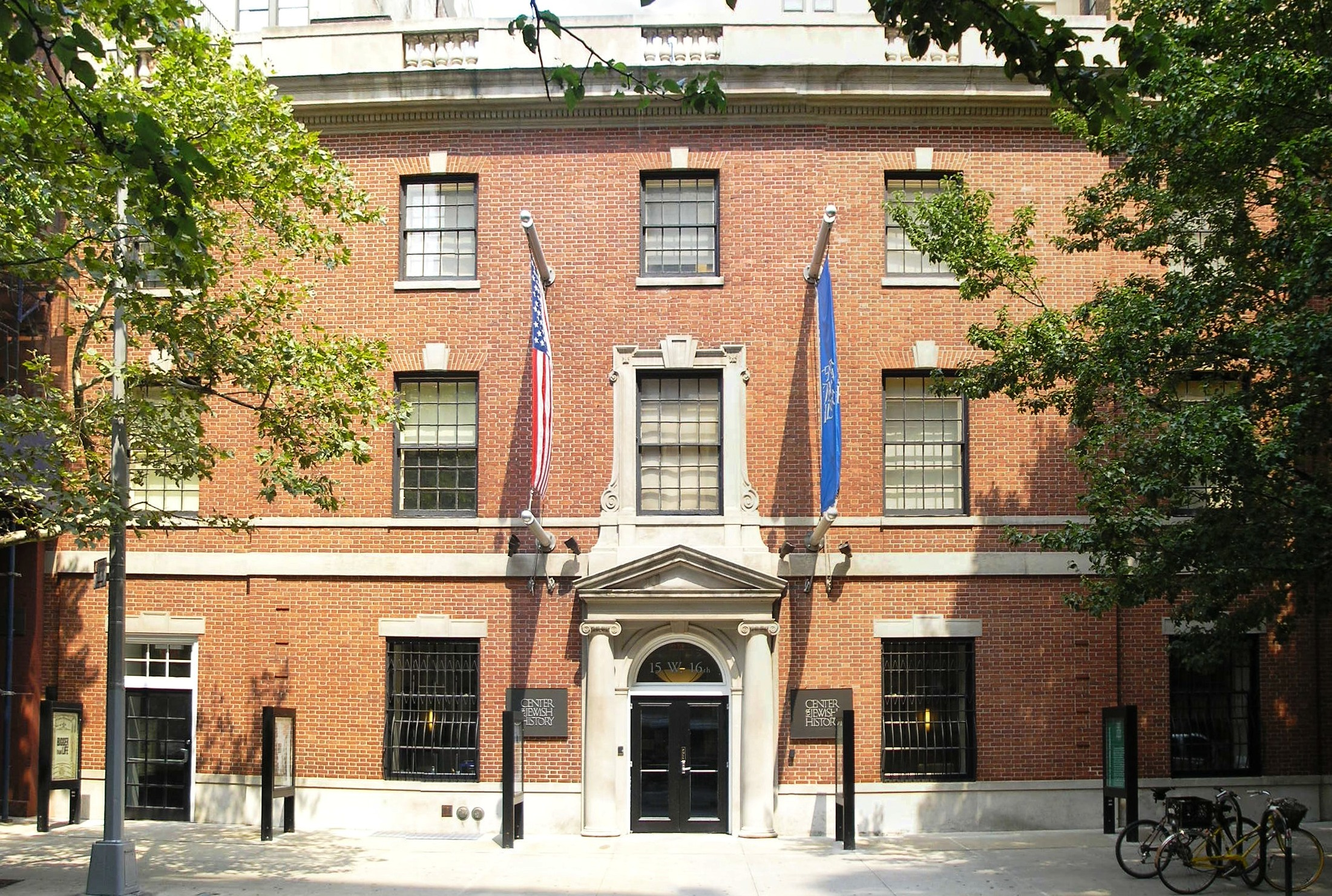
The current headquarters of YIVO, whose archives the Brigade helped save

The Paper Brigade was the name given to a group of residents of the Vilna Ghetto who hid a large cache of Jewish cultural items from YIVO (the Yiddish Scientific Institute), saving them from destruction or theft by Nazi Germany. Established in 1942 and led by Abraham Sutzkever and Shmerke Kaczerginski, the group smuggled books, paintings and sculptures past Nazi guards and hid them in various locations in and around the Ghetto. After the Ghetto's liquidation, surviving members of the group fled to join the Jewish partisans, eventually returning to Vilna following its liberation by Soviet forces. Recovered works were used to establish the Vilna Jewish Museum and then smuggled to the United States, where YIVO had re-established itself during the 1940s. Caches of hidden material continued to be discovered in Vilna into the early 1990s. Despite losses during both the Nazi and Soviet eras, 30–40 percent of the YIVO archive was preserved, which now represents "the largest collection of material about Jewish life in Eastern Europe that exists in the world".

== YIVO and the Brigade ==
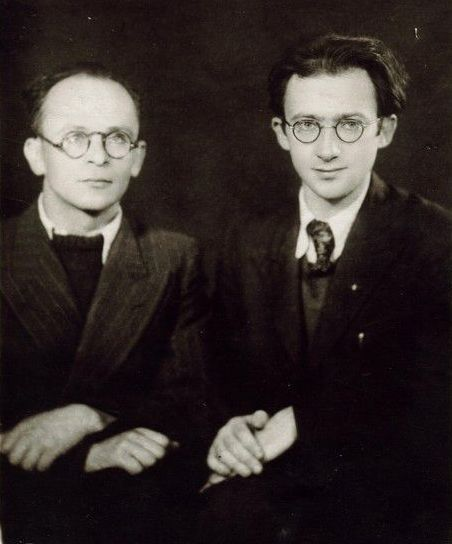
Shmerke Kaczerginski (left) and Abraham Sutzkever (right), leaders of the Paper Brigade, in 1930s

Prior to the Second World War, the city of Vilna was a hub of Jewish activity and learning, to the point where it was nicknamed the "Jerusalem of Lithuania". Seen as the central melting pot of Jewish tradition and Yiddish culture, the city was the home of YIVO, an organisation established in 1925 to preserve and promote Yiddish culture. Based in the Pohulanka district, YIVO maintained an extensive archive of Yiddish language works and other books relating to Jewish culture and history in its headquarters. With the capture of Vilna by Soviet forces on 19 September 1939, the organisation was (in sequence) taken over by Soviet forces, with Moyshe Lerer installed as leader, allowed to exist independently under Lithuanian supervision, and then finally absorbed by the Soviet-sponsored Institute of Lithuanian Studies in June 1940. Despite these changes, the YIVO collection remained intact, and was in some respects expanded by the inclusion of books whose owners were fleeing the war. With the launch of Operation Barbarossa in 1941, Nazi forces advanced into Soviet-occupied territory, capturing Vilna—and by extension, the YIVO archives—on 24 June.

Shortly thereafter Dr. Johannes Pohl, a representative of the Einsatzstab Reichsleiter Rosenberg (ERR)—the Nazi organisation tasked with stealing or destroying Jewish cultural property—arrived in Vilna to examine the archives. He ordered that Vilna be made a central collection point for the region, incorporating not only the archives of YIVO and other Vilna institutions but private collections from Kaunas, Šiauliai, Marijampolė, Valozhyn and other towns. The Nazis then established a sorting office in 1942 to go through the resulting material, selecting high-quality items to be shipped to the Institute for Study of the Jewish Question: the remainder were to be pulped. ERR orders stated that a maximum of 30 percent of works could be deemed of high quality and saved. To ensure that the right works were selected, Jewish Ghetto inmates, largely people with some involvement with YIVO, were selected to do the sorting work. Labourers included Zelig Kalmanovich, Uma Olkenicki, Abraham Sutzkever, Shmerke Kaczerginski and Khaykel Lunski.

... the evil ones undertook to transform [the YIVO headquarters at] Wiwulskiego 18 into a Ponar for Jewish culture, and they ordered a few dozen Jews from the Vilna ghetto to dig graves for our soul.

— Abraham Sutzkever

The concept of destroying the YIVO archives and associated material was profoundly traumatising to the labourers; in his diaries, Herman Kruk wrote that they were "in tears. ... YIVO is dying. Its mass grave is the paper mill". Nicknamed the "Paper Brigade" the labourers, led by Sutzkever and Kaczerginski, began sabotaging the ERR's plans. The Brigade initially engaged in passive resistance by simply refusing to work, reading aloud from the books rather than destroying them—Kaczerginski and Sutzkever later published volumes of poetry that they had written instead of doing the actual sorting work. From there, they accelerated to smuggling the works to safety. Some books were smuggled on their person when they returned home each night from the sorting office, and hidden in caches within houses, bunkers and secret compartments within the Ghetto; others were handed off to trustworthy non-Jews outside the Ghetto, such as the librarian Ona Šimaitė, or hidden in the attic of the YIVO building, which also served as a transit point for weapons for armed resistance. Military manuals, largely Russian, were also identified and smuggled to Jewish partisans within the Vilna Ghetto. With the liquidation of the Ghetto in September 1943, the immediate work of the Paper Brigade came to an end. Many members were killed by the Nazis, but both Sutzkever and Kaczerginski managed to escape, hiding with the Jewish partisans.

== Cache recovery ==
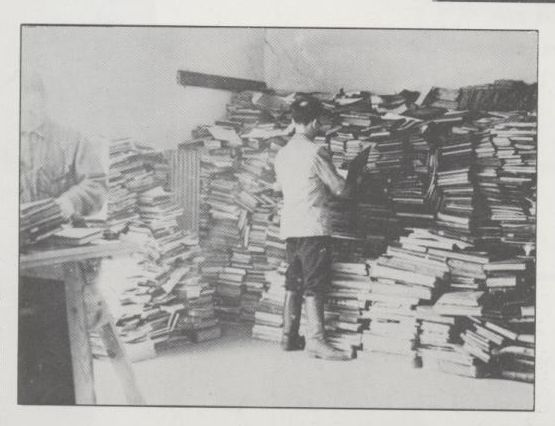
Shmerke Kaczerginski with saved books

After Vilna was captured from the Nazis on 13 July 1944, Sutzkever returned to the city in the company of Justas Paleckis. Quickly joined by Kaczerginski and Abba Kovner, the group opened a Jewish Museum on 26 July and began enlisting anyone available to hunt for the hidden caches. Initial results were mixed: the YIVO building had been destroyed by bombing, and the largest cache in the Vilna Ghetto had been discovered by the German forces shortly before their retreat and burnt. Many other repositories survived, and locals who had been given works to hide by Jewish residents quickly arrived to return them. Early discoveries included the handwritten diaries of Theodor Herzl, a sculpture of David by Mark Antokolsky, and letters by Sholem Aleichem, I. L. Peretz and many others. Their work proceeded rapidly, and with much enthusiasm from the surviving Jewish communities of Eastern Europe. Sutzkever's return to Russia in 1944, followed by Kovner's move to Palestine, left Kaczerginski in charge of the museum and recovery project.

Although the Museum was theoretically supported by Lithuanian and Soviet authorities, they provided few resources, assigning the organisers no budget and only giving them a burnt out former Ghetto building as a headquarters. Following the end of the war in 1945, it became clear that the volunteers' work was incompatible with the priorities of Soviet authorities, who burnt 30 tons of YIVO materials and, having demanded that any publicly displayed books be reviewed by a censor, simply refused to return any submitted works. Accordingly, Kaczerginski and the others prepared to smuggle the collection yet again—this time to the United States, where YIVO had established a new headquarters. Volunteers took the books across the border to Poland, enlisting the help of Bricha contacts to move them into non-Soviet Europe. From there much of the material went to New York; Sutzkever held on to some of it, which was later given to the National Library of Israel.

The Museum was finally shut down by the KGB in 1949; some of the remaining material was destroyed, while the remainder was moved to the Lithuanian Central State Archives, the Vilna Gaon Jewish State Museum, and the Lithuanian National Library. Following the end of the Soviet Union, YIVO successfully negotiated with the Lithuanian government to produce copies of approximately 100,000 pages of this material. A further archive, containing 150,000 documents, was discovered in 1991 having been hidden in a church by Antanas Ulpis. In total, it is estimated the Brigade saved 30–40 percent of the YIVO archives. Additional works – those confiscated, rather than hidden by the Brigade – were discovered in 1954 in the building of a former bank in Vienna, and returned to YIVO.

== See also ==
- Jewish literature
- David Fishman

== Bibliography ==
- Biga, Leo (2007). "Blumkin Resident's Son: Collector of Collectors of Jewish Artifacts at Yivo". The Jewish Press. OCLC 926110851.
- Collins, Donald E.; Rothfeder, Herbert P. (1983). "The Einsatzstab Reichleiter Rosenberg and the Looting of Jewish and Masonic Libraries During World War II". The Journal of Library History. 18 (1): 21–36. ISSN 0275-3650. JSTOR 25541351.
- Dolsten, Josefin (15 November 2017). "5 amazing discoveries from a trove of documents hidden during the Holocaust". Jewish Telegraphic Agency. Archived from the original on 12 February 2018.
- Evelyn, Adunka (2002). The Nazi looting of books in Austria and their partial restitution. Czemin. ISBN 9783707601381.
- Fishman, David (1996). "Those Daring Escapades of Vilna's 'Papir Brigade': How a Yiddish Poet and His Crew Rescued Judaica". Forward.
- Fishman, David E. (2016). "The Last "Zamlers": Avrom Sutzkever and Shmerke Kaczerginski in Vilna, 1944-1945". In Veidlinger, Jeffrey (ed.). Going to the People: Jews and the Ethnographic Impulse. Indiana University Press. ISBN 9780253019080.
- Fishman, David E. (2017). The Book Smugglers: Partisans, Poets, and the Race to Save Jewish Treasures from the Nazis. ISBN 9781512603309.
- Glickman, Mark (2016). Stolen Words: The Nazi Plunder of Jewish Books. University of Nebraska Press. ISBN 978-0827612082.
- Kuznitz, Cecile Esther (2014). YIVO and the making of modern Jewish culture: scholarship for the Yiddish nation. Cambridge University Press. ISBN 9781107014206.
- Rydell, Anders (2017). The Book Thieves: The Nazi Looting of Europe's Libraries and the Race to Return a Literary Inheritance. New York: Viking. ISBN 9780735221222.
- Shavit, David (1997). Hunger for the Printed Word: Books and Libraries in the Jewish Ghettos of Nazi-Occupied Europe. McFarland & Co. ISBN 0786402032.
- Weeks, Theodore R. (2008). "Remembering and Forgetting: Creating a Soviet Lithuanian Capital". Journal of Baltic Studies. 39 (4). doi:10.1080/01629770802461548. ISSN 1751-7877. S2CID 144016094.
