= Tates, mames, kinderlekh =

1920s Yiddish socialist song

Song
- Released: 1926
- Songwriter: Shmerke Kaczerginski

Tates, mames, kinderlekh (Yiddish: טאַטעס מאַמעס קינדערלעך, lit. 'Fathers, mothers, children'), also known as Barikadn (Yiddish: באַריקאַדן, lit. 'Barricades'), is a Yiddish song from the 1920s associated with the socialist General Jewish Labour Bund movement. The song describes a workers' strike in Łódź; as men, women and children joined in to construct barricades in the streets of the city. Tates, mames, kinderlekh was written by Shmerke Kaczerginski, who later became a Communist Party activist and a partisan fighter. Kaczerginski was only 15 years old at the time the song was written in 1926. The song rapidly became widely popular in the Jewish community in Poland.

== Recordings ==
- "In Love And In Struggle: The Musical Legacy Of The Jewish Labor Bund", featuring Zalmen Mlotek, Adrienne Cooper, Dan Rous with The New Yiddish Chorale and The Workmen's Circle Chorus, 1999 [translates the lyrics into English] Recording
- "The Klezmatics - On Holy Ground", The Klezmatics, 2010 Recording
- "A Tribute to Vilna", Jewish Labour Bund Melbourne, 2013 Recording
- "In Der Heym/Down Home", Michael Alpert & Craig Judelman, 2023 [translates the lyrics into English] Recording

== Lyrics ==
Yiddish	Transliteration	Translation
טאַטעס מאַמעס קינדערלעך בױען באַריקאַדן	Tates, mames, kinderlekh, boyen barikadn,	Fathers, mothers, children, raising barricades,
אױף די גאַסן גײען אַרום אַרבעטער־אָטריאַדן	oyf di gasn geyen arum arbeter-otryadn.	Workers' battalions taking to the streets.
ס׳איז דער טאַטע פֿרי פֿון שטוב אַוועק אױף דער פֿאַבריק	s'iz der tate fri fun shtub avek oyf der fabrik,	Father left home early, to the factory gone,
וועט ער שױן אין שטיבעלע ניט קומען הײַנט צוריק	vet er shoyn in shtibele nit kumen haynt tsurik.	Won't be coming home to us any time too soon.
ס׳ווײסן גוט די קינדערלעך דער טאַטע וועט ניט קומען	s'veysn gut di kinderlekh, der tate vet nit kumen,	The kids know well the reason why father won't return,
ס׳איז דער טאַטע הײַנט אין גאַס מיט זײַן ביקס פֿאַרנומען	s'iz der tate haynt in gas mit zayn biks farnumen.	He's taken to the streets today and brought along his gun.
ס׳איז די מאַמע אױך אַוועק אין גאַס פֿאַרקױפֿן עפּל	s'iz di mame oykh avek in gas farkoyfn epl,	Mother too is in the street, off to sell some apples,
שטײען אין קיך פֿאַריתומטע די טעלער מיטן טעפּל	shteyen in kikh faryosemte di teler mitn tepl.	Leaving orphaned in the kitchen all the pots and dishes.
ס׳וועט ניט זײַן קײן וועטשערע" זאָגט חנהלע די יאַטן"	"s'vet nit zayn keyn vetshere", zogt khanele di yatn,	"Don't expect to eat supper", says Khanele to the boys,
"ווײַל די מאַמע איז אַוועק צוהעלפֿן דעם טאַטן"	"vayl di mame iz avek tsuhelfn dem tatn..."	"Because Mother has gone to help Father..."
