= Malyi Hovyliv =

Rural locality in Ternopil Oblast, Ukraine

Malyi Hovyliv Малий Говилів
- Location in Ternopil Oblast
- Coordinates: 49°14′42″N 25°52′18″E
- Country: Ukraine
- Oblast: Ternopil Oblast
- Raion: Chortkiv Raion
- Hromada: Khorostkiv urban hromada
- Time zone: UTC+2 (EET)
  - Summer (DST): UTC+3 (EEST)
- Postal code: 48162

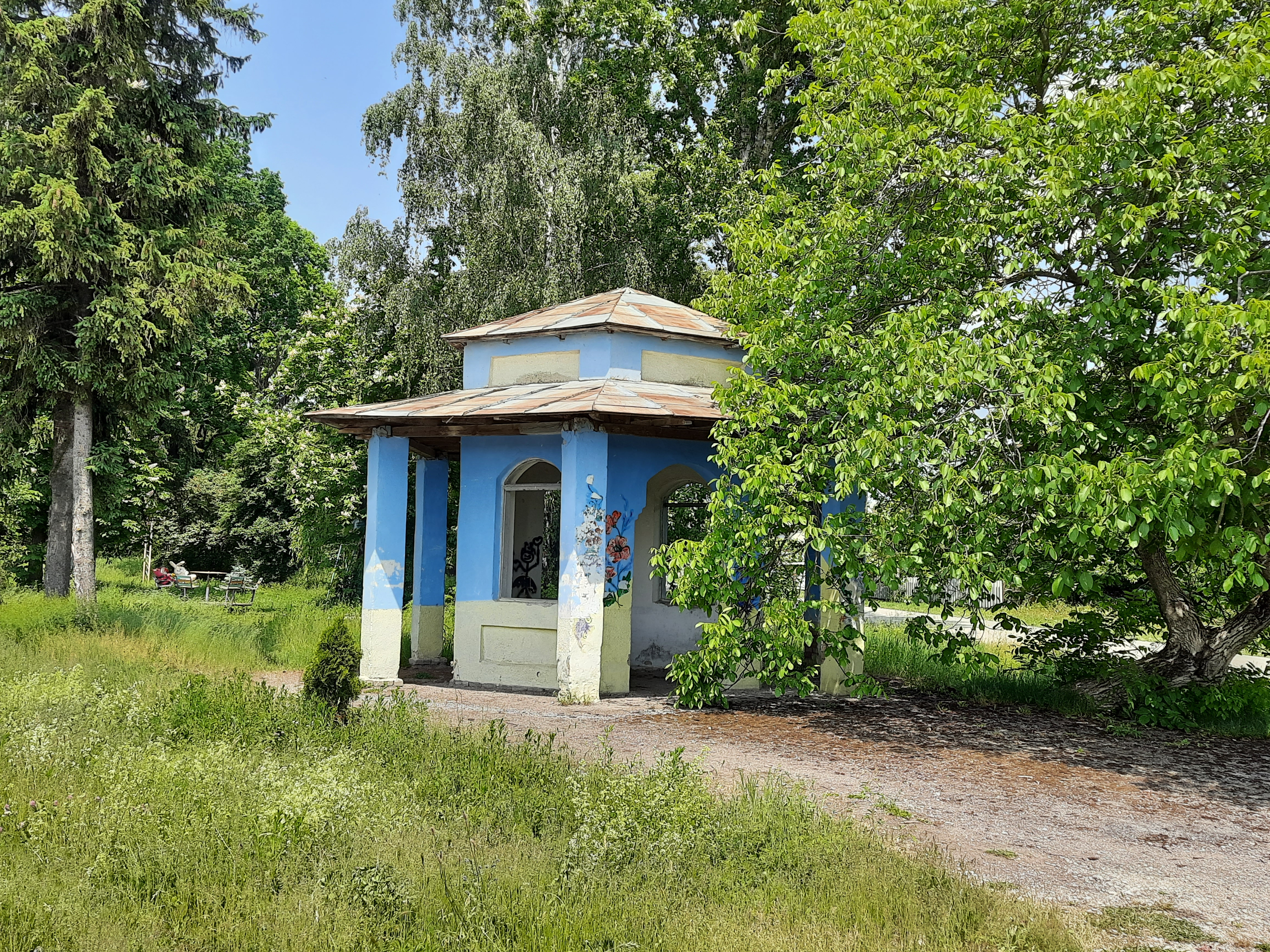
Bus stop village of Maly Hovyliv

Malyi Hovyliv (Ukrainian: Малий Говилів) is a village in Khorostkiv urban hromada, Chortkiv Raion, Ternopil Oblast, Ukraine.

== History ==
The first written mention is from 1564.

After the liquidation of the Husiatyn Raion on 19 July 2020, the village became part of the Chortkiv Raion.

== Religion ==
- Church of the Compassion of the Mother of God (1997, brick, UGCC).

== Sources ==
- (in Ukrainian) Човник Я., Шевчишин, О., Малий Говилів // Ternopil Encyclopedic Dictionary: in 4 v. / editorial board: H. Yavorskyi and other, Ternopil: "Zbruch", 2005, V. 2: К—О, S. 443. — ISBN 966-528-199-2.
- "Howiłów Mały". Geographical Dictionary of the Kingdom of Poland (in Polish). 3. Warszawa: Kasa im. Józefa Mianowskiego. 1882. p. 170.
