= Peremyliv =

Rural locality in Ternopil Oblast, Ukraine

Peremyliv Перемилів
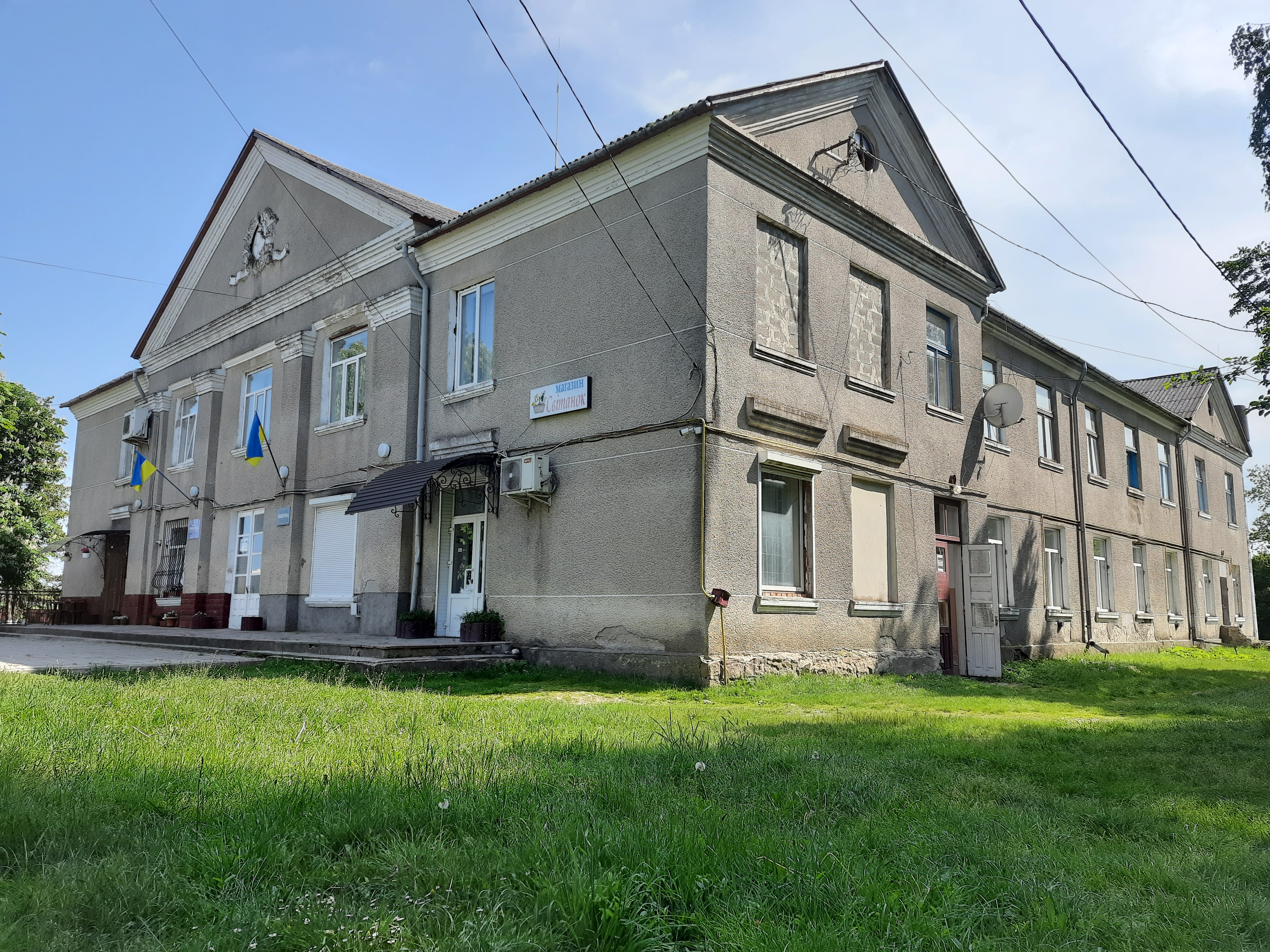
- Gymnasium school in Peremyliv Oblast

- Location in Ternopil Oblast
- Coordinates: 49°15′26″N 25°55′33″E
- Country: Ukraine
- Oblast: Ternopil Oblast
- Raion: Chortkiv Raion
- Hromada: Khorostkiv urban hromada
- Time zone: UTC+2 (EET)
  - Summer (DST): UTC+3 (EEST)
- Postal code: 48245

Peremyliv (Ukrainian: Перемилів) is a village in Khorostkiv urban hromada, Chortkiv Raion, Ternopil Oblast, Ukraine.

== History ==
The first written mention is in 1561.

After the liquidation of the Husiatyn Raion on 19 July 2020, the village became part of the Chortkiv Raion.

== Religion ==
- St. Michael's Church (1819, brick, UGCC).

== Sources ==
- (in Ukrainian) Галабіцький Б., Гуцал П., Уніят, В., Перемилів // Ternopil Encyclopedic Dictionary: in 4 v. / editorial board: H. Yavorskyi and other, Ternopil: "Zbruch", 2008, V. 3: П—Я, S. 48—49. — ISBN 978-966-528-279-2.
- "Peremyłów". Geographical Dictionary of the Kingdom of Poland (in Polish). 7. Warszawa: Kasa im. Józefa Mianowskiego. 1886. p. 958.
