= Uvysla =

Rural locality in Ternopil Oblast, Ukraine

Uvysla Увисла
- Location in Ternopil Oblast
- Coordinates: 49°10′29″N 25°57′42″E
- Country: Ukraine
- Oblast: Ternopil Oblast
- Raion: Chortkiv Raion
- Hromada: Khorostkiv urban hromada
- Time zone: UTC+2 (EET)
  - Summer (DST): UTC+3 (EEST)
- Postal code: 48206

Uvysla (Ukrainian: Увисла) is a village in Khorostkiv urban hromada, Chortkiv Raion, Ternopil Oblast, Ukraine.

== History ==
The first written mention is from 1458.

After the liquidation of the Husiatyn Raion on 19 July 2020, the village became part of the Chortkiv Raion.

== Religion ==
- Church of the Presentation of the Blessed Virgin Mary (1896, brick).

== Sources ==
- (in Ukrainian) Ковальчук В., Уніят В., Увисла // Ternopil Encyclopedic Dictionary: in 4 v. / editorial board: H. Yavorskyi and other, Ternopil: "Zbruch", 2008, V. 3: П—Я, S. 481. — ISBN 978-966-528-279-2.
- "Uwisła". Geographical Dictionary of the Kingdom of Poland (in Polish). 12. Warszawa: Kasa im. Józefa Mianowskiego. 1892. p. 865.
