= Soroka, Ternopil Oblast =

Rural locality in Ternopil Oblast, Ukraine

Soroka Сорока
- Location in Ternopil Oblast
- Coordinates: 49°13′9″N 26°0′49″E
- Country: Ukraine
- Oblast: Ternopil Oblast
- Raion: Chortkiv Raion
- Hromada: Khorostkiv urban hromada
- Time zone: UTC+2 (EET)
  - Summer (DST): UTC+3 (EEST)
- Postal code: 48238

Soroka (Ukrainian: Сорока) is a village in Khorostkiv urban hromada, Chortkiv Raion, Ternopil Oblast, Ukraine.

== History ==
The first written mention is from 1564.

After the liquidation of the Husiatyn Raion on 19 July 2020, the village became part of the Chortkiv Raion.

== Religion ==
- Church of St. Demetrius of Thessalonica (1906, built by the OCU; 1995, UGCC).

== Sources ==
- "Soroka". Geographical Dictionary of the Kingdom of Poland (in Polish). 11. Warszawa: Kasa im. Józefa Mianowskiego. 1890. p. 83.
