= Karsten Troyke =

German singer of Jewish songs

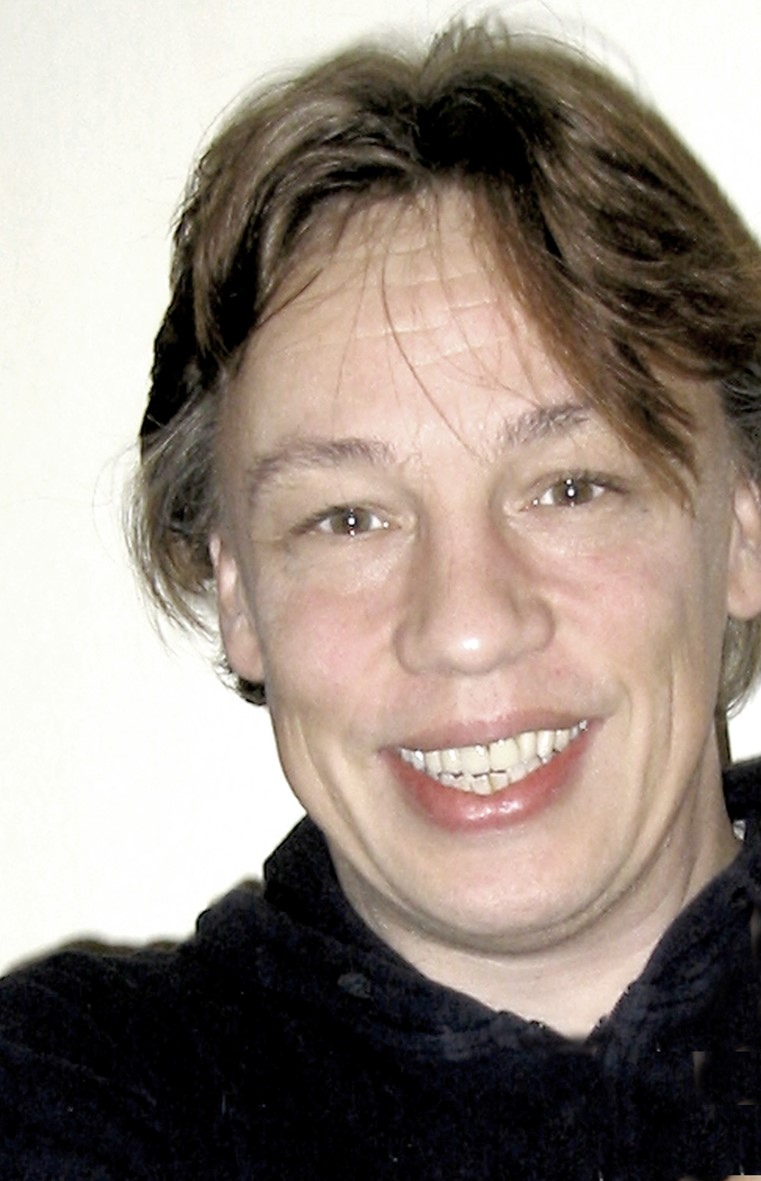
Karsten Troyke

Karsten Troyke (born Karsten Bertolt Sellhorn on 14 August 1960 in Berlin) is a German singer of Jewish songs, as well as an actor and speaker.

== Early life ==
Troyke was born to a family with some Jewish ancestry, but is not matrilineally Jewish. His father Werner "Josh" Sellhorn had a Jewish father, who hid the family tree from officials by buying a fake "Aryan passport".

Troyke worked in various jobs: as a gardener and with cognitively challenged children. He studied singing (with Leonore Gendries) as well as drama and speaking, performing on stage since 1982.

== Career ==
In 1990 he gave up work to dedicate himself full-time to musical performance and theater. Troyke participated in radio plays, worked as a voice actor (dubbing), and appeared in various stage plays.

As a singer, his album Yiddish Anders (1992) received the praise of German record critics. Jidische Vergessene Lieder (1997) contained previously unpublished songs of Sara Bialas Tenenberg, who became his mentor for the Yiddish language.

In his performances, Troyke worked with Bettina Wegner, Suzanna and the Trio Scho. His interpretations of the songs of Georg Kreisler received mention in the writer-musician's 2005 biography. In 2006, two documentaries, Yiddish Soul and Concert Yiddish Soul, featured Troyke, Shura Lipovsky, Myriam Fuks, and The KlezRoym.

Troyke holds workshops on interpreting Yiddish songs and teaches rare songs from his collection. He was a guest professor at the Jewish Music Institute of School of Oriental and African Studies (SOAS), London, at Carleton College Northfield (Minnesota) and at the summer school of Centre Medem, Paris.

== Work ==
=== Books ===
- Fritz Mordechai Kaufmann Die schoensten Lieder der Ostjuden, reprint from Berlin 1920 (2001), with translations by Karsten Troyke

=== Recordings ===
- 1991 Shuloym Alaykhem (1991)
- 1992 Yiddish Anders (Hermann Anders - Band)
- 1994 Leg den Kopf auf meine Knie, with writings of Selma Meerbaum-Eisinger, Itzik Manger und Abraham Sutzkever
- 1996 Grüne Blätter
- 1997 Jidische Vergessene Lieder
- 1999 Shuloym Alaykhem - The Old Yiddish Songs
- 1998 Troyke singt Kreisler
- 2001 Chanson Total with Suzanna
- 2005 Grüne Blätter (remastered)
- 2006 Tango Oyf Yiddish
- 2011: Unser war die Nacht (Troyke, Suzanna & Trio Scho), iTunes edition only
- 2012: Live - Klezmer Konzert (Troyke, Trio Scho), iTunes edition only
- 2012 Tango Oyf Yiddish Vol.2, Oriente Musik
- 2014 Yiddish Troubadour, Raumer Records
- 2015 Zol Zayn - Yiddish Songs, (Troyke & Daniel Weltlinger), Rectify Records
- 2015 Ich kann tanzen, (Troyke & Daniel Weltlinger), Rectify Records

In collaboration:

- 1993 Tu Balval, Suzanna
- 1994 Váci Utca, Peter M. Haas, Martin Frisch
- 1995 T&FF Rudolstadt '94
- 1997 Diadromes, Alec Kopyt & Poza (klezmer and Gypsy music)
- 1998 Dui Dui, Suzanna
- 1999 Jazz Lyrik Prosa II
- 1999 Old Russian Popsongs, Trio Scho
- 1999 Wege, Bettina Wegner
- 2000 Mit Josh um halb acht, reading of Josh Sellhorn
- 2000 Lachen und lachen lassen
- 2001 Schlaf schneller, Genosse, Ursula Karusseit, Günther Junghans, Trio Scho
- 2001 Alles, was ich wünsche, Bettina Wegner
- 2002 Schweineparadies, Die Bösen Mädchen
- 2003 Mein Bruder, Bettina Wegner
- 2004 Liebeslieder, Bettina Wegner
- 2005 Jazz Lyrik Prosa III
- 2005 Der Entenkönig, a radio play
- 2008: a Spil af Yiddish, Mark Aizikovitch
- 2008: Abschiedstournee, Bettina Wegner
- 2009: Sol Sajn: Jiddische Musik in Deutschland und ihre Einflüsse (Yiddish Music in Germany and Its Influences) (Troyke Vol.2 and Vol.4), Bear Family
- 2015 Lauter Liebeslieder, Suzanna & friends
