= Bettina Wegner =

German singer-songwriter (born 1947)

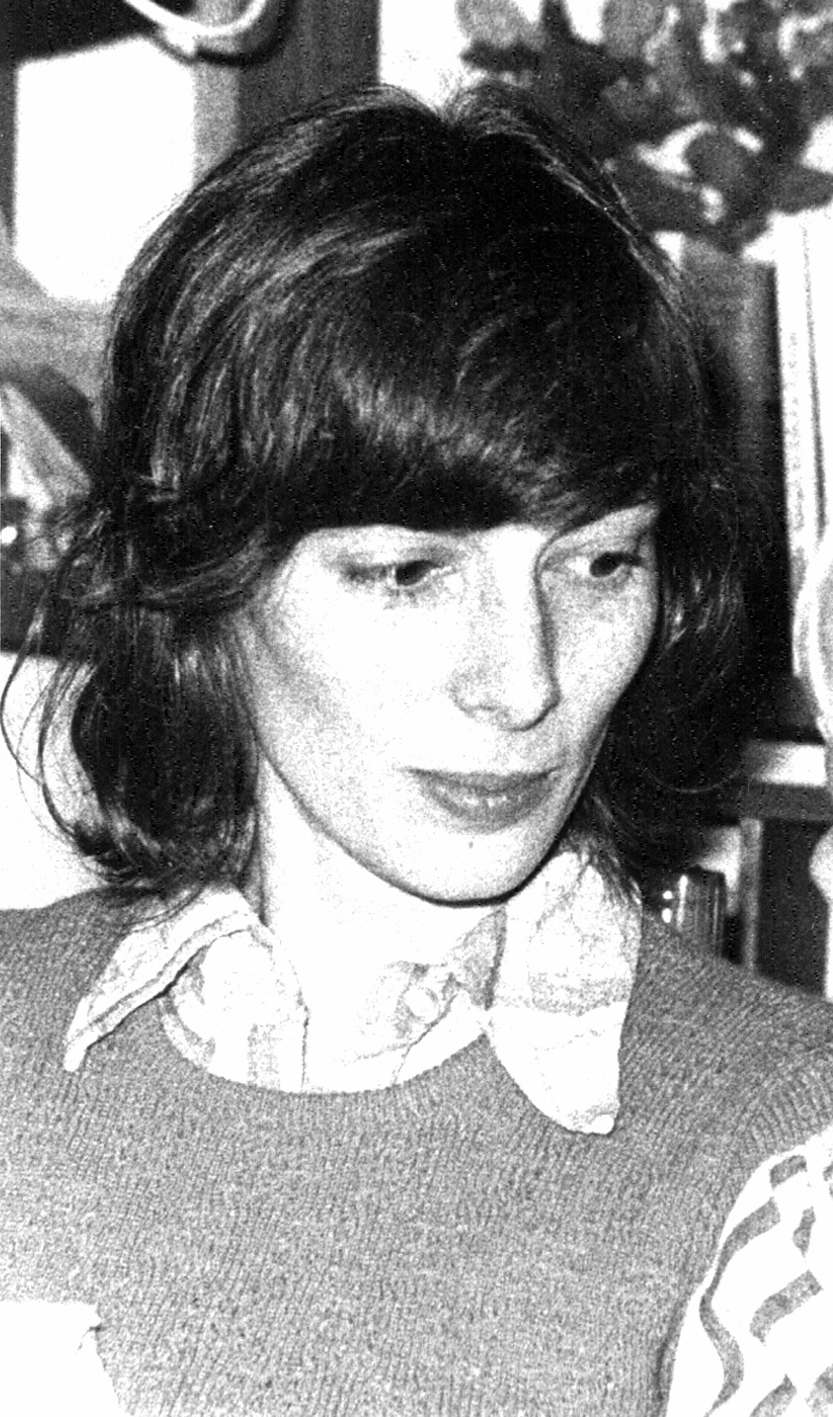
Bettina Wegner (1974)

Bettina Wegner (born 4 November 1947 in West-Berlin) is a German singer-songwriter. She is best known for her song "Sind so kleine Hände", written as "Kinder (Children)", also sung by Joan Baez, Dean Reed and others.

== Biography ==
Wegner was born in Berlin. After the creation of the East Germany (GDR), her Communist family moved to East Berlin. Her critical songs caused problems with the authorities and eventually led to her expulsion to West Germany in 1983.

She first learnt the profession of a librarian. In 1966 she began to study drama at the Ernst Busch Academy of Dramatic Arts in Berlin and was also the co-founder of the East-Berlin Hootenanny-Klub. The idea of such Clubs was that everybody could present his/her own lyrics and writings without censorship on the stage. This freedom didn't last long: within one year this principle was abandoned, the Hootenanny-Klub was named OktoberKlub and was incorporated into the official youth organization in the German Democratic Republic, East Germany.

After writing and spreading pamphlets against the intervention of the Warsaw Pact States in Czechoslovakia (Prague Spring) in 1968, she was exmatriculated and arrested because of anti-state activities. She was sent to prison for 19 months on parole. The experience of censorship and of custody (her first child from Thomas Brasch had been recently born) influenced her conduct and most of all the lyrics of her songs. After the „probation in the production" (which in the former GDR meant obligatory work in a factory), she visited nightschool, finishing the A level, and in 1972 completing her training as a singer at the 'Zentrales Studio für Unterhaltungskunst'. Since then she has lived as a singer-songwriter.

Events (like "Eintopp" and "Kramladen") together with her husband Klaus Schlesinger (journalist), to whom she was married from 1970 till 1982, were forbidden by the GDR government agencies. After she also protested publicly against the deprivation of the singer-songwriter Wolf Biermann in 1976, her own performances were cut back more and more. The Stasi spied on her and put her under pressure (permitted by the penal code § 106 of the GDR) to spy on "adversarial – negative" persons. Her former manager, Katharina Harich, who was also the manager of the comedic songgroup MTS, made some performances for her possible as insiders tip. The pre-announcements simply said, "MTS and singer". Also Werner Sellhorn helped with a program that sounded quite innocuous, like "Kurt Tucholsky and Songs of today". The concerts were jammed, the news that Bettina Wegner would sing, passed on from person to person. In the GDR, this method always worked very efficiently and smoothly with regards to forbidden music and literature. She then was also still able to give concerts in some churches, for example in the Samariterkirche in East Berlin, which was known for its oppositional events.

In 1978, she suddenly also became known in West-Germany via a television broadcast named "Kennzeichen D" of Dirk Sager. It provided the opportunity for her to publish her first long-playing record (at CBS), which was an audio recording of a concert in the artist's residence Bethanien. The first studio recording at CBS was accompanied by musicians of the rockband, Nervous Germans. All this opened up a lot of new perspectives, which would never have been possible in the GDR.

Although her own country placed an employment ban on her, they permitted her to travel to concerts in West-Germany, Austria and Belgium, because she was a foreign currency earner for the GDR. But this was merely a method of the GDR to get rid of well known but opponent artists: in 1983 the GDR instituted proceedings against Bettina Wegner because of the suspicion of "forging currency and duty misdemeanours". The GDR gave her the choice of going to jail or consenting to a deprivation. She left the GDR for West Berlin.

The loss of her homeland and the loss of her Communist ideals were becoming the most important subjects of her songs in the 80's then. As a singer she also performed with international singers such as Joan Baez, Konstantin Wecker, Angelo Branduardi. She developed impulses she got out of the performances with Wecker, together with the guitarplayer Peter Meier. From 1985 until 1992, Peter Meier was her musical companion and arranger. He also composed some of the music for lyrics of hers like 'Das Lied vom Messer', 'Waffenlos', 'Der Prinz ist gegangen' and 'Sie hat's gewußt'.

Starting in 1992, she gave regularly sold-out concerts with her new music-trio "L'art de Passage," and especially with Karsten Troyke. In 1996, as first laureate, she got the Thüringer Kleinkunstpreis in Meinigen for her program "Sie hat's gewußt" (She knew it ). She published several CDs, but no longer appeared on television or radio.

After 30 years of concert tours and music publishing, in 2007, she bade a temporary farewell to her public with a good-bye tour. The causes were not just health issues but: "It was a real haggling, as if you are an ageing hooker. Of course I have my price (...) I like to stop here, singer ain't my profession anymore ... even when I will sing now and then for benefit or special occasions for example (...)"

Bettina Wegner has three children.
