= Kliuvyntsi =

Rural locality in Ternopil Oblast, Ukraine

Kliuvyntsi Клювинці
- Location in Ternopil Oblast
- Coordinates: 49°15′29″N 25°58′56″E
- Country: Ukraine
- Oblast: Ternopil Oblast
- Raion: Chortkiv Raion
- Hromada: Khorostkiv urban hromada
- Time zone: UTC+2 (EET)
  - Summer (DST): UTC+3 (EEST)
- Postal code: 48246

Kliuvyntsi (Ukrainian: Клювинці) is a village in Khorostkiv urban hromada, Chortkiv Raion, Ternopil Oblast, Ukraine.

== History ==
The first written mention is from 1568.

After the liquidation of the Husiatyn Raion on 19 July 2020, the village became part of the Chortkiv Raion.

== Religion ==
- Church of the Intercession (1894, brick, UGCC),
- Roman Catholic Church of the Mother of God, Helper of the Faithful (1894, brick).

== Notable residents ==
- Denys Sichynsky (1865–1909), Ukrainian composer, conductor, and teacher

== Sources ==
- (in Ukrainian) Весна Х., Жмурко, І., Клювинці // Ternopil Encyclopedic Dictionary: in 4 v. / editorial board: H. Yavorskyi and other, Ternopil: "Zbruch", 2005, V. 2: К—О, S. 92. — ISBN 966-528-199-2.
- "Kluwińce, Kluwina albo Kłuwińce". Geographical Dictionary of the Kingdom of Poland (in Polish). 4. Warszawa: Kasa im. Józefa Mianowskiego. 1883. p. 171.
