= David Fishman =

American academic and author

David E. Fishman is an American academic and author. He is a professor of Jewish History at the Jewish Theological Seminary of America.

Fishman's 2017 book, The Book Smugglers: Partisans, Poets, and the Race to Save Jewish Treasures from the Nazis, won the 2017 National Jewish Book Award, in the Holocaust category. The Book Smugglers explores the desperate, clandestine effort to preserve rare Jewish books from destruction by the Nazis during the Holocaust.

== Biography ==
Fishman is the son of the linguist Joshua Fishman. His aunt was the poet Rukhl Fishman.

After graduating from Yeshiva University with an AB, Fishman earned a PhD at Harvard University.

== Bibliography ==
=== Books ===
- The Book Smugglers: Partisans, Poets, and the Race to Save Jewish Treasures from the Nazis, (ForeEdge, 2017)
- Russia's First Modern Jews, (New York University Press, 1996)
- The Rise of Modern Yiddish Culture, (University of Pittsburgh Press, 2005).

=== Edited volumes ===
- From Mesopotamia to Modernity: Ten Introductions to Jewish History and Literature, co-editor with Burton Visotzky, (Westview Press, 1999),
- Droshes un ksovim, a volume of Rabbi Joseph B. Soloveitchik's Yiddish writings, (Ktav, 2009)
- Jewish Documentary Sources in Lviv Archives: A Guide, co-editor with Alexander Ivanov. (Wroclav University Press with Dukh i Litera Publishing House, 2023).
