= Velykyi Hovyliv =

Rural locality in Ternopil Oblast, Ukraine

Velykyi Hovyliv Великий Говилів
- Location in Ternopil Oblast
- Coordinates: 49°13′40″N 25°52′8″E
- Country: Ukraine
- Oblast: Ternopil Oblast
- Raion: Chortkiv Raion
- Hromada: Khorostkiv urban hromada
- Time zone: UTC+2 (EET)
  - Summer (DST): UTC+3 (EEST)
- Postal code: 48162

Velykyi Hovyliv (Ukrainian: Великий Говилів) is a village in Khorostkiv urban hromada, Chortkiv Raion, Ternopil Oblast, Ukraine.

== History ==
The first written mention is from 1564.

After the liquidation of the Husiatyn Raion on 19 July 2020, the village became part of the Chortkiv Raion.

== Religion ==
- Church of the Assumption (1852, brick, UGCC),
- Roman Catholic church (1911).

== Sources ==
- (in Ukrainian) , Великий Говилів // Ternopil Encyclopedic Dictionary: in 4 v. / editorial board: H. Yavorskyi and other, Ternopil: "Zbruch", 2004, V. 1: А—Й, 696 s. — ISBN 966-528-197-6.
- "Howiłów i Howiłówek". Geographical Dictionary of the Kingdom of Poland (in Polish). 3. Warszawa: Kasa im. Józefa Mianowskiego. 1882. p. 170.
