= Burton Visotzky =

American rabbi and scholar of midrash (born 1951)

Burton L. Visotzky
- Occupations: rabbi, professor

Academic background
- Education: University of Illinois at Chicago, Harvard University, Jewish Theological Seminary

Burton L. Visotzky (born 1951) is an American rabbi and scholar of midrash. He is the Appleman Professor of Midrash and Interreligious Studies, Emeritus at the Jewish Theological Seminary of America (JTS).

== Education ==
Visotzky was educated at the University of Illinois at Chicago, where he received his BA, Harvard University, where he received his EdM, and the Jewish Theological Seminary of America, where he received his MA, Ph.D. and rabbinic ordination. He is a life member of Clare Hall, University of Cambridge.

== Career ==
Visotzky joined the JTS faculty, teaching midrash, following his ordination in 1977. He also served as associate and acting dean of The Graduate School of JTS, and he was the founding rabbi of JTS's egalitarian worship service in the Women's League Seminary Synagogue. Visotzky was appointed as director of the Louis Finkelstein Institute for Religious and Social Studies at the Jewish Theological Seminary of America in 2010.

He has served in visiting faculty positions at a variety of schools including Oxford University, Clare Hall – University of Cambridge, Union Theological Seminary, Princeton Theological Seminary, Hebrew Union College, Princeton University, the Russian State University for the Humanities in Moscow, the Pontifical Gregorian University in Rome and the Pontifical University of St. Thomas Aquinas.

== Interfaith dialogue ==
Visotzky has been active in interfaith dialogue, including at a groundbreaking meeting of Muslims, Christians, Jews sponsored by Saudi Arabia's King Abdullah in Madrid in 2008. He also participated in interfaith dialogue in Doha, where he was in the first group of Jews invited by the emir of Qatar.

Visotzky was appointed as director of the Louis Finkelstein Institute for Religious and Social Studies at the Jewish Theological Seminary of America in 2010. His work as director of the Finkelstein Institute has focused on Muslim-Jewish-Christian dialogue. In October 2010, Visotzky and Arnold Eisen organized a group of prominent Muslim and Jewish scholars and leaders, joined by the heads of several Christian seminaries, to meet at JTS for two days for a workshop comparing the situations of Islam and Judaism in America. In 2012 Visotzky was awarded the Goldziher Prize for his work in Jewish-Muslim relations. In 2022 he was awarded the Shevet Achim award for his work in Jewish-Christian relations.

In 2011, as a result of a naming gift, Visotzky became director of the Milstein Center for Interreligious Dialogue at JTS. He also serves as Louis Stein Director of the Finkelstein Institute for Religious and Social Studies, charged with programming on public policy. Rabbi Visotzky is a member of the Council on Foreign Relations.

Beginning in July, 2023, Visotzky served as an officer of the International Jewish Committee for Interreligious Consultations (IJCIC).

== Publications ==
Visotzky's books include:

- Reading the Book: Making the Bible a Timeless Text (1991)
- The Genesis of Ethics: How the Tormented Family of Genesis Leads Us to Moral Development (1996)
- The Road to Redemption: Lessons from Exodus on Leadership and Community (1998)
- From Mesopotamia to Modernity: Ten Introductions to Jewish History and Literature (co-editor with David Fishman, 1999)
- A Delightful Compendium of Consolation: A Fabulous Tale of Romance, Adventure and Faith in the Medieval Mediterranean (2008)
- Sage Tales: Wisdom and Wonder from the Rabbis of the Talmud (2011)
- Aphrodite and the Rabbis: How the Jews Adapted Roman Culture to Create Judaism as We Know It ( 2016)
- The Changing Face of the American Jewish Family Co-editor (2018)
- Fathers of the World: Essay in Rabbinic and Patristic Literatures (1995)
- Judaism: I: History, II. Literature, III. Culture and Modernity Co-editor, (2021)
