= Khorostkiv urban hromada =

Urban hromada in Ternopil Oblast, Ukraine

Khorostkiv urban hromada Хоростківська міська громада
- hromada
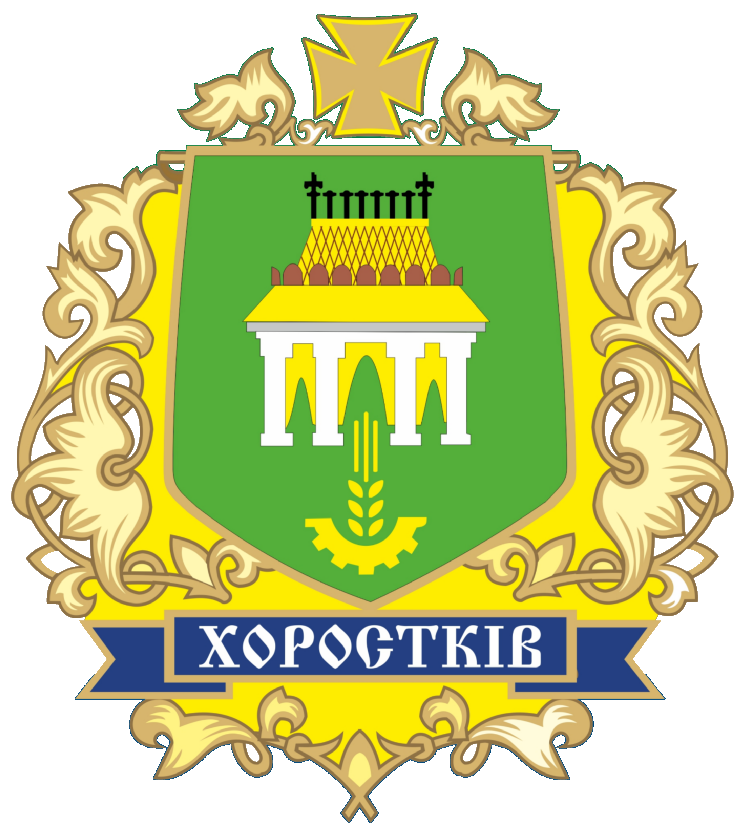
- Seal

- Location within Ternopil Oblast Location within Ukraine
- Coordinates: 49°12′34″N 25°55′3″E
- Country: Ukraine
- Oblast: Ternopil Oblast
- Raion: Chortkiv Raion
- Administrative center: Khorostkiv

Government
  - Hromada head: Stepan Hladun

Area
  - Total: 184.6 km^{2} (71.3 sq mi)

Population (2022)
  - Total: 13,537
- City: 1
- Villages: 9
- Website: khorostkivska-otg.gov.ua

Khorostkiv urban territorial hromada (Ukrainian: Хоростківська територіальна громада, romanized: Khorostkivska miska terytorialna hromada) is a hromada in Ukraine, in Chortkiv Raion of Ternopil Oblast. The administrative center is the city of Khorostkiv. Its population is 13,537 (2022 estimate)

It was formed on 11 August 2015 by amalgamation of Khorostkiv city council and Kliuvyntsi, Peremyliv, Soroka, Uvysla, Khlopivka rural councils of Husiatyn Raion and Velykyi Hovyliv rural council of Terebovlia Raion.

== Settlements ==
The hromada consists of 1 city (Khorostkiv) and 9 villages:

- Velykyi Hovyliv
- Verkhivtsi
- Karashyntsi
- Kliuvyntsi
- Malyi Hovyliv
- Peremyliv
- Soroka
- Uvysla
- Khlopivka
