= Zelig Kalmanovich =

Lithuanian Jewish historian

Zelig Hirsch Kalmanovich
- Born: 1885; Kuldīga, Russian Empire (modern-day Latvia)
- Died: 1944 (aged 58–59); Vaivara concentration camp, Generalbezirk Estland (modern-day Estonia)
- Occupations: Philologist; translator; historian
- Known for: Diary of daily life in the Vilna ghetto

Zelig Hirsch Kalmanovich (Latvian: Zēligs Hiršs Kalmanovičs; Russian: Зе́лик-Гирш Фа́йвушевич Калмано́вич) (1885–1944) was a Litvak Jewish philologist, translator, historian, and community archivist of the early 20th century. He was a renowned scholar of Yiddish. In 1929 he settled in Vilnius where he became an early director of YIVO.

He was incarcerated in the Vilna Ghetto where he became an observant Jew. During his time in the ghetto, Kalmanovich kept a secret diary which is one of the few primary sources recording day-to-day life. His diary stressed the efforts of the community to retain their humanity in the face of oppression. For example, on October 11, 1942, he wrote the following entry in his diary:

On Simhat Torah eve at the invitation of the rabbi, I went for services in a house that had formerly been a synagogue and was now a music school ... I said a few words: 'Our song and dance are a form of worship. Our rejoicing is due to Him who decrees life and death. Here in the midst of this small congregation, in the poor and ruined synagogue, we are united with the whole house of Israel, not only with those who are here today ... And you in your rejoicing, atone for the sins of a generation that is perishing. I know that the Jewish people will live ... And every day the Holy One, blessed be He, in His mercy gives us a gift which we accept with joy and give thanks to His holy name.

During the Nazi occupation, he was forced to work at the YIVO offices under Nazi supervision, sorting through the pillaged contents of Vilna's libraries and preparing selected volumes for shipment to Germany; these labourers, known as the Paper Brigade, managed to save a portion of these documents from destruction. He was sent to the Vaivara concentration camp in Estonia, where he died in 1944.

== Works ==
=== Translations ===
- Simon Dubnow. Algemeyne Idishe geshikhte: fun di eltste tsaytn biz der nayer tsayt. Vilnius: Historisher farlag, 1920. (Translation from German of Weltgeschichte des Jüdischen Volkes)
- Jaroslav Hašek. Der braver soldat Shveyk in der velt-milkhome, vols. 1–2. Riga: Bikher far alemen, 1921, 1928. (Translation from Czech to Yiddish of Osudy dobrého vojáka Švejka za světové války.)
- Max Brod. Di froy fun undzer beynkshaft: roman. Riga: Bikher far alemen, 1928. (Translation from German to Yiddish of Die Frau, nach der man sich sehnt.)

== See also ==
- List of Holocaust diarists
- List of diarists
- List of posthumous publications of Holocaust victims
