= Friling =

Friling is a surname. Notable people with the surname include:

- Albert Friling (1879–?), Belgian footballer
- Tuvia Friling (born 1953), Israeli historian and professor
