= Order of the Golden Chain =

Fraternal social organization

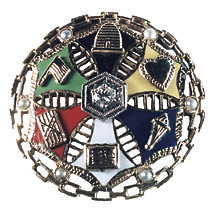
Symbol of the Order of the Golden Chain

The Order of the Golden Chain is a fraternal social organization for Freemasons and their immediate female relatives.

== Origin ==
The Order of the Golden Chain originated in June 1929 in Asbury Park, New Jersey, when a group of Master Masons and their female relatives met to fulfill a need for a non-sectarian fraternal organization that would be related to Masonry. This was made necessary as the result of the break with the Order of the Eastern Star, caused by the passage of a mandatory resolution which changed the status of the organization from what had been non-sectarian, Masonically affiliated, to a specifically Christian organization. Heretofore, it had been generally accepted throughout the State of New Jersey, that anyone who was the wife, sister, daughter, mother or widow of a Master Mason, or any Master Mason in good standing, was eligible to membership in the Order of the Eastern Star, without regard to religious ideals and beliefs. This was the practice of this organization and under which it prospered.

At the fifty-sixth annual session of the Order of the Eastern Star in New Jersey, held in Newark, in May 1927, a resolution was presented and adopted which made it inconsistent for any Jew to remain in the New Jersey Eastern Star, but upon the persuasion of the Grand Chapter, they consented to have the issue taken up at the following sessions, which were held in Trenton and Atlantic City in 1928 and 1929 respectively. At each of these sessions, this mandatory resolution was sustained, and at the session held in Atlantic City, where, despite the pleas of the various Grand Chapter officers that this mandatory resolution be made optional with the subordinate chapters, this recommendation, and the arguments, were jeered at by the majority of the non-Jewish members present, and it was openly and specifically declared that the Order of the Eastern Star was basically a Christian order, intended only for Christians, but that Jews, as members, would be tolerated.

Plans were shortly afterward formulated for the organization of a new body independent of the Order of the Eastern Star. E.M. Biron, of Atlantic City, was elected temporary head of the new organization, which was incorporated as the Grand Link, Order of the Golden Chain, State of New Jersey. In due time, the Grand Link Order of the Golden Chain was given official status in New Jersey. Constituent Links began to form up and down the eastern coast and continue to function in New Jersey, Pennsylvania and Rhode Island.

== Expansion and operation ==
It wasn't long after the Order of the Golden Chain was created that the country was thrust into the Great Depression. There was a strong need to belong to a fraternal organization such as the Golden Chain with members dedicated to helping others less fortunate than themselves. During that period, hundreds of thousands of dollars were spent by Constituent Links, from supplying food, coal and medical supplies to endowing much needed equipment for hospitals and convalescent homes for the sick, aged and orphaned.

During World War II, the Order of the Golden Chain sold more than four million dollars of War Bonds, donated ambulances, mobile kitchens, and an airplane named The Spirit of the Golden Chain. The United States government accorded the Order of the Golden Chain the honor of christening a Liberty ship, the Louis L. Bamberger, in recognition of their good deeds.

The Order incorporated its Charity Foundation and in 1945 in Blairstown, NJ, that Foundation established Camp Golden Chain for underprivileged children of all races, creeds and colors. Members of the Golden Chain believe that the encampments have left a marked influence on the children and in some way enriched their lives and enabled them to go on to a brighter future, learning the true meaning of brotherhood and sisterhood.

In the 1970s, the Charity Foundation created a scholarship for the hearing impaired. Each year, a student who meets the qualifications and standards of Gallaudet University, Washington, DC, or Rochester Institute of Technology, Rochester, NY, is selected for the four-year scholarship.

In 1978, the Charity Foundation adopted two major charitable projects: Cancer and leukemia research in children, and children with learning disabilities and minimal brain damage. Also, through the generosity of the members, along with their families and friends, four forests of more than forty trees have been planted in Israel. For its many benevolent acts, the Order was accorded the honor of having the Sunday of Brotherhood Week in February designated as "Golden Chain Day" by the non-sectarian Chapel of the Four Chaplains at Temple University, Philadelphia.

== Ritual and officers ==
The Order portrays its ideals and principles in a solemn ceremony. Six officers, known as Jewels, exalt the ideals of womanhood in tribute to their accomplishments in the home, in history, and their countless contributions to posterity.

== Unrelated orders ==
A previous Order of the Golden Chain was founded in 1881 and pronounced bankrupt in 1899. "Order of the Golden Chain" is also the name of an honor conferred in Lions Clubs International. In former ages, it was the name of an honor conferred by the kings of Munster in Ireland, and an honor conferred by the rulers of Saxony in Germany.
