= Di goldene keyt (magazine) =

Di goldene keyt ("The Golden Chain") was the leading Yiddish-language literary journal of the post-World War II era. Founded in 1949 by Avrom Sutzkever, it continued publication under his editorship until 1995. Published in Tel Aviv, Israel, it was initially sponsored by the Histadrut, one of the few Yiddish-language Israeli publications ever to have significant institutional support: the Israeli government strongly promoted the Hebrew language and was not generally friendly to the Yiddish language.
