= Jacob Fishman =

Jacob Fishman (יעקב פישמן, April 10, 1878 – December 21, 1946) was a Polish-born Jewish American Yiddish newspaper editor and Zionist.

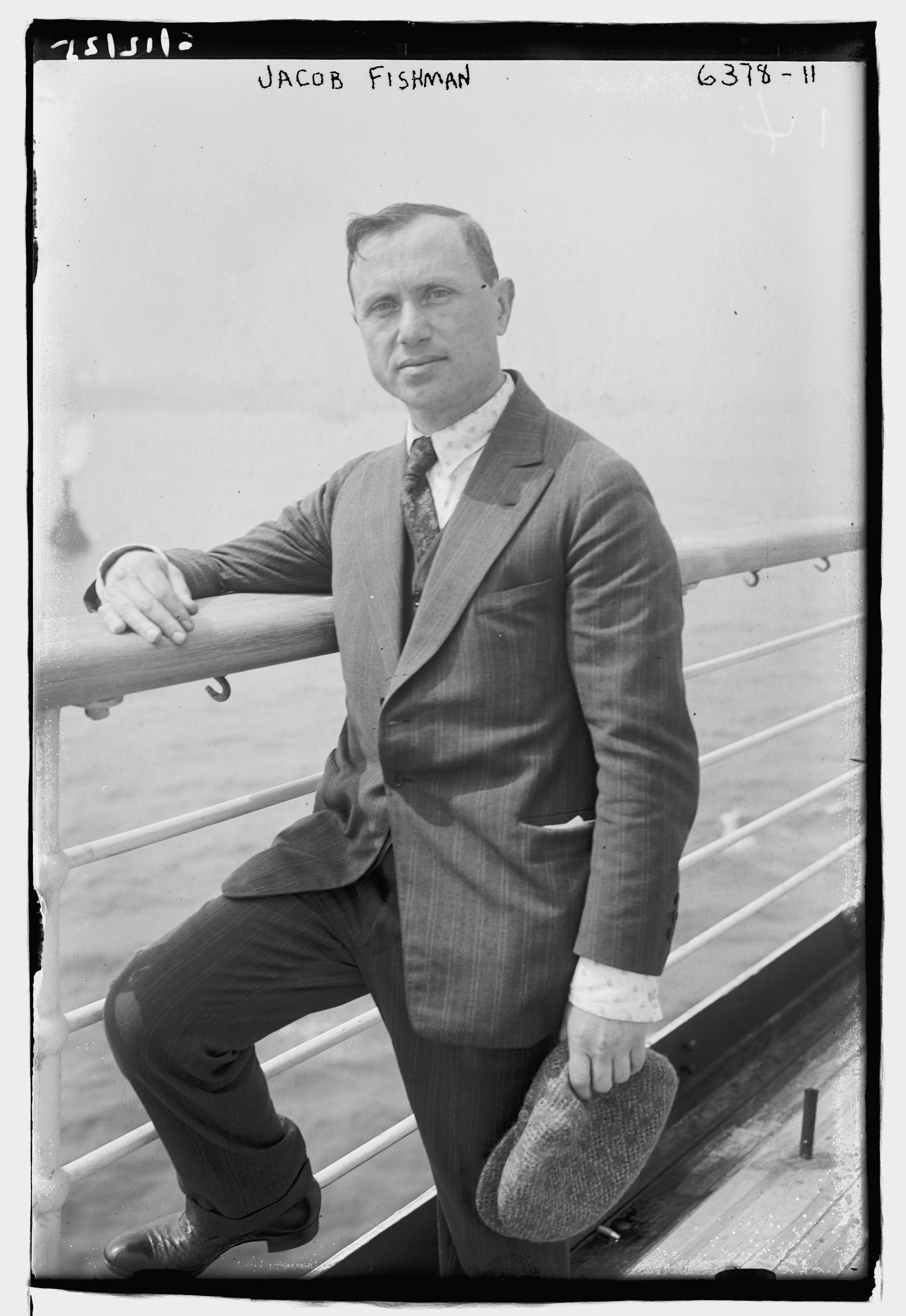
Jacob Fishman in 1925

== Life ==
Fishman was born on April 10, 1878, in Radziłów, Łomża Governorate, Congress Poland, the son of Samuel Fishman and Rachel Ebenstein. He spent two years in the Lomza Yeshiva.

Fishman immigrated to America in 1890 and attended public and private schools in New York City. He began working for The Jewish Daily News in 1893, and in 1895 he became its city editor. He then became city editor of The Warheit from 1914 to 1916. In late 1916, he became managing editor of the Jewish Morning Journal. In 1936, following the death of Peter Wiernik, he became editor-in-chief of the paper. He introduced the daily heading "Fun Tog tsu Tog” (From Day to Day), which focused on Jewish and general issues. He also contributed to the Philadelphia paper Di Idishe Velt (The Jewish World) and to the Polish Yiddish press. As editor of the Jewish Morning Journal, he was more liberal than his predecessor Wiernik and modified the paper's stance towards Zionism. Over the years, he published works from B. Gorin, Gedaliah Bublick, A. Mukdoini, and Jacob Glatstein. He serialized Theodor Herzl's diaries and the memoirs of Zvi Hirsch Masliansky, Madame Max Nordau, Ze'ev Jabotinsky, which proved so successful Abraham Cahan made sure to obtain Shmaryahu Levin's autobiography before Fishman. He retired as editor in 1938, but he continued to work for the paper as a columnist for the rest of his life.

Active in pre-Herzl Zionist organizations, Fishman helped found the Zionist Organization of America and served as a member of its central committee for many years. He was also a member of the Zionist Action Committee and a delegate to World Zionist Congresses. He attended a Jewish national rights conference in Zurich, Switzerland in 1927, and although he was a leading Zionist he left the conference in protest against those who were ignoring Yiddish, which he believed was the sole means of warding off assimilation. He was also a co-founder and vice-chairman of the I. L. Peretz Writers' Association and a founder of the world association of Jewish journalists. In 1934, he published the book Der Emes vegn di Ekonomishe Krizisn un vi Azoy Zikh tsu Bafrayen fun Zey (The Truth about the Economic Crises and How to be Freed from Them). He also helped organize the United Palestine Appeal and was credited with designing the first typewriter with Hebrew characters.

Fishman never married, and by the end of his life he was residing in the Gramercy Park Hotel.

Fishman went to Basel, Switzerland in December 1946 to attend the 22nd World Zionist Congress as a Zionist Organization of America delegate and as a correspondent for the Jewish Morning Journal. While walking to his hotel with several newspaper men, he suddenly collapsed. He died from a heart attack in a Basel hospital on December 21, 1946. The funeral service was held in Mustermesse Hall, where the Zionist Congress was meeting, and prominent members leaders of the movement attended the funeral. David Ben-Gurion, Israel Goldstein, Meyer Weisgal, Gershon Agron, and Gedaliah Bublick were among those who delivered eulogies. His body was sent to Palestine, and in January 1947 he was buried in the Mount of Olives.
