= Israel Freedman =

Jewish Romanian-American Yiddish journalist and theater critic (1878–1934)

Israel Freedman (April 11, 1878 – March 18, 1934) was a Jewish Romanian-American Yiddish journalist.

== Life ==
Freedman was born on April 11, 1878, in Botoșani, Romania. He attended the local cheder and lyceum.

Freedman began his journalistic career after his student years. From 1893 to 1899, he wrote for the major daily newspapers in Bucharest and Iași. He also began writing in a romanized Yiddish, and wrote poetry, sketches, and articles for the Arbayter in Przemyśl and the Idish Folks Blat in Lemberg. He performed in amateur Yiddish theater in Romania and Bukovina. He joined the socialist movement in his youth, and travelled on foot through the villages to spread socialism among the peasants. He was arrested and expelled from Romania for writing articles against the Romanian government, and in 1900 he immigrated to America and arrived in New York City. He initially wrote for the German socialist Folkstsaytung, although he soon began writing for Yiddish newspapers.

In America, Freedman was a regular contributor to the Yidishes Tageblat. He also wrote for other Yiddish newspapers, including The Forward, the Abendblatt, the Abendtsaytung, the Tsukunft, the Jewish Morning Journal, the Amerikaner, and the Abendpost. He wrote theatrical criticisms under the pen name Yisroel der Yanki along with feature pieces and stories mostly drawn from theatrical life. He travelled through Europe in 1911 and published interviews with, among other people, Max Nordau, Alfred Dreyfus, I. L. Peretz, Franz Oppenheimer, August Bebel, Wilhelm Liebknecht, and Jean Jaurès. Around 1918, he edited the weekly journal Teater un Muving Piktshurs. He also wrote a play which Jacob P. Adler staged in 1904.

Freedman's wife's name was Sarah. His daughter Sophie was an artist. His son David Freedman was a writer who wrote programs for Eddie Cantor and published the 1925 novel Mendel Marantz which was translated into a number of languages, including Yiddish. David also wrote a biography on Eddie Cantor, which Freedman printed in Yiddish for The Forward under the name "Kariere un Liebe" from December 1928 to January 1929.

Freedman died from a heart attack in Fallsburg, New York, where he travelled to rest following his strenuous efforts for a benefit show in Madison Square Garden for the Israel Orphan Asylum, on March 18, 1934. William Edlin delivered the official eulogy at his funeral, and former Justice Gustave Hartman, Abraham Cahan, Jacob Magidoff, and former alderman Louis Zeltner were among those who also spoke at the funeral. Stage luminaries like Ludwig Satz and Aaron Lebedeff and Broadway personalities also attended the funeral. He was buried in the family plot in Mount Carmel Cemetery.
