= Peter Wiernik =

American historian

Peter Wiernik (March 6, 1865 – February 12, 1936) was a Russian-born Jewish American Yiddish journalist, newspaper editor, writer and historian.

== Life ==
Wiernik was born on March 6, 1865, in Vilna, Russia, the son of Hirsch Wolf Wiernik and Sarah Rachel Milchiger. His father was a maggid, and his mother was a merchant. His younger sister was writer and translator Bertha Wiernik.

Wiernik attended religious elementary school. When he was thirteen, he began apprenticing under a woodcutter. He later moved to Riga and until 1881 he worked as a turner while learning German and reading secular books. For some time, he studied in Kovno and Smarhon with his older brother, who was a Hassid. In 1882 he moved to Białystok, where his parents had settled, and studied the Talmud. Under the influence of a visiting Leon Zolotkof, he also studied secular subjects and foreign languages. He immigrated to America in 1885, settling in Chicago and spending the next few years peddling goods and working in a lumberyard and as a laborer on the docks. When Zolotkof founded Teglekher Yudisher Kuryer (Daily Jewish Courier) in 1887, Wiernik became a silent partner and typesetter for the paper. He later became a contributor and co-editor for the paper. He also edited the Chicago papers Vokhntlekher Kuryer (Weekly Courier), Kol (Voice), and Keren Haor (Power of the Light). He wrote correspondence pieces on the 1893 World's Columbian Exposition for the New York newspaper Yidishes Tageblat (Jewish Daily Newspaper). He stopped writing in 1896 to work in a shop selling glassware. While in Chicago, he was founder and chairman of the "Society of People from Vilna", "Exponents of Hebrew Literature", and the educational group "Self-Education Club". He moved to New York City in 1898.

After arriving in New York, Wiernik became a correspondent for the Yiddishes Tageblat, which was now edited by Zolotkof. He also wrote for the Saint Petersburg Hebrew daily Hayom. In 1901, when Jacob Saphirstein founded the Jewish Morning Journal, Wiernik became its chief editorial writer. He later became its editor-in-chief, a position he held until his death. He also edited the weekly Der Amerikaner (Jewish American) at one point, which was published by the Morning Journal. He advocated both Americanism and Jewish Orthodoxy for arriving Jewish immigrants. He wrote weekly literary reviews and criticisms in the Jewish Morning Journal that discussed his understanding of Jewish literature in all languages all over the world.

Wiernik collaborated on several American and Yiddish periodicals and contributed to The Jewish Encyclopedia. In 1901, he wrote "The History of the Jews". In 1912, History of the Jews in America. The book was republished in 1931 and reprinted in 1972. His Yiddish biography was published in 1934 and appeared weekly in the Jewish Morning Journal from September to December 1951. Active in communal matters, he was a member of the executive committee the Joint Distribution Committee.

Wiernik was president of Habruta, vice-chairman of the Central Relief Committee, a director of the Rabbi Isaac Elchanan Yeshiva, a trustee of the Israel Matz Foundation, and a member of the Freemasons, the American Academy of Political Science, the American Oriental Society, and the American Geographical Society. He was also a director of Yeshiva College and a member of the American Jewish Historical Society. He was a Republican and attended the Party's conventions. He had a private library of over 10,000 volumes, mainly historical reference books. He was unmarried, but had an adopted son H. Wiernik.

Wiernik died at home in 922 Eastern Parkway in Brooklyn on February 12, 1936. Around 400 people attended his funeral. The honorary pallbearers included Der Tog editor Dr. Samuel Margoshes, Alexander Kahn of the Joint Distribution Committee, and Yeshiva University president Dr. Bernard Revel. Margoshes, Kahn, Jewish Writers Club president William Edlin, and Jewish Morning Journal city editor Jacob Magidoff delivered eulogies. He was buried in Mount Hebron Cemetery in Flushing.
