= Wiernik =

Wiernik is a Polish surname. Archaic feminine forms: Wiernikowa (by husband), Wiernikówna (by father).. Notable people with the surname include:

- Bertha Wiernik (1884–1951), Lithuanian-born American writer
- Jankiel Wiernik (1889–1972), Polish-Jewish Holocaust survivor
- Peter Wiernik (1865–1936), Russian-born Jewish American Yiddish journalist, newspaper editor, writer and historian
