= Solomon Dingol =

Jewish-American Yiddish journalist and editor

Solomon Dingol (March 15, 1887 – June 12, 1961) was a Russian-born Jewish-American Yiddish journalist and newspaper editor.

== Life ==
Dingol was born on March 15, 1887, in Rahachow, in what was then the Russian Empire and is now Belarus, the son of Samuel Dingol and Esther Frieda Pozin.

The descendent of a scholarly Hassidic family, Dingol received a traditional Jewish education and studied secular subjects in a state school He later studied political economy in the University of Bern in Switzerland. He immigrated to England in 1908 and began writing correspondence pieces for the Fraynd of Saint Petersburg and Warsaw. He also wrote for, among other papers, the Novyi Vostok in Moscow, the Vuhin in Galicia, Haynt in Warsaw, Dos Naye Land and Tsukunft in New York, and Nayer Zhurnal in Paris. While living in London, he edited Der Fonograf from 1911 to 1912, Der Idisher Zhurnal from 1913 to 1914, and Di Velt from 1915 to 1916. He immigrated to the United States in 1916 and studied in Columbia University. He was assistant editor of the New York City paper Yidishes Tageblat from 1917 to 1919, and he wrote the musical mystery drama Der Neyder (The Vow) in 1920 and the play Fremd Blut (Strange Blood) in 1922. From 1923 to 1924, he was assistant editor of The Forward and editor of the paper's Sunday edition. He began contributing to Der Tog in 1920.

In 1920, Dingol investigated and exposed Henry Ford's anti-Semitic propaganda. He created a survey of new immigration legislation in 1925, and in 1926 his editorials on the subject was used in Congress in arguments for liberal immigration laws. He helped start a movement on the Lower East Side for free vacation for poor Jewish children, which resulted in the formation of the East Side Vacation Association (which he was a director of) and the purchase of Camp Vacamas in Whiteport to serve as a free vacation grounds for poor children. He was also a director of the Hebrew High School in Herzliah and a national executive committee member of the Zionist Organization of America. By 1926, he was managing editor of Der Tog.

Dingol became editor-in-chief of Der Tog in 1947, following the death of William Edlin. In 1953, when Der Tog merged with the Jewish Morning Journal, he became editor of the newly-merged paper The Day-Morning Journal. He published current event pieces and editorials, and for many years he published an article every Sunday called “Di Vokh in Yidishn Lebn” (The Week in Jewish Life) that was one of the most widely read sections of the paper. He wrote Fertribene Neshomes, Ertseylung (Dispossessed Souls, a Story) in 1910, compiled and translated the literary collection Velt-Literatur (World Literature) in 1909, and translated works from Leonid Andreyev, Arthur Schnitzler, and Anatole France. He also translated, under the pen name Z. Rozes, works by Stanisław Przybyszewski, Andreyev, Władysław Reymont, Ivan Turgenev, and Mikhail Artsybashev. His translations were written while he was living in London. In 1927, he wrote the chapter on Jews for Henry Pratt Fairchild's Immigrant Backgrounds.

Dingol was vice-president and chairman of the executive committee chairman of the United HIAS Service, board member of YIVO, president of the Sholem Aleichem Folk Institute, board member of the Jewish Teachers' Seminary, and founder and president of the Committee for Yiddish in the High Schools. He was married to Oda (Citron)(1886-1958), with children Esther, Sonia, Eve, and Shulamith; and later to Yetta.

Dingol died in Mount Sinai Hospital on June 12, 1961. He was buried in the Workmen's Circle cemetery in New Jersey.
