= S. B. Komaiko =

Solomon Baruch Komaiko (Hebrew: זלמן ברוך קומיקו; September 15, 1879, in Anykščiai, now Lithuania – April 29, 1957, in Miami Beach, Florida) was an American author, journalist, and Zionist.

== Biography ==
Komaiko was born to Abel Komaiko and Rebecca Zelesnik. His mother was the aunt of David O. Selznick, famed Hollywood producer of such movies as King Kong and Gone with the Wind. After attending Yeshivas in Vilnius and other centers of Jewish learning, Komaiko emigrated to the United States via England in 1889.

Komaiko actually moved to the US in 1899. This is what it says on the back of his book "Here to Stay". This year makes more sense given the fact that he attended "yeshivas in Vilna and other centers of learning." He could not have attended these yeshivas by age 10! The mistaken year of 1889 also appears in print in Berl Cohen's "Yiddishe Shtet, Shtetlakh, un dorfishe Yishuvim in Lite" (1990), p. 27.

Komaiko first arrived in New York. Upon the recommendation of Professor Richard Gottheil, Komaiko became the chief American correspondent to Die Welt which appeared in Vienna as the official organ of the Zionist movement. In 1903, Komaiko settled in Chicago, contributing for a number of years to local Yiddish papers, such as the Chicago Sentinel and the Jewish Daily Courier. Komaiko also wrote for the Jewish Daily News of New York, the Jewish Morning Journal, the Jewish Record, and many other daily Yiddish- and English-language newspapers. As a result of his work as a journalist and author, Komaiko is regarded as one of the 100 most influential Chicago Jews of the 20th century.

In 1907, Komaiko was elected to Kadimah Zionist Organization. In 1910, he founded an insurance agency, while at the same time authoring his first book, Yidishe Velten: Ertzehlungen Skizen un Bilder.

During World War I, Komaiko held several high-profile positions related to the war effort. After the Treaty of Versailles, Komaiko used his notoriety to secure American diplomatic recognition for the newly formed Republic of Lithuania. He returned to Lithuania in 1923 and was received by President Aleksandras Stulginskis. In exchange for securing American recognition for Lithuania, Komaiko asked President Stulginskis to affirm his commitment to Jewish rights in the new republic. There was talk of nominating Komaiko as the first Ambassador to Lithuania. However, he eschewed the nomination in order to focus his efforts on Zionism.

In 1935, Komaiko was a representative at the 13th World Zionist Congress, which was held in Carlsbad, Czechoslovakia.

In 1940, Komaiko's first and only Hebrew-language book was published. Ha'Olam Ha'Tzavua (העולם הצבוע) was a popular collection of Jewish humor. Komaiko's style of humor has been compared to that of Shalom Aleichem (a pen name of Sholem Rabinovich), author of Tales of Tevye the Dairyman (adapted for Broadway as Fiddler on the Roof). Komaiko and Rabinovich were described as friends and compeers. In 1949, he published Here to Stay: A Collection of Jewish Short Stories . Here to Stay was a compilation of English language stories about Jewish American immigrant life and acclimating to the new world.

== Family ==
Komaiko was survived by his wife, Pauline Stein Komaiko, daughter Pearl Komaiko Belchetz and son Charles Komaiko. His other son, William Kadison Komaiko, a fighter pilot in World War II, was shot down over Europe in 1943. Komaiko is the grandfather of the author Leah Komaiko, composer William Komaiko,, painter Sarah Belchetz-Swenson, Playwrights Project Founder Deborah Salzer, and poet Ruth Belchetz. He is also the great-uncle of flamenco dancer Libby Komaiko, and great-grandfather of journalist Richard Komaiko.
