= Kalmele Weitz =

American cantor and musician

Kalman "Kalmele" Weitz (1916 – 1980) was an American cantor and musician, and known as a child prodigy. He was born in Grosswarden, now Oradea, Romania, to a family with a tradition of Jewish community service (rabbis, scribes, and cantors). He composed, played, and sang his own Jewish liturgical material for the stage. He performed and recorded extensively in both North and South America. He died in Montevideo, Uruguay, his final residence, on June 16, 1980, age 64.

Weitz' father was a cantor. Kalmele Weitz made his cantorial debut at age six in his hometown, and went on to tour hundreds of cities in Europe throughout his childhood. He also started his acting career during this period, appearing in theater and film.

Weitz was living in Posen, Germany, in 1928, when he was booked on an American tour. He arrived in New York, at age 11 or 12, and began recording with the Victor Company. He toured throughout the United States, billed as the "youthful cantor," or the "youngest cantor," with significant news coverage.

He acted for Ferdinand Straub, and in a later film called Kol Nidrei. He had his own music school, and also served as a reporter for an Orthodox New York Yiddish newspaper, Der Tog Morgn Dzhurnal ("The Jewish Morning Journal").
