= Joseph Margoshes =

American journalist

Joseph Margoshes (November 16, 1866 – April 10, 1955) was a Galician-born Jewish-American Yiddish journalist.

== Life ==
Margoshes was born on November 16, 1866, in Lemberg, Galicia (now Lviv, Ukraine), the son of Samuel Margoshes and Sarah Rebekah Flecker. His father was descended from Solomon Luria. According to legend, the Margoshes family was descended from Spanish exiles who went to Poland in the late 15th century.

Margoshes studied in a religious elementary school. He later studied with Rabbi Uri-Zev Salat, a Lemberg religious judge, and Rabbi Naftali Goldberg of Tarnów, the author of the religious text Bet Levi (The House of Levi). He initially worked in agriculture for a number of years. In 1898, during a severe economic crisis that heavily impacted agriculture, he immigrated to America. He was unable to adapt to the immigration conditions, so he returned home in 1900. In 1903, he immigrated again and settled for good in New York City. He initially worked as an agent and traveling businessman for the New York Yiddish newspapers. When Dr. Judah Magnes and Dr. Benderly unsuccessfully attempted to established a Jewish community council in New York in 1911–1912, he worked in the Jewish education office and helped prepare the council's yearbook.

Margoshes worked as a writer for the Tageblatt from 1901 to 1914, Der Tog from 1914 to 1921, and the Jewish Morning Journal from 1921 to 1954. When the Tog and the Morning Journal were merged into the Der Tog Morgn Zshurnal, he wrote for that paper as well. From 1927 to 1929, he wrote for YIVO's American division's publication Pinkes (Records). He also wrote for a number of other publications, including Di Tsukunft (The Future). Over the years, he published a large number of a series of articles on historical and folkloric topics. He wrote about old Jewish folktales, explained the origin and reason behind widespread Jewish customs and traditions, and wrote about the history of and development of topics like the ban on excommunication. He compiled the first full bibliography of New York's Yiddish press and published a number of essays on the history of Jewish journalism. During World War I, he was a founder of New York's Jewish writers' union, called the I. L. Peretz Writers’ Association. As the Association's first secretary, he initiated a writers' relief fund that helped alleviate the hardship of Jewish writers in Europe after World War I. He was one of the first to join YIVO's American division. In 1936, he published a memoir, Derinerungen fun mayn Lebn (Experiences from my Life). He owned a large private library, with over 20,000 books on Jewish subjects.

In 1882, Margoshes married Lena Rachel Stieglitz. Their children were Ida, Samuel, Israel, Nathan, Harry, and Henry. Two of the sons, Dr. Samuel Margoshes and Herman Morgenstern, were also well known in Yiddish journalism.

Margoshes died at his home in Brooklyn on April 10, 1955. He was buried in Montefiore Cemetery.
