= Ilan D. Feldman =

American Orthodox Jewish rabbi

Rabbi Ilan D. Feldman

Personal life
- Born: Ilan Daniel Feldman Atlanta, Georgia
- Spouse: Miriam Weinberg
- Children: 8
- Parent(s): Rabbi Dr. Emanuel Feldman and Estelle Feldman
- Occupation: Orthodox rabbi, author, speaker

Religious life
- Religion: Judaism

Jewish leader
- Predecessor: Rabbi Dr. Emanuel Feldman
- Synagogue: Congregation Beth Jacob of Atlanta
- Position: Senior Rabbi
- Began: 1991
- Residence: Atlanta, Georgia
- Semikhah: Ner Yisroel

Ilan Daniel Feldman is an American Orthodox Jewish rabbi, public speaker and author. Since 1991 he has been the senior rabbi and spiritual leader of Congregation Beth Jacob of Atlanta, Georgia, succeeding his father, Emanuel Feldman, who led the congregation for 39 years. Feldman brought a community kollel to the city. He is also a founding board member of the Association for Jewish Outreach Programs (AJOP).

== Early life ==
Feldman was born in Atlanta to Emanuel Feldman, who arrived in that city with his wife, Estelle, in 1952 to become rabbi of Congregation Beth Jacob. At that time the synagogue membership was 40 families. Over the next four decades, the couple helped build a Hebrew academy and Jewish day school, and established a nationally recognized kosher certification organization.

The young Ilan was more interested in politics than the rabbinate. Like his father, he studied at Yeshivas Ner Yisroel of Baltimore, Maryland and was a student of rosh yeshiva (dean) Rabbi Yaakov Weinberg. In 1976 Feldman married the rosh yeshiva's daughter, Miriam. The couple has eight children.

== Assistant rabbi ==
In 1980 Feldman decided to join his father as assistant rabbi of Congregation Beth Jacob. In addition to his synagogue duties, he assisted his father in the development of the Torah Day School of Atlanta, which opened in 1985.

=== Atlanta Scholars Kollel ===
On his own initiative, the younger Feldman founded the Atlanta Summer Kollel (later renamed the Atlanta Scholars Kollel) in 1987. Feldman secured funding for the project from Torah Umesorah, and brought in three graduates of Yeshivas Ner Yisroel as the first rabbis. Unlike the prevailing community kollel concept which viewed the kollel as an "inreach" organization serving its own, already-committed members, ASK is an outreach program that brings Jewish knowledge and commitment directly to the doorsteps of Orthodox, Conservative, and Reform Jews in Atlanta. ASK rabbis spend only 3 to 4 hours per day on their personal Torah learning and devote the rest of their day to "lunch 'n learn" classes, Hebrew reading crash courses, beginners minyans, campus outreach, and study groups for women, teens and singles. ASK has become a model for other community kollels in the United States. The kollel now has 11 full-time rabbis and 3 part-time women teachers who educate more than 1,000 men, women, students, teens and singles monthly.

Upon his father's retirement in 1991, Rabbi Ilan Feldman was elected senior rabbi by the synagogue's board of directors.

== Leadership ==
Congregation Beth Jacob now exceeds 500 families.

Feldman is the dean of the Atlanta Kashruth Commission, which his father founded in the 1960s. It certifies nearly 150 companies, manufacturing plants, bakeries, supermarkets, restaurants, hotels, and caterers nationwide.

Feldman is also the head of a rabbinical court recognized by the Chief Rabbinate of Israel as a reliable authority on Conversion to Judaism.

Feldman frequently speaks out on key issues. These include: Jewish conversion, Christian missionizing of Jews, Sabbath desecration, and Jewish burial.

Feldman has served as a spiritual advisor for the Atlanta branch of the Jewish Alcoholics, Chemically Dependent Persons and Significant Others (JACS) support network. He also answers questions in the "Adviceline" column in Mishpacha Magazine.

== Miriam Feldman ==
Feldman and his wife Miriam, have been "scholars in residence" on a cruise ship.

She is principal of the Temima High School for Girls, a Bais Yaakov-type school, for which she was named one of the "50 Most Influential Jews in America" by Jewsweek, placing 13th on the magazine's list.

For Feldman's tenth anniversary in office, the Georgia General Assembly passed House Resolution 131EX2 commending Ilan and Miriam Feldman for their contributions to their synagogue and the community at large.
