= Reuven Fahn =

Hebrew scholar and writer

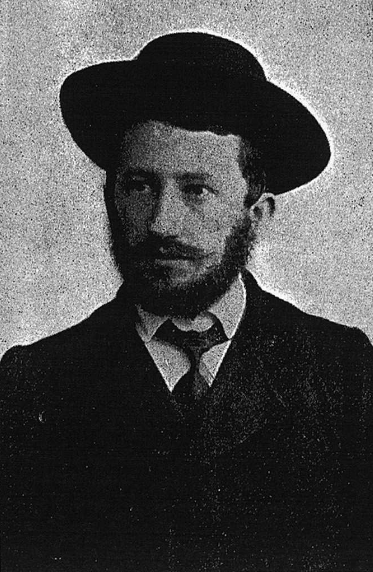
- Fahn in 1908
- Born: Reuven Fahn (ראובן פאהן); 21 February 1878
- Died: 1939 (aged 60–61) or 1944 (aged 65–66)

Reuven Fahn (Hebrew: ראובן פאהן 1878 – 1939 or 1944) was a Polish Jewish scholar, writer, historian, ethnographer and epigraphist.

== Early life ==
Reuven Fahn was born on 21 February 1878 in the village of Starunia located near the small town of Sołotwina in the southeastern part of Austrian Galicia. Fahn's father, Avraham ha-Levi, was a manager in a mine, while his mother, Zissel, was a descendant of Rabbi David ha-Levi Segal, who had served as a Rav in both Kraków and Lwow. Due to his parents' standing, Fahn received a good childhood education and was mainly influenced during this time by the Tanakh, modern and classical Hebrew literature, and various works that were translated into German from other languages. Fahn was able to speak and write Hebrew, German, Yiddish, Polish, and Ukrainian by the age of 15. In 1897, at age 19, Fahn married Rachel Keren and moved to his wife's hometown, the Polish city of Halicz. In Halicz, Fahn was influenced by the Karaite Jewish community and their unique culture, which became apparent in many of Fahn's subsequent writings and literary works.

In Halicz, either Fahn or his wife's family owned a successful little shop, which allowed Fahn to devote his spare time to scholarly pursuits. He often traveled to Lwow, the capital of Galicia, and met important Jewish intellectuals such as Yosef Haim Brenner, Moses Kleinmann, and Gershom Bader there. In addition, Fahn's little shop in Halicz, where he collected any Jewish newspapers and periodicals that he could find, became a meeting place for local intellectuals. In 1911, he joined the Mizrachi Religious Zionist organization and was one of the founders of the Galician branch of this organization. Later that same year, he was elected as a Mizrachi delegate to the Tenth World Zionist Congress in Berlin.

== Later life ==
As the Imperial Russian Army was advancing into eastern Galicia after the start of World War I in 1914, Fahn, along with many other Galician Jews, fled to Vienna, the capital of Austria-Hungary. Fahn enjoyed the libraries and scholarly life in Vienna during his time there, with him working as a librarian at the Adat Yisrael Jewish library until he was drafted for service into the Austro-Hungarian army on 1 December 1914. His military service ended on 2 November 1918, with Austria-Hungary's monarchy soon being overthrown and Austria-Hungary soon ceasing to exist. Due to his house and property in Halicz being destroyed as a result of World War I, Fahn decided to move to Stanisławów (present-day Ivano-Frankivsk), a Galician regional center that was larger than Halicz but smaller than Vienna. In Stanisławów, he was appointed secretary to the National Council of Galician Jewry during the short existence of the West Ukrainian National Republic and remained in this position until the Polish government abolished the council in either May or June 1919. Afterwards, Fahn continued his commercial, scholarly, literary, and political work, but as a Polish citizen.

During a 1924 trip to the Mandatory Palestine, Fahn founded a colony for Galician Zionist emigrants there. Fahn himself considered immigrating to Palestine the following year, but ultimately decided not to due to his fear that Palestine would soon have an economic crisis. Ultimately, the decision of Fahn and many other Galician Zionists to stay in Poland ended up being a fatal one, due to the subsequent Holocaust decimating most of Poland's Jewish population. In 1930, Fahn maintained a correspondence with Hayim Nahman Bialik.

== Writings and literary works ==
During his career, Fahn wrote 14 separate monographs and brochures and more than 200 articles and reports in Hebrew, Yiddish, and German. Fahn's writings can be divided into two roughly equal parts, one part dedicated to the Haskalah (Jewish Enlightenment) and Zionism, the other part devoted to the history, epigraphy, and ethnography of the Karaite Jews (Karaites) and their relations with Rabbinic Jews (Rabbinites) in Galicia and elsewhere. Many of the sources that Fahn used for his research, such as tombstone inscriptions, manuscripts, and architectural monuments, were subsequently lost or destroyed. Fahn's works on the Karaites were sometimes plagiarized by other Jewish authors. They were also not necessarily viewed by the Karaites favorably since Fahn often portrayed his Karaite characters in a bad, poor, and/or unflattering light in his various literary works.

== Personal life ==
Fahn and his first wife had two girls. His wife died when he was 25 years old. Fahn's eldest daughter Hana was subsequently murdered in the Holocaust, leaving two daughters of her own who survived. In 1905, Fahn remarried to a woman from the city of Bolechow, with whom he had a son and a daughter. Yafa, Fahn's daughter from his second marriage, died at age nine while Fahn and his family were living in Vienna. Yosef, the sickly son from Fahn's second marriage, eventually had a son of his own but he and his entire family were murdered during the Holocaust.

Fahn's exact year and date of death are not known; 1939, 1940, and 1944 have all been proposed as possibilities. One report states that he was arrested and killed by the Soviets for Zionist activities a short time before the start of World War II. Another, possibly more reliable report states that he was rounded up and murdered by the Nazis and their local Ukrainian collaborators in Stanisławów at the age of 66 in 1944.

== Selected bibliography ==
- פאהן, ראובן (1896). בית ישראל: שיר־לאומי [House of Israel: A national poem]. (self-pub.)
- (הלוי), ראובן פאהן (1897). בזמן הזה: שיר [At This Time: A poem]. (self-pub.)
- תקופת ההשכלה בוינה: ציור תולדתי-תרבותי של נושאיה בחיים ובספרות בלוית התהוותה ודברי ימיה [The Enlightenment Period in Vienna: A historical-cultural picture of its subjects in life and literature]. M. Heckel. 1909.
- יוסלי טגלשר: ספור־אגדה לבני הנעורים [Yosli Tegelsher: A fairy tale for teenagers]. Snunit. 1922.
- מחיי הקראים: ציורים וטפוסים [From the Life of the Karaites: Depictions and Types] (in Hebrew). Hertz. 1924.
- געשיכטע פון דער יודישער נאציאנאל-אויטאנאמיע: אינ'ם פעריאד פון דער מערב-אוקראינישער רעפובליק [History of Jewish National Autonomy: The period of the Western Ukrainian Republic] (in Yiddish). Koltar. 1933.
- מבחר כתבים [Selected Writings] (in Hebrew). Israel Writers Association, Masada Publishing. 1969.
