= Congregation Beth Jacob (Atlanta) =

Orthodox Jewish congregation in Atlanta, Georgia

Beth Jacob Atlanta
- Location in Atlanta

Religion
- Affiliation: Orthodox Judaism
- Ecclesiastical or organizational status: Synagogue
- Leadership: Rabbi Ilan D. Feldman
- Status: Active

Location
- Location: 1855 Lavista Road, Atlanta, Georgia
- Country: United States
- Interactive map of Beth Jacob Atlanta
- Coordinates: 33°49′00″N 84°19′35″W

Architecture
- Established: 1943

Website
- bethjacobatlanta.org

Congregation Beth Jacob is an Orthodox Jewish congregation and synagogue located at 1855 Lavista Road in Atlanta, Georgia, in the United States. It is Atlanta's largest Orthodox congregation.

== History ==
The synagogue first held services in the fall of 1942 for traditional Jews living on the north side of the railroad tracks (today's Old Fourth Ward). It was officially founded in 1943 by eight individuals who were concerned with what they saw as a move away from Orthodoxy by Atlanta's Ahavath Achim synagogue. The eleven petitioners for the original charter were Maurice Gavronski, Frank Taffel, M.S. Katz, A. Tenenbaum, E. Miller, Sam Kingloff, R. Shavin, H. Pfeffer, S. Miller, J. Prolotsky and H. Epstein. The first location was a converted house on Boulevard.

Yosef Saffra became the first rabbi in 1951 when the congregation had forty members. Emanuel Feldman, then a newly married young graduate of Yeshivas Ner Yisroel of Baltimore, Maryland, joined as rabbi in 1952. In 1956, the congregation moved to a former church on Boulevard and, in 1962, moved to its current location in Toco Hills. At that time the synagogue had grown to 190 families. Membership reached 500 families in 1976 and 560 families by 1994.

Feldman remained with the synagogue for 39 years until his retirement in 1991. His son, Ilan D. Feldman, took over as rabbi, and is currently the spiritual leader of Beth Jacob.

Because of the influence and activity of Beth Jacob in the Jewish life of Atlanta, a large number of Jews moved into the area along LaVista Road. Eventually, this led to the establishment of five other Jewish congregations nearby as well as an Orthodox high school for girls (Temima) and Yeshiva Ohr Yisrael, an Orthodox high school for boys. Torah Day School of Atlanta, an Orthodox elementary school, moved to the area.
