= Emanuel Feldman =

American-Israeli Orthodox Jewish rabbi and rabbi emeritus

Rabbi Dr. Emanuel Feldman
- Title: Rabbi Emeritus

Personal life
- Born: Emanuel Feldman; August 26, 1927 (age 99) Newburgh, New York
- Spouse: Estelle
- Children: Ilan; Jonathan; Amram (d 1997); Orah (Grossman); Geulah (Preil)
- Parent: Joseph H. Feldman
- Occupation: Orthodox rabbi, author, speaker

Religious life
- Religion: Judaism

Jewish leader
- Successor: Ilan D. Feldman
- Synagogue: Congregation Beth Jacob of Atlanta
- Began: 1952
- Ended: 1991
- Residence: Jerusalem, Israel
- Semikhah: Yeshivas Ner Yisroel

Emanuel Feldman (born August 26, 1927) is an Orthodox Jewish rabbi and rabbi emeritus of Congregation Beth Jacob of Atlanta, Georgia. During his nearly 40 years as a congregational rabbi, he oversaw the growth of the Orthodox community in Atlanta from a community small enough to support two small Orthodox synagogues (and one nominally Orthodox one, Shearith Israel, which eventually became Conservative), to a community large enough to support Jewish day schools, yeshivas, girls schools and a kollel. He is a past vice-president of the Rabbinical Council of America and former editor of Tradition: The Journal of Orthodox Jewish thought published by the RCA. He is the older brother of Rabbi Aharon Feldman, rosh yeshiva of Yeshivas Ner Yisroel, Baltimore, Maryland.

== Early life and education ==
Emanuel is the eldest of three sons born to Rabbi Joseph H. Feldman, a native of Warsaw and scion of a rabbinical family. Joseph Feldman served as a rabbi in Manchester, New Hampshire in the 1930s, but left that post to assume the helm of Baltimore's Franklin Street Synagogue so his sons could attend a Hebrew day school.

Emanuel entered the day school in 1938. After eighth-grade graduation, he attended public school and studied Hebrew subjects with his father and principal in the afternoons. At the age of 15 he entered Yeshiva Rabbi Chaim Berlin for a year of high school, and from age 16 to 24 he studied at Yeshivas Ner Yisroel, where he received his rabbinical ordination in 1952. That same year, he earned his Master of Arts degree from Johns Hopkins University, having earlier completed a Bachelor of Science degree at that university.

In 1971 Feldman earned his doctorate in religion from Emory University.

== Congregational rabbi ==
In 1952, Feldman assumed his first and only pulpit, that of Congregation Beth Jacob of Atlanta. That same year, he married his wife, Estelle, and brought his bride to Atlanta. At the time, the synagogue had 40 families, only two of whom were Shomer Shabbat. While other Orthodox synagogues in Atlanta were moving away from Orthodoxy, Rabbi and Rebbetzin Feldman tried to nurture Torah observance among their constituents.

Working in their favor were Feldman's eloquent speaking talents, Torah knowledge, and secular education. The fact that this young Jewish couple — he an expert tennis player and she a well-dressed, former fashion designer — still observed what people thought of as outdated mitzvot intrigued and attracted new congregants. Still, change was gradual. It was only in the 1960s that a small group of congregants bought houses near the synagogue so they could walk to it on Shabbat and Yom Tov, and began sending their children to the Hebrew Academy of Atlanta, a day school which Feldman helped establish in 1954.

Feldman's first major test of his authority occurred in 1955, when the congregation moved into a church building. Feldman had a mechitza installed for the first night of Selichos. When they saw the tall divider separating the men's and women's sections, most of the board members' wives stormed out of the shul. The next morning, the mechitza was missing. When board members dragged their feet about reinstalling it, Feldman put his young rabbinate on the line and threatened to quit if it they didn't bring it back. On the morning before Rosh Hashana, the mechitza reappeared without comment. From that point on, the congregation acceded to its rabbi on all halakhic matters.

In 1962 the congregation moved into its own building in northeast Atlanta, near Emory University. The new facility included a Hebrew school and a mikvah. As the Orthodox Jewish community became more established, Feldman helped open the Torah Day School of Atlanta in 1985; his wife was the school's first principal. In 1996 Feldman's daughter-in-law, Miriam (wife of Rabbi Ilan D. Feldman), opened the first girls-only high school in the South, the Temima High School for Girls, a Bais Yaakov-type school.

During his nearly 40 years as a congregational rabbi, Feldman spoke out on controversial issues facing the community, including the opening of the Atlanta Jewish Community Center on Shabbat, kashrut, adoption, divorce, autopsy, and circumcision. His work as a congregational rabbi was so successful that he wrote a "love letter" to his congregation, an unusual document in the American Jewish rabbinate.

In 1980 Ilan D. Feldman, joined his father as assistant rabbi of the congregation. With Feldman's retirement in 1991, his son became the senior rabbi of the synagogue.

Feldman and his wife moved to Jerusalem in 1991, having guided more than 70 other families to make aliyah as well. In 1999 he published a humorous memoir of his experiences as a pulpit rabbi entitled Tales Out of Shul: The unorthodox journal of an Orthodox rabbi (Feldheim Publishers). In 2001 he published a book of essays on rabbinic and synagogue life entitled The Shul Without a Clock: Second thoughts from a rabbi's notebook (Mesorah Publications Ltd.).

== Active retirement ==
Since his retirement, Rabbi Feldman has been an active editor, writer and spokesman for Orthodox Jewry. He serves as editor-in-chief of the landmark Ariel Chumash project, which began publishing its new English translation of Rashi, Targum Onkelos and other commentaries in 1997. From 1988 to 2001, he was the editor-in-chief of Tradition: The Journal of Orthodox Jewish thought, published by the Rabbinical Council of America.

Feldman is a regular contributor to cross-currents.com, a blog that presents the perspectives of Orthodox Jewish writers on current events, and has been a regular op-ed contributor to The Jerusalem Post since 2006. He has also written hundreds of articles for magazines such as the Saturday Review and The New Republic.

== Family ==
Feldman's son, Rabbi Ilan D. Feldman, is married to Miriam, the daughter of Rabbi Yaakov Weinberg, former rosh yeshiva of Yeshiva Ner Yisroel. They have eight children.

== Selected bibliography ==
- Biblical and post-Biblical defilement and mourning: Law as theology. Yeshiva University Press. 1977. ISBN 0-87068-287-3.
- The Conversion Crisis: Essays from the pages of Tradition. Ktav Publishing Co. 1990. ISBN 0-88125-334-0. (co-authored with Aharon Lichtenstein and Joel B. Wolowelsky)
- On Judaism: Conversations on being Jewish in today's world. Shaar Press. 1994. ISBN 0-89906-034-X.
- Feldman, Emanuel; Wolowelsky, Joel B. (1997). Jewish Law and the New Reproductive Technologies. ISBN 0-881255-86-6. (co-edited with Joel B. Wolowelsky)
- One Plus One Equals One: An old-fashioned guide for the modern Jewish husband. Feldheim Publishers. 1999. ISBN 1-58330-376-6.
- Tales Out of Shul: The unorthodox journal of an Orthodox rabbi. Mesorah Publications Ltd. 1999. ISBN 0-89906-518-X.
- The Shul Without a Clock: Second thoughts from a rabbi's notebook. Feldheim Publishers. 2001. ISBN 1-58330-499-1.
- Biblical Questions, Spiritual Journeys: Searching the Bible for timely answers to eternal questions. Shaar Press. 2004. ISBN 1-57819-421-0.
- Tales Out of Jerusalem: Seven Gates to the City. Feldheim Publishers. 2010. ISBN 978-1-59826-518-7.
