= Jeremiah Hescheles =

Poet, journalist, and klezmer violinist

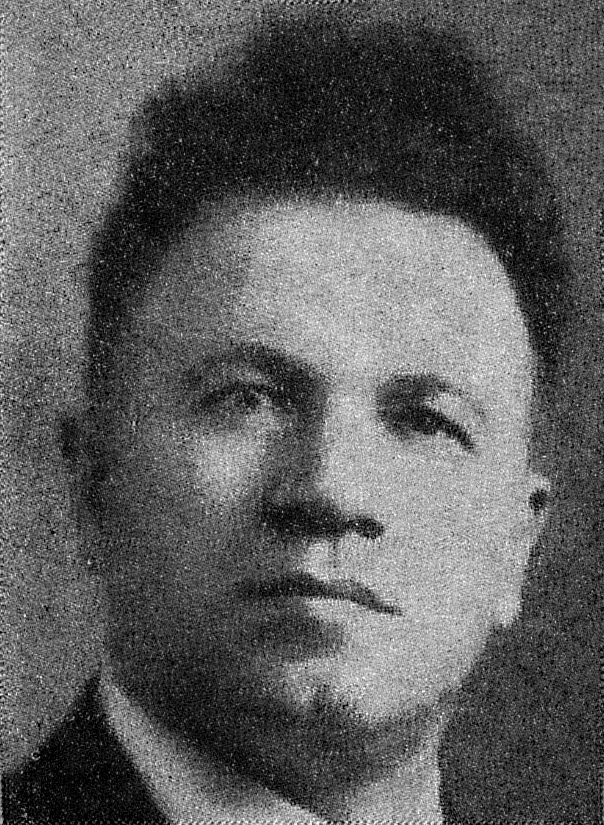
Jeremiah Hescheles

Jeremiah Hescheles (Yiddish: ירמיה העשעלעס, 1910–2010) was a Yiddish-language modernist poet, journalist, and Klezmer violinist. Because of his sharp memory and varied life experiences, he was an important resource for researchers of Yiddish culture and Klezmer music in the late twentieth century.

== Biography ==
Hescheles was born on 27 February 1910 in Glina, Galicia, Austria-Hungary (today Hlyniany, Lviv Oblast, Ukraine). (After 1918, Hlyniany became part of the Second Polish Republic.) He came from an Orthodox Jewish family. His father Moshe (Moses) owned a tobacco store and was very interested in German literature, Yiddish theater, and western music; he had even traveled to the United States before 1900, though he returned to Hlyniany before long. Jeremiah's mother was named Gal. His grandfather Rabbi Yaakov Hesheles was a well-known scholar and accountant to the local Polish nobleman. As a youth, Jeremiah showed an aptitude for music, and was sent to take lessons with local Klezmers: first Moshke Mikhl Dudlsack, a violinist and cimbalom player, and then with Hirsch Tsvi Kleinmann, a younger brother of American klezmer virtuoso Naftule Brandwein. Aside from receiving a Jewish education with local scholars in a Yeshiva, he also studied in a Baron Hirsch school and then in a Gymnasium in Lviv, from which he graduated in 1930. He also briefly enrolled in the Lemberg Conservatory, becoming the student of Morycz Wolfstahl, but returned home because of the death of his father. It was during his time in Lviv that he began to write and publish articles.

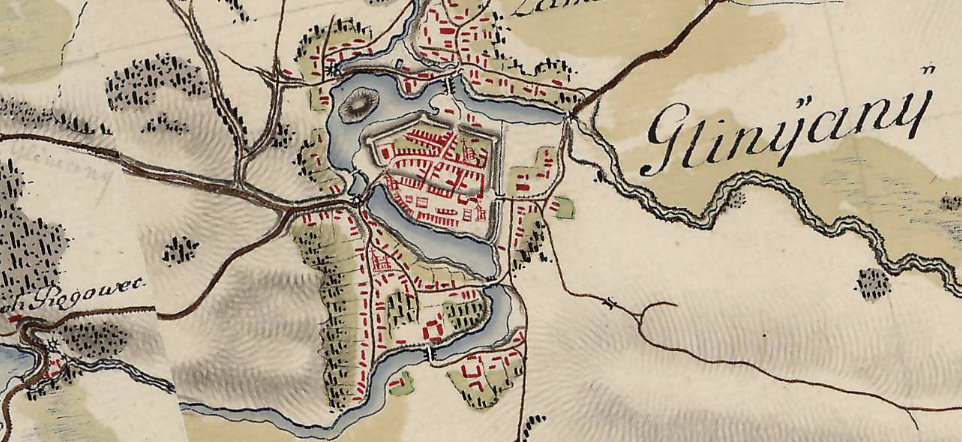
Глиняни Glinyany

Having returned to Hlyniany, he first became a violin teacher, but was then invited by his former teacher Moshke Mikhl Dudlsack to apprentice under him to become bandleader of the local klezmer ensemble. After a year of apprenticeship, Dudlsack emigrated to Argentina in 1932 with his family and left Hescheles as the new bandleader. At that time the ensemble consisted of Hescheles on violin, as well as a cimbalom and double bass player, and occasionally a flute or second violinist. He left the ensemble in 1936 to enroll in medical school, first in Prague and then in Pisa, Italy. However, when Italy passed antisemitic laws in 1938, he gave up his studies and emigrated to New York City at the invitation of his uncle, sailing from Le Havre and arriving in the United States in December. By this time he was literate in a number of languages, including not only Yiddish but also German, Hebrew, French, and Italian. He was ushered onto the American klezmer music scene by fellow Galician-born fiddler Berish Katz; Hescheles even made an appearance playing violin in the Edgar G. Ulmer Yiddish talkie The Light Ahead (1939). However, Hescheles did not like the clarinet-centric big band sound popular in the New York klezmer world, and soon left behind music for writing and journalism. He worked some short-term jobs after arriving, including writing for the Jewish Telegraphic Agency in 1939 and for the independent political candidate Wendell Willkie in 1940. He also reconnected with an old friend from Hlyniany, the Yiddish poet Abo Stolzenberg, who helped initiate him into the New York literary Yiddish milieu.

During World War II he served in the U. S. Army, enlisting in 1942, and became a U. S. Citizen while stationed in Montgomery, Alabama.

After the war he returned to New York and to the Yiddish literary scene, writing articles, poems, and reviews for a number of publications, especially for the Tog-morgn zhurnal (which was still Der Tog when he joined it). In 1950–1 he published chapters of his novel Gitale di tsiganke in its pages. He also published in a variety of other New York publications, including Tsukunft, Getseltn, Shriftn, Di feder, Nyu yorker vokhnblat, and co-edited the literary magazine Vayter in the 1950s. When he released his first book of poetry in 1957, Sonetn fun toyevoye lider, poemes (Sonnets of the Abyss), it received positive reviews for its originality, modern aesthetic, and the wide range of voices and topics it employed. His second book, Lider (Poems), was published in 1963. After the Tog-morgn zhurnal folded in 1971, he went into retirement, though he still made himself available to researchers of Yiddish culture. These include the historian of klezmer Walter Zev Feldman, who interviewed Hescheles extensively in 1998 and 1999; Rabbi Abraham Holtz, who interviewed him about Shmuel Yosef Agnon; and the Yiddishists Mordkhe Schaechter and Itsik Gottesman.

He spent his final years living in a long-term care facility in a hospital in Queens. He died there on 16 October 2010. His papers are in the collection of YIVO.

== Selected works ==
- Sonetn fun toyevoye lider, poemes (1957)
- Lider (1963)
