= Joel B. Wolowelsky =

Joel B. Wolowelsky (b. 1945) is a Modern Orthodox thinker and author. He was the dean of faculty at the Yeshivah of Flatbush high school, where he taught Ethics and mathematics. He has written extensively on topics pertaining to the role of women in Judaism and Jewish medical ethics. He served as news editor of Tradition, the Journal of Jewish Thought, and The Young One, published by the Rabbinical Council of America, the Tora u-Madda Journal published by Yeshiva University, and MeOtzer HoRav: Selected Writings of Rabbi Joseph B. Soloveitchik. He retired in June 2023 and moved to Jerusalem in July.

== Education and career ==
Wolowelsky earned his Bachelor of Science degree from Brooklyn College in 1967, and his MS at Yeshiva University in 1969 and his doctorate in philosophy at New York University Steinhardt School of Culture, Education and Human Development in 1979.

He served as chairman of advanced placement studies at Yeshivah of Flatbush.

Wolowelsky is on the advisory boards of the Lookstein Center for Jewish Education at Bar-Ilan University, the Boston Initiative for Excellence in Jewish Day Schools, and the Pardes Educators Program in Jerusalem.

He retired in 2023 after 55 years at the Yeshivah of Flatbush and made aliyah to Jerusalem.

== Awards ==
- Yeshiva University Lifetime Achievement Award in Jewish Education (2010)
- Sliffe Award for Distinguished Teaching of Mathematics on the High School Level, Mathematical Association of America (1992)
- Advanced Placement Program Outstanding Teacher Award, The College Board (2007)

== Selected bibliography ==
=== Books ===
- The Conversion Crisis: A continuing discussion. KTAV Publishing House. 2011. ISBN 978-1602801615. (ed. with Emanuel Feldman)
- The Mind of the Mourner: Individual and community in Jewish mourning. OU Press. 2010. ISBN 978-1602801493.
- The Royal Table: A Passover Haggadah. OU Press. 2010. ISBN 978-1602801394. (ed.)
- War and Peace in the Jewish Tradition. KTAV Publishing House. 2007. ISBN 978-0881259452. (ed. with Lawrence H. Schiffman)
- Mind, Body, and Judaism: The interaction of Jewish law with psychology and biology. KTAV Publishing House. 2004. ISBN 0881257923. (ed. with David Shatz)
- Women and the Study of Torah: Essays from the pages of Tradition. KTAV Publishing House. 2001. ISBN 0881256900.
- Women, Jewish Law and Modernity: New opportunities in a post-feminist age. KTAV Publishing House. 1997. ISBN 0881255742.
- Jewish Law and the New Reproductive Technologies. KTAV Publishing House. 1997. ISBN 0881255866. (ed. with Emanuel Feldman)
- Women at the Seder: A Passover Haggadah. KTAV Publishing House. 2005. ISBN 0881258695.
- The Conversion Crisis: Essays from the pages of Tradition. KTAV Publishing House. 1990. ISBN 0881253340. (ed. with Emanuel Feldman)
- Jewish Education. Human Sciences Press. 1981. ISBN 0898851246.
- Death Education in Religious High Schools. New York University School of Education, Health, Nursing, and Arts Professions. 1979.
- Yavneh Studies in Parashat Hashavua: A series of essays on the weekly sedrah. Yavneh. 1969.

=== MeOtzer HoRav series ===
- Abraham's Journey: Reflections on the life of the founding Patriarch. KTAV Publishing House. 2008. ISBN 978-1602800045. (ed. with David Shatz and Reuven Ziegler)
- Days of Deliverance: Essays on Purim and Hanukkah. KTAV Publishing House. 2007. ISBN 978-0881259445. (ed. with Eli D. Clark and Reuven Ziegler)
- Festival of Freedom: Essays on Pesah and the Haggadah. KTAV Publishing House. 2006. ISBN 0881259187. (ed. with Reuven Ziegler)
- Out of the Whirlwind: Essays on mourning, suffering and the human condition. KTAV Publishing House. 2003. ISBN 0881257729. (ed. with David Shatz and Reuven Ziegler)
- Family Redeemed: Essays on family relationships. KTAV Publishing House. 2002. ISBN 0881257958. (ed. with David Shatz)
