= Bertha Wiernik =

Lithuanian-born American writer

- Born: March 21, 1884; Vilnius
- Died: 1951; Brooklyn
- Relatives: Peter Wiernik

Bertha Wiernik (March 21, 1884 – 1951) was a Lithuanian-born American writer who wrote for Jewish publications in English and Yiddish.

Bertha Wiernik was born on March 21, 1884 in Vilnius, the daughter of Hirsch Wolf Wiernik, a maggid, and Sarah Rachel (Milchiger) Wiernik, a merchant. She was the younger sister of journalist and essayist Peter Wiernik. She emigrated to the United States in 1887 and grew up in Chicago. While living in Chicago, she attended public school and studied Hebrew and the Bible in private lessons with a rabbi. She worked at a Hebrew weekly Ha-Tehiyah as a typesetter. In 1903, she relocated to New York City.

Initially writing under the pseudonym Shulamit, she began publishing in Jewish publications in 1899. She published poems, stories, and translations of Yiddish literary classics in Der Kol, Jewish Courier, Jewish Herald, and Yidishes Ṭageblaṭṭ (Jewish Daily News). Her near future science fiction story "The Menorah Spangled Ship" appeared in the April 23 and 28, 1919 issues of Yidishes Ṭageblaṭt. In the story, Jewish refugees in London build a gigantic reconstruction of the Lusitania to bring Jews to the Land of the Chosen People. Her translation work included Slavery or Serfdom, a Jewish version of Uncle Tom's Cabin by Isaac Mayer Dick and contributing to the English-Yiddish Encyclopedic Dictionary, edited by Paul Abelson (1915).

Wiernik's anti-communist drama Destruction premiered at the Chanin Auditorium on the 50th floor of the Chanin Building on June 30, 1932. Performed by the American Classic Players, Destruction tells the story of Eleazur Amon (Claude Tosnik), the son of a minister who is recruited into communism by Dr. Porzowsky, but his father Josiah Amon rescues him from a communist meeting. Poorly reviewed, the play lasted for a single performance. Billboard called it "one of those earnest little dramas--so earnest it hurts--which are so incompetent that anybody but a theory-mad fanatic would realize their utter dramatic hopelessness at first glance." The New York Times wrote it "was modestly described as 'the play that would unite the world.' Last night it did succeed in uniting its audience in one common desire - to escape to the exits and elevators as quickly as possible." The play was reworked as Hate Planters, premiering at the Heckscher Theatre on May 23, 1933 starring Jules Dassin as Eleazur.

Wiernik also wrote the Yiddish-language dramas Lomir makhn a pshore (Let’s make a compromise), Di teyve (The [Noah’s] ark), Misis peddler (Mrs. Peddler), and Nokh nisht (Not yet).

After Wiernik's brother died in 1936, she withdrew from the public scene and became religious. She published the drama Gaysṭige aṭomen, a religyeze drame (Spiritual atoms, a religious drama) in book form in 1946.
