= Victor Swenson =

Founding Director of the Vermont Humanities Council

Victor Reuben Swenson (January 27, 1936 – July 25, 2019) was the founding executive director of the Vermont Humanities Council and the namesake for the Victor R. Swenson Humanities Educator Award. Swenson started work at the Humanities Council on New Year's Day, 1974 in Hyde Park, Vermont, with "a picnic table... and a folding chair and got to work." His early work was "...to travel the state, talk to interesting people explain this newfangled Vermont Council on the Humanities and Public Issues as we were called in those days and encourage people to send us grant applications." with their early budget of $140,000. By the time Swenson retired in 2002 after 28 years with the organization, it had eleven employees and supported 2500 events in all of Vermont's fourteen counties.

== Education ==
Swenson received a bachelor's degree from Oberlin College an M.A. and history from George Washington University and his Ph.D. from Johns Hopkins specializing in the Middle East. He taught for four years at the University of Massachusetts, at Oberlin College for a year and then taught at Johnson State College.

== Family ==
Victor Reuben Swenson was born in St. Catherine Hospital, East Chicago, Indiana to Reuben August Swenson (1905–2002; a chemist) and Ellen (Minota) Swenson (1906–1984). He was raised in Indiana. He was first married to painter Sarah Belchetz, with whom he had two daughters. They divorced and he married poet and professor Judith Yarnall; they lived in Johnson, Vermont.
