= Bernard Gorin =

American dramatist (1868–1925)

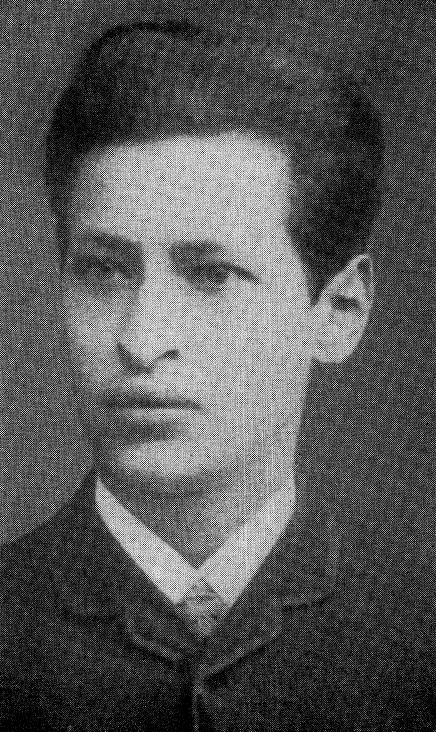
- Born: April 13, 1868; Lida, Vilna Governorate
- Died: April 13, 1925 (aged 57)

Bernard Chaimovich Gorin (Russian: Бернард Хаимович Горин; April 13, 1868 – April 13, 1925) was the pen name of Yitskhok Goyde, a Belarusian-born Jewish-American Yiddish playwright, journalist, and translator.

== Life ==
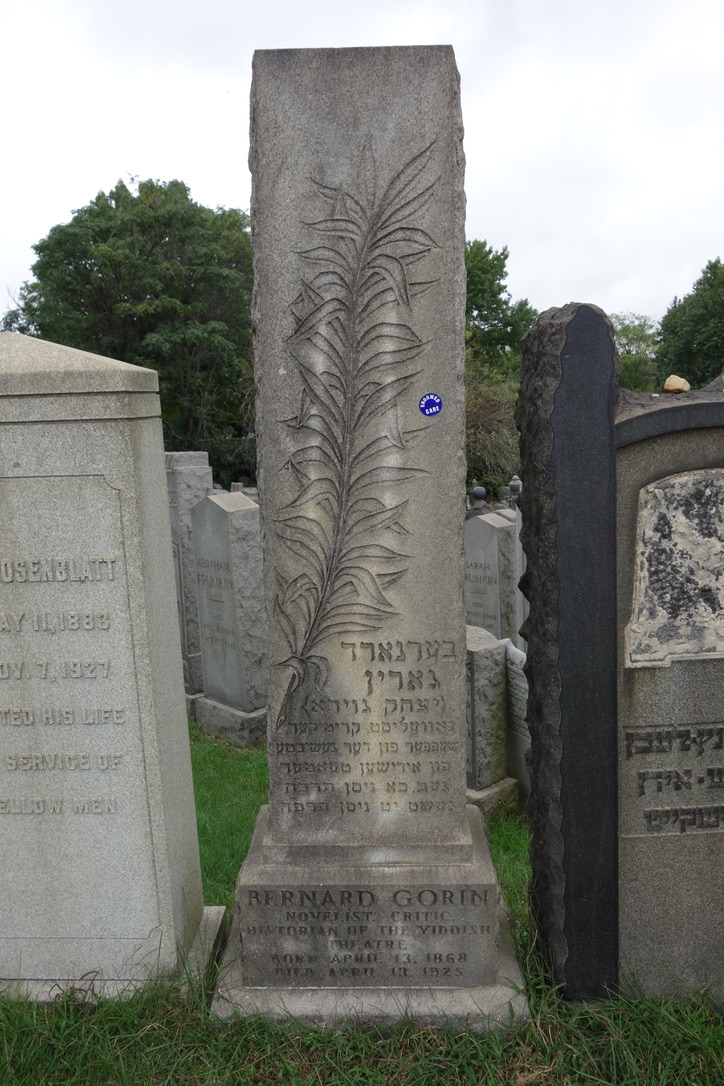
Gravestone of Gorin in Mount Carmel Cemetery.

Yitskhok Goyde was born on April 13, 1868, in Lida, Vilna Governorate, the son of an observant and well-to-do family.

Gorin received a traditional Jewish education in Lida and in the Mir Yeshiva. He moved to Vilna when he was sixteen to get a secular education. He moved to Warsaw when he was twenty-one and began his literary activities. While living in Warsaw, he contributed stories to the Yiddishe Bibliothek (which was edited by I. L. Peretz and Jacob Dinezon) and to Ben-Avigdor's Hebrew juvenile periodical Sifre Agorah. He returned to Vilna when he was twenty-five and published a series of Kleine Erzehlungen that contained several of his own creations. When he was a young man in Vilna, he attended a Yiddish teacher's institute but lost his interest in it after befriending Isaac Mayer Dick. His first story, "Zikhroynes fun Kheyder" ("Memoirs From the Ḥeder"), was published in Mordecai Spector's Hoyzfraynd in 1889.

Gorin experienced failures in Vilna, mainly through interference from censors that delayed his publication in every possible way. He left for Berlin to attend lectures in the university there. He immigrated to America shortly afterwards, and in 1895 he became editor of a Philadelphia Yiddish newspaper. He then went to New York City, where he published the "Jewish American Popular Library," a collection of short stories. Most of his sketches were published in the Arbeiterzeitung and Dos Abend Blatt. He initially wrote only short sketches in the style of the Russian writer Shchedrin, but he soon followed the example of other American writers and focused on writing reviews, popularizing science, and translating foreign authors. He began translating David Copperfield while in Russia, and in America came to translate works from Chekhov, Daudet, Maupassant, Sienkiewicz, Korolenko, Dostoyevsky, Bourget, Garshin, Potapenko, and many German and English novelists.

Gorin edited the Jüdisch-Amerikanische Volksbibliothek, the Neuer Geist in 1898, and the Theater Journal from 1901 to 1903. He also translated works from Zola, Hawthorne, Prévost, and various Russian authors. He wrote a number of stories about Yiddish New York and the Russian Jewish conditions in the city. One of his most notable stories was "Yom Kippur", which was about a Russian Jewish woman who immigrates to America and becomes influenced to forsake her religious practices until she eats on Yom Kippur.

Gorin began writing for The Forward in 1904. He joined the staff of the Jewish Morning Journal two years later and stayed with that paper for the rest of his life. He also wrote drama for the monthly Zukunft. He was associated with the Yiddish theater and wrote several plays, including Der Vilner Balebesl in 1898, Baruch Spinoza in 1902, Lebedike Keiten in 1910, A Baron oif a Tog in 1912, and In Yeden Hous in 1912 (although it was produced in 1924). He also produced and dramatized the works of other Yiddish playwrights. In 1918 and 1923, he published the two-volume Geshichte fun Yiddishen Theater, a source book for the history of Yiddish drama with 2,000 Yiddish plays by title, author, and year of publication.

Gorin died on April 13, 1925. He was buried in the Workmen's Circle section of Mount Carmel Cemetery. In 1927, his widow Elizabeth published three volumes of his collected writings with a full biography.
