= Philip Krantz =

Jacob Rombro (October 10, 1858 – November 28, 1922), better known by his pen name Philip Krantz, was a Belarusian-born Jewish-American socialist, newspaper editor, and Yiddish writer.

== Life ==
Krantz was born on October 10, 1858, in Zhuprany, in the Vilna Governorate, Russian Empire, the son of Baruch Rombro and Bella Rosa Uger. Some biographers claimed he was born in Khodaki, in the Podolian Governorate.

Krantz moved with his parents to Ashmyany, where he studied in a Russian school and had private tutors. In 1872, he began attending the Zhitomir rabbinical school. In 1873, he switched to the Kremenchug senior high school, graduating from there in 1879. During school, he became involved with the revolutionary movement. He was arrested in 1877 for political propaganda and imprisoned for a year in Kharkov. He studied at the St. Petersburg Technological Institute from 1879 to 1881. He began working as a journalist in 1880 and initially wrote for the Russian Jewish weekly Razsviet. He then studied at the Sorbonne in 1882. In 1881, following the assassination of Alexander II, he fled Russia due to his associations with the people involved in the assassination and went to Paris.

While in Paris, Krantz began his literary career by writing a lengthy essay on Baruch Spinoza in the Razsviet. He also began writing for other Russian magazines during that time, including Russki Evrey, Voskhod, and Kievskaya Zarya, became active in spreading his social democracy ideals among the Jewish working classes, and was a founder of the Jewish Arbeiter Verein, an active center of socialism for workers and students who emigrated from Czarist Russia. He moved to London in 1883 and began writing for Morris Winchevsky's Yiddish weekly socialist journal Der Poylisher Yidl. Although he never previously considered writing in the "Jewish Jargon," he spent the rest of his life writing in Yiddish. Within two years, he became editor of the new Anarchist monthly Arbeter Fraynd. In 1888, he helped found a Jewish Social-Democratic group and, at their request, translated Ferdinand Lassalle's Das Arbeiter-Programme. In 1889, the London Jewish workers chose him as their delegate to the first International Workers Congress in Paris.

In 1890, Krantz accepted an invitation from New York Jewish socialists to edit a social-democratic paper and immigrated to America. The paper, Arbeter Tsaytung, began publishing later that year. In 1894, it became the daily Dos Abend Blatt, the official Jewish organ of the Socialist Labor Party. He was also the first editor of the Zukunft, which was started by American Jewish socialists in 1892, and contributed to the monthlies Neuer Geist and Neue Zeit. In 1893, he took post-graduate courses in chemistry at New York University and worked there as an assistant lecturer in chemistry. From 1894 to 1902, he taught English in New York public evening schools.

When there was a split among Jewish members of the Socialist Labor Party over the Party's demand to control Dos Abend Blatt, Krantz remained loyal to Daniel De Leon and stayed editor of the paper. He left the paper during a subsequent split among the "loyalists" in 1899. In 1900, he was briefly editor of the Folks Tsaytung (People's Newspaper), which was established by those who split from De Leon. He edited the last issues of Di Naye Tsayt (The New Times) in 1898 and 1899, and in 1900 contributed to the weekly Der Sotsyal-Demokrat (The Social Democrat). In 1900, he was a delegate of the Social Democratic Party to the International Socialist Congress in Paris. He again worked as editor of Zukunft from 1904 to 1905, and in 1904 edited the 22 issues of Arbayter Velt (Workers’ World). He contributed to the dailies Idishe Abend-Post (Jewish Evening Mail) and Di Idishe Velt (The Jewish World), and when the latter paper merged with the Jewish Morning Journal in 1904 he contributed to that paper as well. He also worked as editor of the International Library Publishing Co., which published a large number of Yiddish books.

Krantz was in Poland from 1904 to 1906 as editor of the Di Proletarishe Velt for the Polish Socialist Party in Warsaw. In 1907, government persecution led him to move to Vilna and edit a monthly there. He also worked as a correspondent for the Morning Journal back in New York during that time. He returned to New York shortly afterwards and joined the staff of The Forward, working for that paper for the rest of his life.

Krantz wrote prolifically in Yiddish on science, social science, and cultural history, with the goal of educating Jewish immigrants who had not yet learned English. His books included a survey of astronomy, a history of the French Revolution, a history of socialism, a description of pre-Columbian America, an analysis of the Exodus from Egypt, a method for studying English, and a series of biographies on Aristotle, Bar Kokhba, Josephus Flavius, Muhammad, Don Isaac Abarbanel, Baruch Spinoza, Sabbatai Zevi, Lessing and Mendelssohn, the Rothschilds, and Meyerbeer. Some of his books went into several editions.

Krantz was married to Eva Gordon.

Krantz died at his home in the Bronx from heart disease on November 28, 1922. He was buried in the Workmen's Circle section of Mount Carmel Cemetery.
