= New Montefiore Cemetery =

Jewish cemetery in Suffolk County, West Babylon, New York

- Interactive map of New Montefiore Cemetery

Details
- Established: 1928
- Location: 1180 Wellwood Avenue; West Babylon, New York, 11704
- Country: United States
- Coordinates: 40°43′35″N 73°23′14″W
- Type: Jewish
- Owned by: Montefiore Cemetery Corporation
- Size: 250 acres
- No. of graves: more than 150,000
- Website: New Montefiore Cemetery
- Find a Grave: New Montefiore Cemetery
- The Political Graveyard: New Montefiore Cemetery

New Montefiore Cemetery is a Jewish cemetery located in West Babylon, New York.

== History ==
Montefiore Cemetery Corporation had been maintaining Montefiore Cemetery in Springfield Gardens, Queens since 1908. The corporation bought 250 acres from Pinelawn Cemetery for $375,000 and established New Montefiore Cemetery in 1928. Burials started shortly afterwards.

New Montefiore is one of a group of adjacent large cemeteries on Long Island sometimes called "cemetery row." From north to south along Wellwood Avenue, these are the Department of Veterans Affairs' Long Island National Cemetery, the non-sectarian Pinelawn Memorial Park and Gardens, the Roman Catholic Diocese of Brooklyn's Saint Charles Cemetery, and four Jewish cemeteries, which are Beth Moses Cemetery, Wellwood Cemetery, New Montefiore, and Mount Ararat Cemetery.

The Shomrim Society, the fraternal society of Jewish officers in the New York City Police Department, has a burial plot for their members in New Montefiore Cemetery.

== Notable burials ==
- Herb Abrams (1955–1996) (born Herbert Charles Abrams), founder of the Universal Wrestling Federation
- Skippy Adelman (1924–2004) (born Julius Adelman), photographer, executive in film production and advertising agencies
- Abe Beame (1906–2001) (born Abraham David Birnbaum), mayor of New York City
- Benny Bell (1906–1999) (born Benjamin Samberg), American singer and songwriter
- Ruby Goldstein (1907–1984), boxer and boxing referee
- Aaron Goodelman (1890–1978), sculptor
- Sid Gordon (1917–1975), baseball player
- Morton Gould (1913–1996), musical composer, conductor, arranger, and pianist
- Laurel Griggs (2006–2019), child actress
- Ze'ev Jabotinsky (1880–1940), Zionist leader, author, poet, orator, and soldier, reinterred in Mount Herzl Cemetery in Jerusalem in 1964.
- Alexa Kenin (1962–1985), actress
- Oscar Lewis (1914–1970), author and anthropologist
- Jacob Milch (1866–1945), writer, candy manufacturer, socialist
- Moissaye Joseph Olgin (1878–1939), writer, journalist, and Communist
- Lou Pearlman (1954–2016), record producer and Ponzi Scheme Con Artist
- Mae Questel (1908–1998), actress and vocal artist
- Tommy Ramone (real name Thomas Erdely, 1949–2014), original drummer for the punk rock band, the Ramones.
- Emily Remler (1957–1990), jazz guitarist
- Seymour R. Thaler (1919–1976), lawyer, New York State Senator, and felon
- Nahum Tschacbasov (1899–1984), Russian Empire-born painter, educator, poet

== See also ==
- List of cemeteries in New York
