= Abraham Coralnik =

Yiddish writer and journalist

- Born: October 16, 1883; Uman, Kyiv Governorate
- Died: July 16, 1937 (aged 53); Mount Kisco
- Occupations: Writer, journalist

Abraham Coralnik (October 16, 1883 – July 16, 1937) was a Ukrainian-born Jewish-American Yiddish writer, journalist, and newspaper editor.

== Life ==
Coralnik was born on October 16, 1883, in Uman, Kyiv Governorate, Russian Empire, the son of David and Gittel Coralnik. His brother Berl Coralnik was editor of the Jerusalem Bureau, Jewish Telegraphic Agency.

Coralnik initially attended the University of Kyiv, which had a severe Jewish quota at the time. He left shortly afterwards to study in universities abroad. He studied in Florence, Berlin, Bonn, and Vienna. He wrote his doctoral thesis in 1908 on the philosophy of skepticism and received a Ph.D. from Vienna that year. In 1903, he began writing in German as a correspondent for the Zionist newspaper Die Welt. He later edited German periodicals in Czernowitz, Vienna, and Zagreb. He also wrote for German philosophical journals and major German newspapers as well as several German dramas. He wrote for several Russian newspapers, and in 1911 he became a correspondent for the St. Petersburg newspaper Rech. In 1922, he published Das Russenbuch (The Russian Book), an anthology of Russian literature. From 1908 to 1913, some of his essays appeared in the Berlin paper Ha-Atid (The Future). In 1914, he briefly lived in Copenhagen. In 1915, he emigrated to New York City and became a contributor for the Yiddish newspaper Der Tog. He only rarely wrote in Yiddish until then.

In 1917, following the Russian Revolution, he returned to Russia and became a member of the Kerensky government's Food Ministry. He was a member of the Social Revolutionary Party at the time. He lost his position in the government when the Communists took over, but he remained in Russia as a newspaperman. He edited a Petrograd weekly Europe and the publication Our Way in Russia. He worked for a while for several Russian newspapers, including Birzhevie Vedomosti (Stockbroker's Gazette) and the daily Russkaia Volya (Russian Will). A number of his articles appeared in Yitzhak Gruenbaum's Petrograder Togblat (Petrograd Daily Newspaper). In 1918, he was living in Kyiv. A year later, he left the Soviet Union and returned to New York. He again worked as a contributor for Der Tog for the rest of his life. He also wrote essays for Tsukunft (Future), Tealit (Theater and Literature), and Fraye Arbeter Shtime (Free Voice of Labor).

Coralnik later became associate editor of Der Tog. He contributed to The New York Times Book Review. He was a director of ORT and the Hebrew Immigrant Aid Society. In 1934, he went to Latin America to study for Jewish colonization possibilities there for the Hicem, the Jewish joint board of the Hebrew Immigrant Aid Society and the Jewish Colonization Association. He reported Guatemala was ready to settle thousands of German-Jewish refugees. He was president of the New York Jewish section of the PEN Club. He was also a member of the Jewish National Workers Alliance.

In 1928, Coralnik collected his essays into five volumes. A further three volumes were published after his death. In May 1933, he founded the American League for the Defense of Jewish Rights in response to the rise of Nazism. He also organized the World Jewish Economic Conference in Amsterdam with Samuel Untermyer to coordinate an international anti-Nazi boycott, which met with little success. He was president of the Union of Ukrainian Jews in America and the Jewish Writers' Club. He was also a member of the administrative committee of the American Jewish Congress.

Coralnik was married to Sara Gorodetski, an organic chemist and a librarian for the American Jewish Congress. They had two daughters, Beatrice and Zoe.

== Death ==
Coralnik died in Mount Kisco Hospital from a heart ailment on July 16, 1937. Over 2,500 people attended his funeral. Samuel Margoshes presided over the ceremony and delivered the eulogy. He was buried in the Jewish National Workers Alliance plot in Montefiore Cemetery.
