= Laurel Griggs =

American child actress (2006–2019)

- Born: June 28, 2006; New York City, US
- Died: November 5, 2019 (aged 13); New York City, US
- Resting place: New Montefiore Cemetery, West Babylon, New York, U.S.
- Occupation: Actress
- Years active: 2013–2019

Laurel Griggs (June 28, 2006 – November 5, 2019) was an American child actress, primarily acting in Broadway theatre. She also appeared in films and on television, including two appearances in Saturday Night Live and a small part in the Woody Allen film Café Society.

== Career ==
Griggs' first appearance on Broadway was at the age of six as Polly in Cat on a Hot Tin Roof. She played Ivanka in the musical Once for a record-setting 17-month stint between 2013 and 2015. Her Broadway career was reported to have encompassed over a thousand performances. She also appeared on episodes of the television series Louie, Saturday Night Live, and Bubble Guppies.

== Death ==
Griggs died of an undiagnosed massive asthma attack on November 5, 2019, at Mount Sinai Hospital in Manhattan. She was 13 years old. Griggs was Jewish. She is buried at New Montefiore Cemetery.
