= Montefiore Cemetery =

Jewish cemetery in Queens, New York

Montefiore Cemetery (registered as Springfield L. I. Cemetery Society)
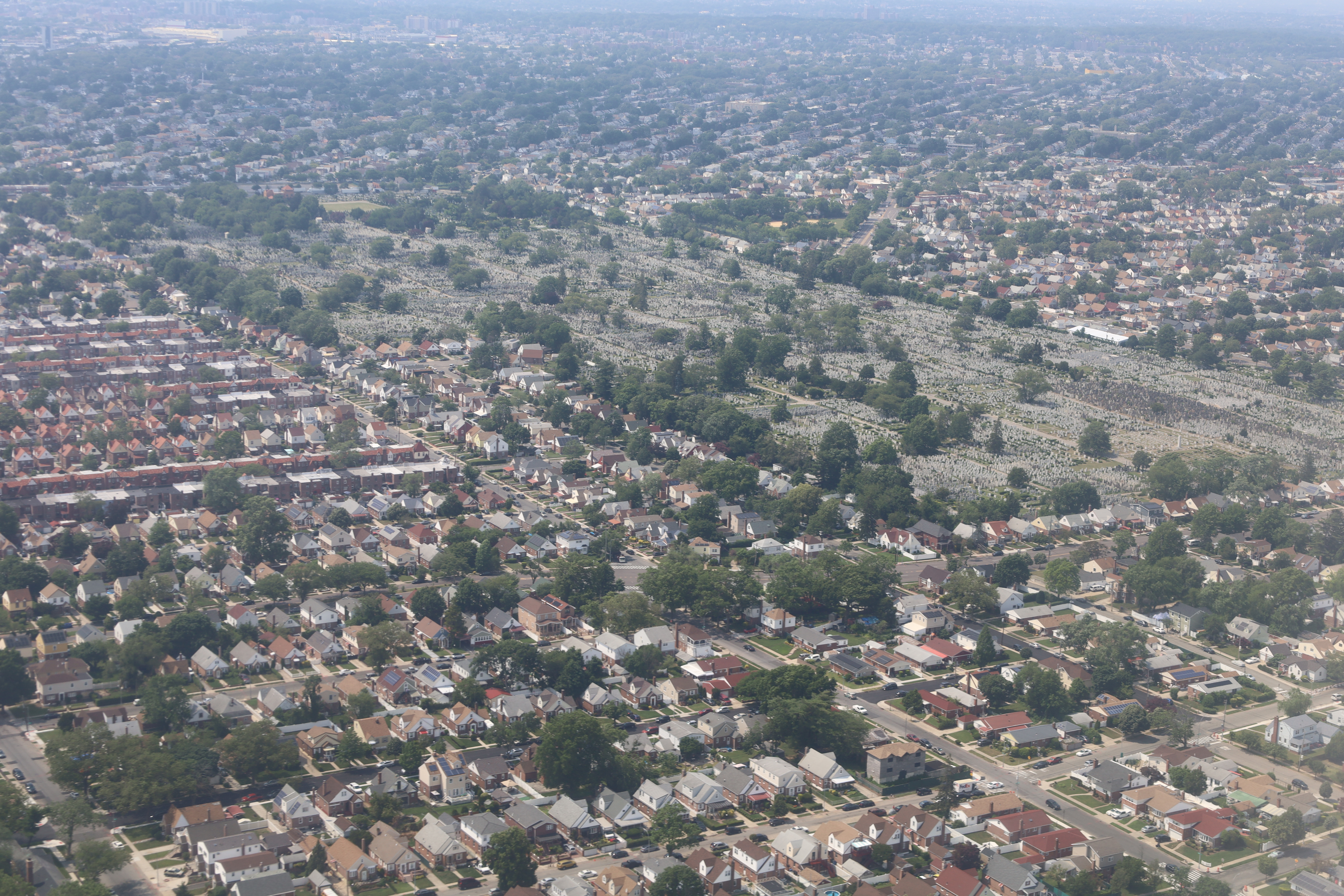
- Aerial view in 2021
- Interactive map of Montefiore Cemetery (registered as Springfield L. I. Cemetery Society)

Details
- Established: 1908
- Location: 121-83 Springfield Boulevard; Springfield Gardens, Queens, New York
- Coordinates: 40°41′09″N 73°44′30″W
- Type: Jewish
- Owned by: Springfield L.I. Cemetery Society
- No. of graves: >160,000
- Website: montefiorecemetery.org
- Find a Grave: Montefiore Cemetery
- The Political Graveyard: Montefiore Cemetery

Montefiore Cemetery, also known as Old Montefiore Cemetery, is a Jewish cemetery in Springfield Gardens, Queens, New York, established in 1908. The cemetery is called by several names, including Old Montefiore, Springfield, or less commonly, just Montefiore. More than 150,000 have been buried there.

The Shomrim Society, the fraternal society of Jewish officers in the New York City Police Department, has a burial plot for their members in Montefiore Cemetery, and it contains a large granite obelisk erected in 1949.

== Notable burials ==
- Hyman Amberg (1902–1926), mobster
- Joseph C. Amberg (c. 1893–1935), mobster
- Louis Amberg (1898–1935), mobster
- Abraham Coralnik (1883–1937), writer and newspaper editor
- Al "Bummy" Davis (1920–1945), boxer
- Herb Edelman (1933–1996), actor
- Paula Eliasoph (1895–1983), painter, poet
- Israel Lewis Feinberg, M.D. (1872–1941), coroner of New York County
- Sidney A. Fine (1903–1982), New York state assemblyman, senator, and U.S. congressman
- Fyvush Finkel (1922–2016), actor
- Alexander Granach (1893–1945), actor
- Shemaryahu Gurary (1897–1989), Chabad rabbi
- Philip M. Kleinfeld (1894–1971), New York State assemblyman, senator, and judge
- Sondra Lee (1928-2026), actress
- Israel H. Levinthal (1888–1982), rabbi
- Oscar Lewis (1914–1970), author and anthropologist
- Lou Limmer (1925–2007), baseball player
- Joseph Margoshes (1866–1955), Yiddish journalist
- Samuel Margoshes (1887–1968), Yiddish journalist and newspaper editor
- William Meyerowitz (1887–1981), artist
- Hans Morgenthau (1904–1980), international relations scholar
- Barnett Newman (1905–1970), artist
- Joseph Schlossberg (1875–1971), labor activist
- Nathan D. Shapiro (1887–1969), lawyer and New York State assemblyman
- Yosef Yitzchak Schneersohn (1880–1950), sixth Lubavitcher Rebbe
- Menachem Mendel Schneerson (1902–1994), seventh Lubavitcher Rebbe
- Arnold Schuster (1927–1952), Brooklyn clothing salesman and amateur detective
- Aryeh Leib Schochet (1845–1928), rabbi
- Sholom Secunda (1894–1974), songwriter
- Jacob Shapiro (1899–1947), mobster
- Irwin Steingut (1893–1952), politician, New York State Assemblyman from 1922 to 1952, Speaker of the Assembly in 1935
- Dave Tarras (c. 1895–1989), musician
- Abraham Telvi (1934–1956), mobster
- Peter Weinberger (1956–1956), murder victim
- Sholom Lipskar (1946–2025), rabbi and community leader

== New Montefiore ==
In 1928, Montefiore Cemetery expanded to a second site in Farmingdale, New York, named New Montefiore Cemetery.

== Sources ==
- Wilson, Scott (2016). Resting Places: The Burial Sites of More Than 14,000 Famous Persons (Third ed.). Jefferson, NC: McFarland and Co. ISBN 978-0786479924.
