= Frank Taffel =

- Taffel in 1935
- Born: March 10, 1877; Krystynopol (now Chervonohrad, Ukraine)
- Died: July 7, 1947 (aged 70); Savannah, Georgia
- Other name: Shrage Fyvel Tafel
- Occupations: journalist, synagogue founder, entrepreneur
- Known for: journalism, founding synagogue
- Spouses: Minke Frostig (1901–1945, her death); Ruth Rosenfeld (1945–1947, his death)

Frank Taffel (né Shrage Fyvel Tafel; 10 March 1877 in Krystynopol, Galicia, Austria-Hungary [now Chervonohrad, Ukraine] – 7 July 1947 in Savannah, Georgia) was a journalist, a founder of Congregation Beth Jacob (Atlanta), and an advocate of Jewish causes.

== Immigration and life in Atlanta ==
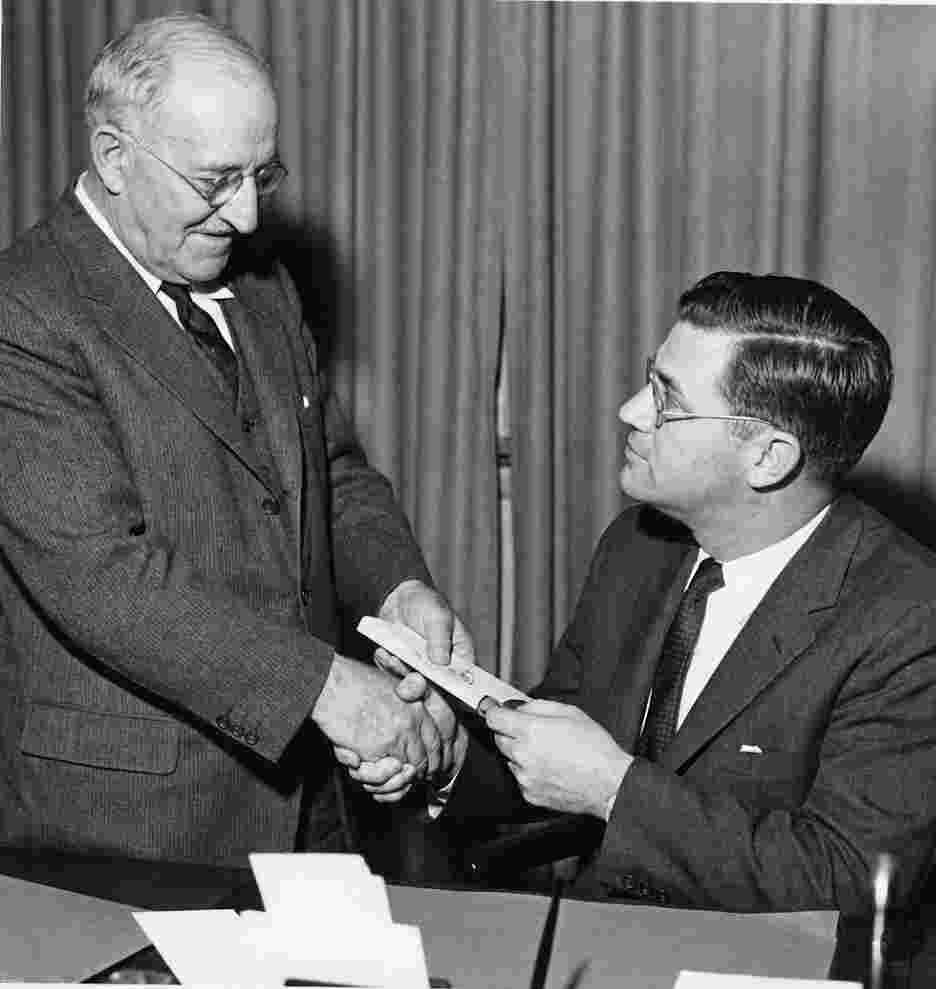
Georgia Governor Eugene Talmadge (right) extends a 1933 New Year greeting to Jewlsh cltlzens through Frank Taffel (left). In a letter to the Jewish Morning Journal, Talmadge protested persecution of Jews by the German government.

Taffel, son of Jacob Tafel, a dairy farmer, and Esther Verner, emigrated from Galicia (then Austria-Hungary, now part of Ukraine), entered the US from Montreal 1907, and became a US citizen, June 26, 1922. In 1924 he founded Atlanta's Fulton Auto Exchange, which rebuilt and sold used trucks, and he was also a commodities speculator. Taffel was a founder of Congregation Beth Jacob (Atlanta), and was one of eleven petitioners for the original charter. The Frank Taffel Sanctuary is named in his honor. Taffel frequently spoke in public on Jewish causes, and was president of the Nahum Sokolov Literary Society. He wrote for The Atlanta Journal-Constitution, The Macon Telegraph and was Atlanta correspondent for the Jewish Morning Journal of New York. In addition, he was president of the Atlanta Hebrew Sheltering and Immigrant Aid Society, and in 1937, over radio station WGST in Atlanta, described the work of the organization.

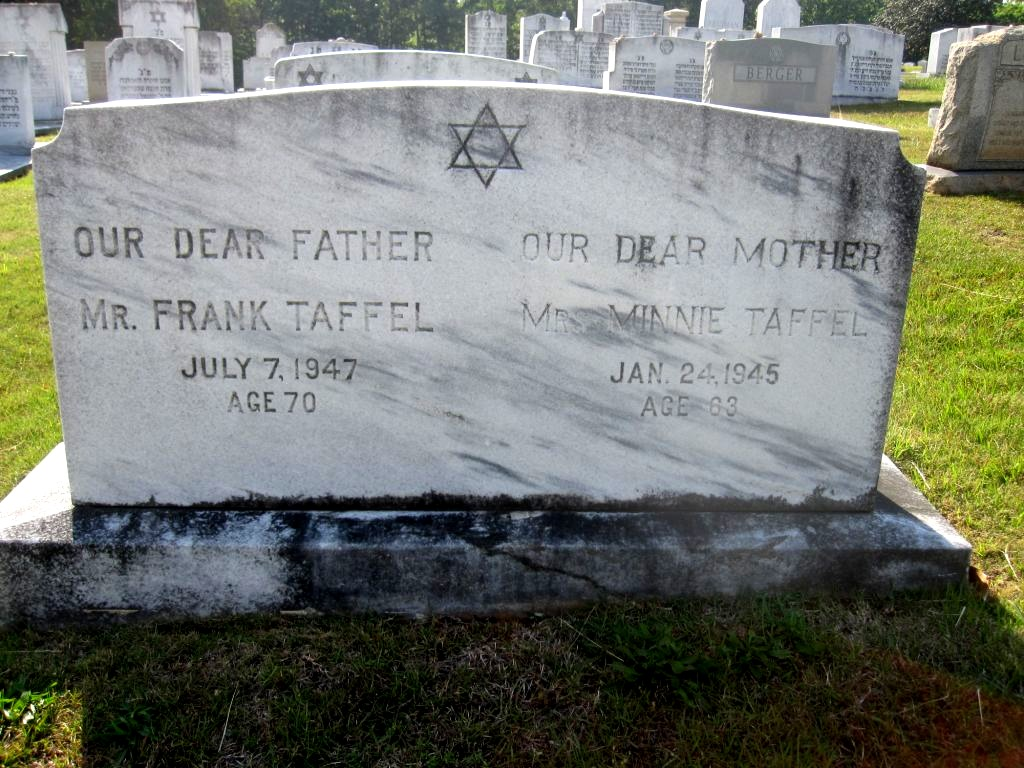
Grave of Frank and Minnie Taffel at Greenwood Cemetery, Atlanta

Taffel died on a trip to Savannah, Georgia.
