= William Edlin =

American journalist

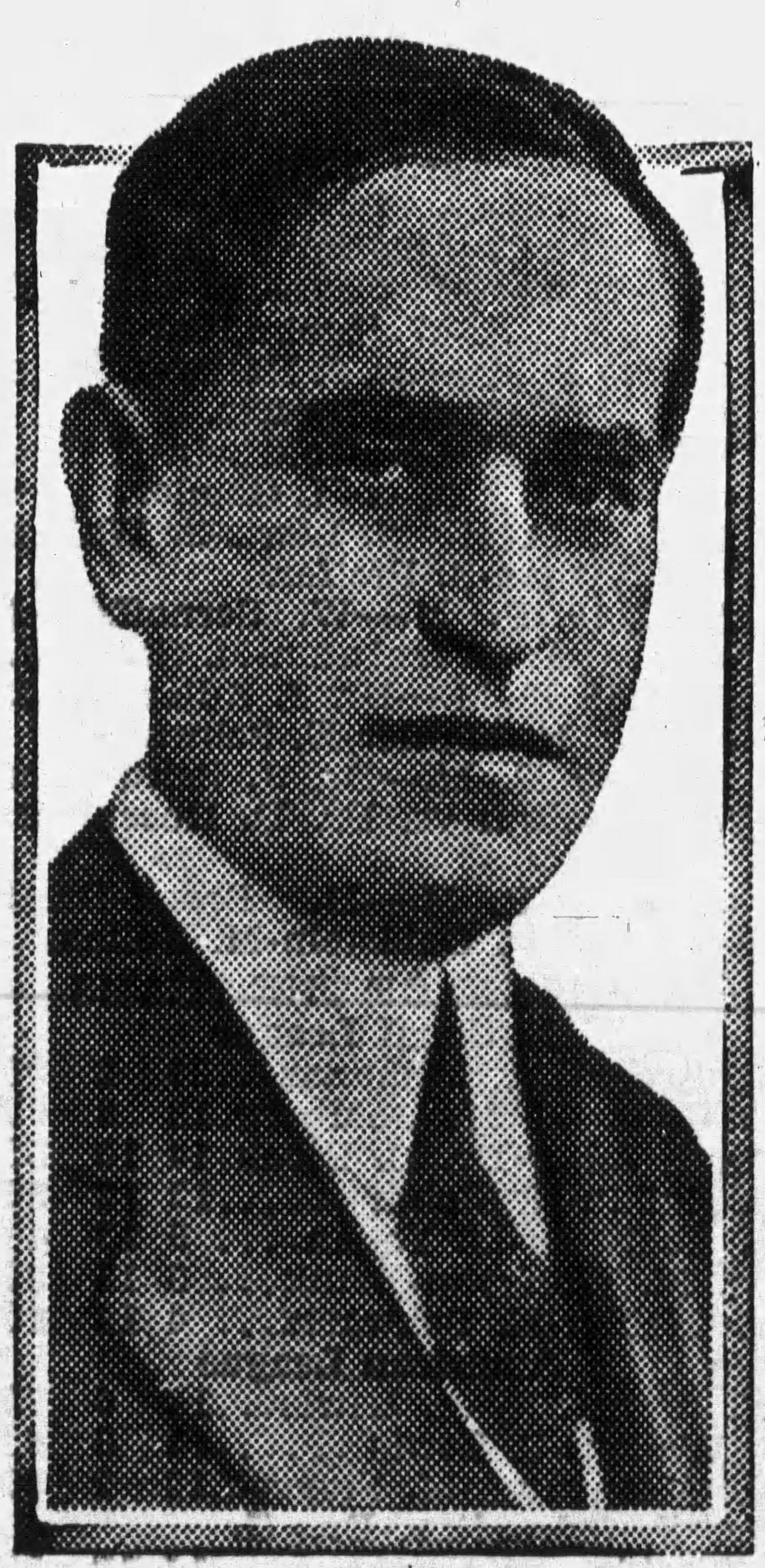
Edlin c. 1928

William Edlin (May 3, 1878 – November 30, 1947) was a Ukrainian-born Jewish-American journalist, editor, and labor activist.

== Early life ==
Edlin was born on May 3, 1878, in Priluki, Poltava Governorate, Russian Empire, the son of Paltiel Nochim Edlin and Miriam Borodinsky.

Edlin immigrated to America with his parents in 1891, settling in San Francisco, California. He attended public school there and studied at Stanford University. As a student, he was influenced by socialist ideas and became close friends with writer Jack London.

== Career ==
=== Journalism ===
He moved to New York City in 1896 and began publishing articles in Anglophone socialist publications. In 1897, he wrote an English work called The Coming Socialist Struggle: Capitalist Contradictions Exposed, Socialism Defined. He then joined Jewish socialists from the Socialist Labor Party and started writing for the daily socialist paper Dos Abend Blatt (The Evening Paper). In 1899, he became manager of the Folks-tsaytung (People's Newspaper), which was published by a group that split from the Socialist Labor Party known as the "Kangaroos." When that paper collapsed shortly afterwards, he joined fellow Kangaroos Benjamin Feigenbaum, Louis B. Boudin, Leon Kobrin, Morris Hillquit, Morris Winchevsky, and Abraham Cahan and founded the weekly Sotsyal-demokrat (Social democrat), with Edlin the first editor of the paper. It only lasted eleven months.

In 1901, Edlin worked as editor for the Hamerville Social Democrat. He then worked as an editor for The Forward from 1902 to 1903. He was also editor of the Cap-Makers Journal from 1902 to 1905 and was on the staff of the Jewish Daily Herald from 1903 to 1904. He was dramatic and musical editor of the Jewish Morning Journal from 1904 to 1913. He worked as city editor of Der Tog (The Day) from 1914 to 1916, and worked as editor-in-chief of the paper from 1916 to 1925. In 1912, he was editor of the Yiddish translation of Professor Allen Thomas' two-volume book "History of the United States" (translated to Geshikhte Fun Di Fareynigte Shtaaten). He resigned from Der Tog in 1925 and was at one point the American secretary of the Jewish National Fund. After writing independently for four years, he returned to Der Tog in 1929 as music and drama critic. In 1942, when the paper was bought by Morris Weinberg, Weinberg reappointed Edlin as editor-in-chief. He was still working in that position when he died. His last published work was an editorial published in Der Tog that called for the establishment of a Jewish state in Palestine.

When Edlin worked in The Forward, he published an article with news and stories about the Yiddish theatre every Monday under the name "In Der Velt Fun Drama Un Muzik" (In the World of Drama and Music). When he wrote for Der Tog, he often wrote reviews about the Yiddish theatre. In 1907, he published a book called "Velt-Berihmte Operes," which talked about popular European operas. In 12, Adler's People's Theatre was to release a play he wrote called Mentshn Un Keytn, A Family Drama in Four Acts," with Jacob Adler playing "Lawyers Lunt," although the play was closed before the premiere and was never staged. In 1931, Adler's Theatre staged a play he wrote with Leon Kuperman called "Der Yid." B. Gorin claimed it was adopted from Henri Bernstein's play "Israel," although Edlin denied it.

=== Political campaigns ===
Edlin unsuccessfully ran for the New York State Assembly as a Socialist in 1913 (losing to Democrat Henry S. Schimmel), 1914 (losing again to Schimmel), 1933 (losing to Democratic incumbent Patrick H. Sullivan), 1934 (losing again to Sullivan), and 1935 (losing again to Sullivan). In the 1936 United States House of Representatives election, he unsuccessfully ran in New York's 17th congressional district against Theodore A. Peyser.

== Organisation affiliations ==
Edlin was a founder of the Workmen's Circle, serving as its secretary-general from 1913 to 1914. He was highly involved in educational work and Jewish cultural activities among its members through lecture tours and publications, later becoming chairman of the educational committee. He became the centerpiece of a struggle in the organization between the "young" and the "old," and when the former was a majority of the executive committee he became chairman. He was also national executive secretary of Keren Hayesod from 1925 to 1928, president of the Yiddish Writers Union from 1935 to 1937, and president of the New York Foreign Language Film Critics. He was a member of the Zionist Organization of America.

== Personal life and death ==
In 1901, Edlin married Sarah Boudianoff. They were divorced in 1912. Later that year. he married Pauline Zeltzer. They had a daughter, Charmian, who married atomic research scientist Dr. Waldo Cohn.

Edlin died at home from a heart attack on November 30, 1947. He was buried in Mount Carmel Cemetery.
