= Miriam Karpilove =

Belarusian-American Yiddish-language writer

Miriam Karpilove (1888 – March 9, 1956) was a Yiddish-language writer and novelist.

== Biography ==
Karpilove was born in a small town near Minsk, to Elijah and Hannah Karpilov. Karpilove immigrated to America and worked for a decade as a photographic retoucher before becoming a journalist. She began writing in 1906, publishing her first piece that year in the Yiddish newspaper Di idishe fon. After achieving success in New York Yiddish newspapers, including Der tog and Forverts, Karpilove worked as a writer and editor of the women's page of a Yiddish newspaper in Boston. Karpilove would later draw on this experience in her 1926 novel A Provints-Tsaytung, whose protagonist is an undervalued journalist at a small newspaper. Karpilove was known for her serialized novels focusing on the lives of Jewish immigrant women in New York. In her works, Karpilove used the form of letters and diary entries to express her characters' feelings and thoughts. She served on the executive board of the Women's Jewish Congress Organization, a group working to ensure full political rights for Jews in foreign countries.

== Bibliography ==
Plays

- In di shturem teg: Drama. New York: 1909.

Novels

- Yudes. New York: Mayzel et Co., 1911
- Tagebukh fun an elender meydl oder der kamf gegn fraye libe. New York: S. Kantrowitz, 1918.
- Brokhe, a Kleyn-Shtetldike. New York: 1923.
- A Provints-Tsaytung. New York: 1926.
- Di yam-tsig. Serialized in Forverts, October 19, 1929 – January 4, 1930.
- Kapitlekh fun dem lebn fun meydl. Serialized in Forverts, April 12, 1930 – June 25, 1930.
- Di retenish. Serialized in Forverts, October 14, 1930 — Sunday, April 5, 1931.
- Ire gelibte. Serialized in Forverts, October 17, 1931 — January 9, 1932.
- A lebn far a lebn. Serialized in Forverts, April 21, 1932 – October 23, 1932.
- Vu iz Feni? Serialized in Forverts, April 11, 1933 – October 28, 1933.
- Ire mener. Serialized in Forverts, September 14, 1935 — January 3, 1936.
