= Jacob Milch =

Jacob Milch

Yankev Zoyermilkh (November 20, 1866 – August 18, 1945), better known by his adopted name Jacob Milch, was a Polish-born Jewish-American socialist, Yiddish writer, and chocolate manufacturer.

== Life ==
Milch was born on November 20, 1866, in Warsaw, Poland, the son of Paltiel Zoyermilkh and Goldie Berman.

Milch attended a religious elementary school. His father died when he was twelve, at which point he became an apprentice to a wood carver. When he was fifteen, he became a follower of the Jewish Enlightenment and befriended Benjamin Feigenbaum. In 1886, he went to serve in the Russian army. After finishing his military service, he returned to Warsaw. Unable to find any employment, he immigrated to America in 1891 and stayed with his friend Feigenbaum. He initially worked as a carver and joined the carvers' union and the Socialist Labor Party. With Feigenbaum's encouragement, he began writing for the Arbayter Tsaytung (Workers’ Newspaper) in October 1891. He wrote mainly satirical-polemical articles and a weekly column called Gedanken fun a prostak (Thoughts of a boor) that interpreted Marxism in a popular manner for the masses. During the Panic of 1893, he left his well-paying job in a furniture factory to become secretary of the United Hebrew Trades and organize a relief action that fed hundreds of unemployed people daily. He also became a member of the Arbayter Tsaytung publishing association and sat on its executive board.

Milch worked in the candy jobbing business from 1896 to 1899. In 1900, he became a member of the candy jobbers firm Levine Bros, Inc. The firm began manufacturing chocolate in 1906, and it was renamed Elbee Chocolate Co., Inc. He was vice-president of the firm by 1938. He served as treasurer of the Jewish Teachers Seminary from 1920 to 1930. He edited the Jewish scientific monthly Zukunft in 1907 and was editor and publisher of the quarterly Die Neue Welt in 1909. He wrote several works in Yiddish, including a three-volume set of books called Jewish Problems in 1920, Philosophic Chats in 1924, an essay comparing Spinoza and Marx in 1932, and a pamphlet on Birobidzhan in 1936. Zichronot, his memoirs on the origin of The Forward, was published in 1936. He translated works by Peretz Smolenskin and Gerhart Hauptmann into Yiddish, and in 1928 he published a Yiddish translation of Plato's Dialogues. He was also a collaborator on the Morgen Freiheit.

Milch was a member of the Yiddish Scientific Institute. In 1895, he married Fannie Levine. Their children were Dr. Henry and Victor.

Milch died at his home in 263 Eastern Parkway, Brooklyn, following a brief illness on August 18, 1945. He was buried in New Montefiore Cemetery.
