= Greenwood Cemetery (Atlanta) =

Cemetery in Georgia, United States

- Interactive map of Greenwood Cemetery

Details
- Established: 1904; 122 years ago
- Location: Atlanta, Georgia
- Country: United States
- Coordinates: 33°43′32″N 84°27′14″W
- Type: Public
- Find a Grave: Greenwood Cemetery

Greenwood Cemetery is located at 1173 Cascade Circle SW, Atlanta, Fulton County, Georgia, United States.

== History ==
Greenwood Cemetery was chartered in late 1904 with a cash capital of $100,000. The incorporators were William H. Brown and James L. Mayson. The first direct interment was in 1907. Greenwood has a large Jewish section and is also the burial place of local Chinese and Greek citizens. Greenwood cemetery was desegregated in 1987, when CR Jones, Atlanta's first black council member, was buried there.

The cemetery contains one British Commonwealth war grave, of a Second World War airman of the Royal Canadian Air Force who was killed in a training accident.

In November 2026, the cemetery filed for Chapter 11 bankruptcy protection after being accused of fraudulent activity regarding 20 people being found in the wrong graves.

=== Chinese section ===
The Chinese lot is enclosed on three sides by an iron-pipe rail fence. In the center stands an obelisk some 30 feet tall. Near its base, and under another inscription in Chinese is the following: CHEE HUNG TONG, CHINESE FREE MASONS, Sept. 8, 1911. Many of the individual graves on the lot are marked by small headstones, inscribed in Chinese characters.

=== Greek section ===
The Greek section, about an acre in size, is bounded by a hedge. Like the Chinese lot, it was opened in 1911. There are many impressive monuments in it, practically all inscribed in Greek. In the southwest corner stands a small church, resembling a miniature Parthenon and constructed of yellow brick.

== Holocaust memorial ==
A stone was placed in Greenwood with the inscription, "Here rest four bars of human soap, the last earthly remains of Jewish victims of the Holocaust." The soap is said to have been found by a Jewish soldier who helped liberate a concentration camp during World War II. In 1970, the soldier's wife had the bars of soap buried after discovering them in her basement. However, there is considerable dispute over whether the Nazis actually made soap from victims, and the site remains controversial. A Memorial to the Six Million, a granite monument topped by six torches, also commemorates the Holocaust, each torch representing 1 million Jews killed in concentration camps. A Memorial to the Six Million was listed on the National Register of Historic Places in May 2008.

== Notable interments ==
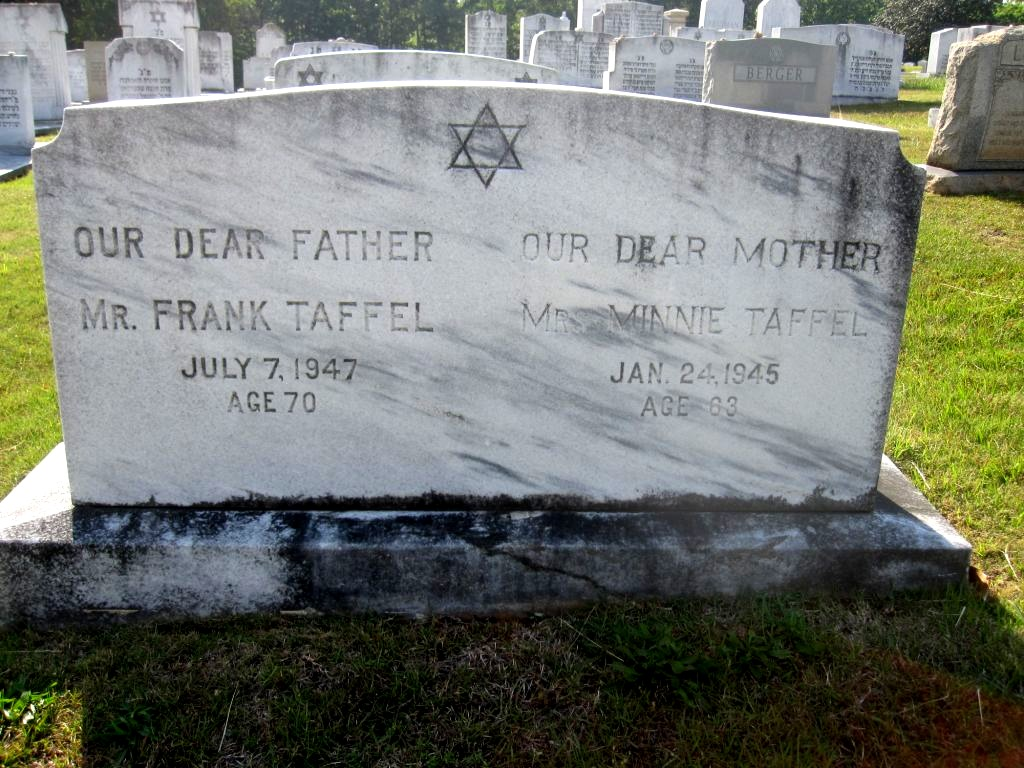
Grave of Frank Taffel and Minnie Taffel

- Hank Ballard (1927–2003) singer, songwriter
- S. Truett Cathy (1921–2014) founder of Chick-fil-A
- Frank Taffel (1877–1947) Synagogue founder and journalist
