= Sarah Belchetz-Swenson =

American painter (1938–2021)

- Born: Sarah Belchetz; May 24, 1938; Cairo, Egypt
- Died: September 12, 2021 (aged 83)
- Known for: Painting, printmaker, portraits

Sarah Belchetz-Swenson (née Belchetz; May 24, 1938 – September 12, 2021) was a painter, printmaker, and portraitist.

Belchetz-Swenson was born in Cairo, Egypt, in 1938, the daughter of Arnold and Pearl Belchetz. Raised in suburban Larchmont, New York, at age 13, she signed herself up for life-drawing classes at the Art Students' League in New York and spent Saturdays there through high school. She majored in studio art at Oberlin College, focusing on modern and historical painting and printing techniques. She briefly engaged with the New York art scene, supported by fellow artists, including her cousin Rudolf Baranik (who wrote the introduction to her Holocaust memorial Revisions) and the feminist painter May Stevens. She later moved to Johnson, Vermont, with her husband, Victor Swenson, and their two daughters. Following a divorce in the early 1990s, she settled in Williamsburg, Massachusetts.

Rites, Belchetz-Swenson's most widely-exhibited work, is a series of fourteen paintings, four monotypes, and four lithographs, linking scenes from the lives of contemporary women and girls with images from the Villa of the Mysteries in Pompeii.
