= Jewish Alcoholics, Chemically Dependent Persons and Significant Others =

Jewish Alcoholics, Chemical Dependents and Significant Others (JACS) was "founded in 1979 by the New York Federation of Jewish Philanthropies."

Part of their work includes "a speakers' bureau and publishing a directory of resources for families in crisis."

== History ==
One of the founders of the JACS Long Island branch explained why Jewish Alcoholics, Chemical Dependents and Significant Others was formed, rather than direct people to Alcoholics Anonymous: "to an observant Jew who has to meet in a church basement ... not always going to work." Another co-founder added that even to "help save one life ... one of the highest commandments."

One Jewish doctor was anonymously quoted by The New York Times as saying that:

Most 12-step programs have a religious overtone, and it's difficult for people who were raised Jewish to feel initially comfortable with mainstream ideology that is Christian-oriented.

JACS also has a unit called Teen Network, and, like the parent organization, it focuses across various degrees of religiosity. and several JACS members formed a group "for alcoholics who are children of Holocaust survivors."

A 2001 study by JACS of residents at a Jewish treatment center reported self-identification of 10% Orthodox, 28% Conservative, 32% Reform and 30% non-affiliated.

== Blend ==
The Orthodox Union, which runs some of the Birthright Israel trips, was approached by a JACS program director with 15 years of experience to allow her to "run a trip for young Jewish addicts in recovery" and, later on she became "North American director of the OU's ... Israel Birthright" trips.
