= Jewish Record =

Jewish Record may refer to:

- The Jewish Record (Atlantic City) (1939–1996), a weekly newspaper
- The Jewish Record, a 19th-century Philadelphia magazine founded by Alfred T. Jones
- Contemporary Jewish Record (1938–1945), a magazine succeeded by Commentary
