= Samuel Margoshes =

Galician-born Jewish-American Yiddish journalist, newspaper editor, and Zionist

Samuel Margoshes (October 21, 1887 – August 23, 1968) was a Galician-born Jewish-American Yiddish journalist, newspaper editor, and Zionist.

== Life ==
Margoshes was born on October 21, 1887, in the village of Józefów, near Tarnów, Galicia. He was descended from Maharsha and Rashi. His grandfather Shmuel-Arye Margoshes edited the Maḥazike Hadat (Strengthening the Faith), a Hebrew periodical from the court of the Belz Rebbe, in the 1860s. He was the son of Joseph Margoshes and Lea Rachel Stieglitz.

Margoshes attended the cheder and yeshiva, after which he went to the gymnasium in Tarnów. He immigrated to America in 1905. He entered the Jewish Theological Seminary of America in 1907, graduating from there as a rabbi in 1911. He studied philosophy and sociology at Columbia University from 1908 to 1911, graduating from there with an M.A. in 1911. He also studied education in Teachers College, Columbia University. In 1917, he received the degree of Doctor of Hebrew Literature from the Jewish Theological Seminary.

In 1910, Margoshes wrote "Curriculum of the Jewish Schools in Germany, 1648 to 1848." From 1912 to 1917, he was director of the text-book department of the Bureau of Jewish Education. He was then director of education for the Jewish Welfare Board from 1917 to 1918. He was president of the Federation of Galician Jews of America from 1916 to 1920. He was also a member of the board of governors of the American Jewish Congress and a member of the administrative committee of Zionist Organization of America. From 1920 to 1921, he executive director of Keren Hayesod in Canada.

Margoshes began writing in 1904, when he wrote a Hebrew sketch of David Frischmann's Hador (The Generation). When he initially arrived in America, he spent his evenings with the group of writers known as Di Yunge, which included his friend from Tarnów Reuben Iceland. In 1907, he published a story in Yankev Fefer’s Yidisher Vokhnblat (Jewish Weekly Newspaper). A year later, he became a regular contributor for the newspaper. In 1907, he and Iceland also bought out Di Yidishe Shtime (The Jewish Voice). In 1919, he travelled to Poland to distribute food parcels. When he returned to America, he became a founder of the People's Relief, the Joint Distribution Committee, and the American Jewish Congress.

In 1922, Margoshes began working for Der Tog. He served as editor for the paper from 1926 to 1942, and was also an English columnist and a commentator on Jewish events for the paper. An active Zionist, he participated in World Zionist congresses and served on the Zionist General Council for many years. He was vice-president of the American Jewish Congress from 1935 to 1939, the Zionist Organization of America from 1950 to 1952, and the Jewish Writers Union. He was public relations director of the JNF. In 1929, he wrote a series of dispatches in Der Tog about the 1929 Palestine riots. His dispatches appeared in the New York Herald Tribune and other newspapers, described Arab attacks on Jewish communities in Palestine, repeatedly charged British officials of being responsible for the attacks, and claimed British policemen remained in their garrisons during the outbreak.

Margoshes visited the Soviet Union in 1931, and his subsequent articles on Jewish life in that country sparked sharp debate in the Yiddish press. In 1934, he organized a Jewish mass march in New York to protest Nazi violence. He worked with Abraham Coralnik to establish a boycott of Nazi goods. The Danish king awarded him the Medal of Merit for his service on Denmark's behalf during World War II. His volume, In Gang fun Doyres (In the Course of Generations), was published after his death.

In 1904, Margoshes married Rose Kirschenbaum. Rose wrote for the Jewish press in Yiddish and English under the pen-name Kirschenbaum-Margoshes, worked as a translator on Ellis Island to help Jewish immigrants, and did social work in the Henry Street Settlement on the Lower East Side. Their son Adam was an associate professor of psychology at Shippensburg State College.

Margoshes died after a long illness on August 23, 1968. He was buried in Montefiore Cemetery.
