= Jacob Magidoff =

American lawyer

Jacob Magidoff (June 22, 1869 – August 26, 1943) was a Russian-born Jewish-American Yiddish journalist and newspaper editor.

== Life ==
Magidoff was born on June 22, 1869, in Odessa, Russia, the son of Aaron Magidoff and Dora Aronovitz.

Magidoff attended a religious primary school, a Russian school, and an Odessa high school. He immigrated to America in 1886, settling in New York and initially working in the sweatshops as a shirt stitcher while studying in the evening. A leader in the Jewish labor movement, he was an initiator and co-founder of the United Hebrew Trades in 1888 and an active member of the Socialist Labor Party. He worked for some time as an English teacher while studying at New York University School of Law. He was admitted to the bar in 1904, but he only worked as a lawyer for a few years before he began working full-time in Yiddish journalism. He graduated from New York University with an LL.B. in 1902.

In 1894, Magidoff became associate editor of the Arbeiter Zeitung. From 1896 to 1899, he was city editor of Dos Abend Blatt. He then worked for the Jewish Daily News from 1896 to 1899, followed by the Abendpost from 1900 to 1901. In 1901, he became city editor of the Jewish Morning Journal. In 1926, he became the paper's chief editorial writer. He relinquished the position of city editor in 1935, but he remained an editorial writer for the paper. He ran a daily column in the paper called "Kurts un Sharf” (Short and Sharp). He also wrote for the monthly journals Di Tsukunft (The Future) and Di Naye Tsayt (The New Times) from 1898 to 1899, and was at one point a contributor to The Forward. From 1925 to 1928, he edited the weekly Der Amerikaner (The American), which published articles on Yiddish writers. He visited the Soviet Union in 1928 and wrote a series of articles depicting life under the Soviet regime. In 1923, he published a volume of characterizations on Jewish personalities in New York called Der Shpigl fun der Ist Said (The Mirror of the East Side).

In 1896, Magidoff married Tinnie Jacobson. Their children were Bella, Helen, and Dorothy.

Magidoff died at his home in 120 Ocean Parkway in Brooklyn on August 26, 1943.
