= Gershom Bader =

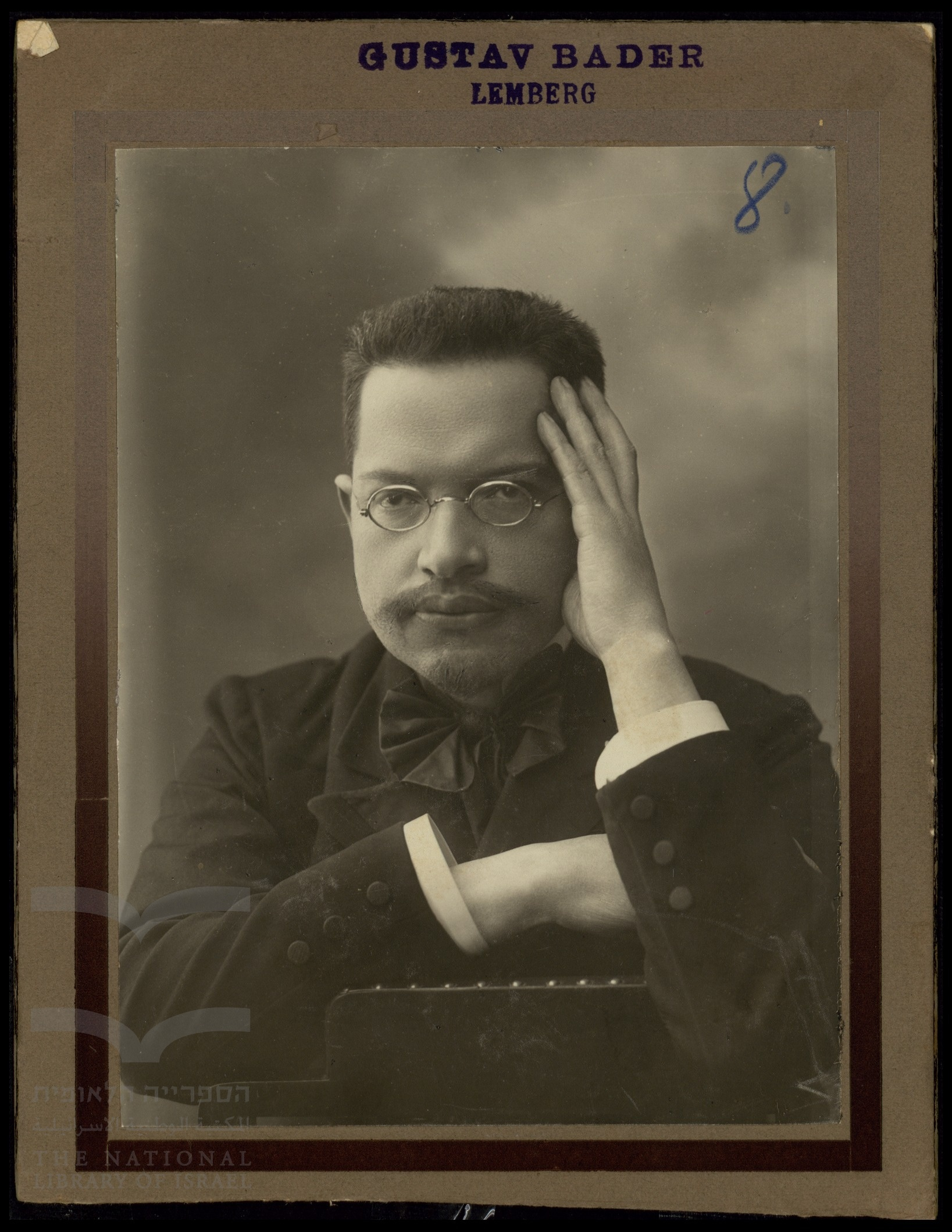
Portrait of Bader

Gershom Bader (August 21, 1868 – November 11, 1953) was a Jewish Galician-American writer, journalist, and playwright who wrote in Hebrew and Yiddish.

== Life ==
Bader was born on August 21, 1868, in Kraków, Galicia. His ancestry included Shabbatai HaKohen and Isaiah Horowitz. His parents were Isaac Moses and Helen Bader. His father was a Yiddish writer.

Bader received a traditional education and studied German and Polish. When he was thirteen, he became personal secretary of the Chief Rabbi of Kraków, Shimon Sofer, and a tutor of the rabbi's grandchildren. When he was sixteen, he went to Berlin to study in the Orthodox seminary led by Azriel Hildesheimer. He left the seminary after a year and returned to Kraków. Until 1888, he wandered among Kraków's neighboring provincial towns and villages. He moved to Kolomyia when he was twenty and edited the Hebrew scientific literary weekly Ha-Shemesh, only to return to Kraków shortly afterwards to teach Hebrew at a teachers seminary. He published articles in Hebrew papers since his youth to express his views on social and political subjects. Although he was religious, he was critical of the conservative and pro-Hasidic policies of the established Jewish orthodoxy and became a supporter of the Zionist Hibbat Zion movement.

Bader moved to Lviv in 1894, where he worked as a teacher, and became active in Yiddish literary life and the Zionist movement. He initially published in the Yiddish weekly Ha-Karmel. In 1898, he became editor of the biweekly Ha-Ivri. He was the founder of Tageblat, the first Yiddish newspaper in Galicia, and served as its editor from 1904 to 1906. He published the Yudisher Folks-Kalendar (Jewish People’s Calendar) from 1896 to 1912 and the anthology Shtraln (Rays of the Sun). He was a contributor to, among other newspapers and periodicals, Der Yud, Tsukunft, Zhitlowsky’s Dos Naye Leben, Pardes, and Ha-Shiloaḥ. He also wrote several stage pieces, including Tate-Mames Tsores (Trouble for Parents), Nont Baym Fayer (Near to the Fire), Yisroel Bal Shem Tov, R’ Chaim Raytses, Der Amerikaner Doktor (The American Doctor), and Di Goldene Royz (The Golden Rose).

Bader translated the Book of Genesis into Polish and published textbooks on the Hebrew language. In 1895 and 1896, he published two anthologies, Leket Peraḥim and Zer Peraḥim, that helped popularize Hebrew literature. In 1896, he edited the fifth volume of the literary miscellany Oẓar ha-Sifrut. In 1889, he wrote Ḥelkat Meḥokek, a life of Jesus. From 1903 to 1904, he produced the Hebrew annual miscellany Ḥermon. In 1904, he edited the Yiddish literary collection Shtrain, with an additional volume for the collection being published in 1909. In 1907, he edited the short-lived Hebrew newspaper Ha-'Et. In 1908, he founded the Nayster Lemberger Togblat, which only lasted a brief time.

Bader immigrated to America in 1912 and became a staff writer at several Jewish journals and correspondent for European Yiddish and Hebrew periodicals. He published a book of essays on the Bible and Jewish life called Eibige Emen fun Leben in 1927, Dreisig Doires Yudn in Poilen in 1927, a three-volume history on the creators of the Mishnah called Our Spiritual Heroes from 1934 to 1935, and a collection of Jewish anecdotes called Dibre Chen Vesechel in 1935. He also wrote a lexicon of Galician Jewish cultural figures called Medinah va-Ḥakhameha in 1934, a dictionary of Talmudic abbreviations called Mafte'aḥ le-Rashei Tevot in 1951, and his memoirs, Mayne Zikhroynes, in 1953. While in New York, he wrote for the Togblat. He was a featured writer for the Jewish Morning Journal from 1927 until his death. He was also honorary vice-president of the Federation of Polish Jews in America.

One of Bader's plays, a four-act drama called "In a Cellar", was staged in New York in 1910 with Keni Liptzin. Other plays were performed in New York after he moved there in 1912, including "Der Rebe in Feyer," "Tsvishn Libe un Toyt," "Froy Gleybt Froy," "The Rabbi's Melody" in 1919 (starring Ludwig Satz and with music from Joseph Rumshinsky), and "Di Goldene Royze" in 1920 (starring Boris Thomashefsky and Kessler and with music from Herman Wohl). He published a number of articles and critiques on the Yiddish theater. In 1908, he cofounded the Goldfaden Association, which was founded to protect the interests of stage artists, with Julius Gutman, Matityahu Thur, and Norman Glimer. He was also president of the Association at one point. In the 1912 Jewish People's Calendar, he published biographies and photographs of association members, the first European attempt to publish biographies and photographs of Yiddish actors.

In 1892, Bader married Joanna Kluger in Kraków. Their children were Maximilian, Mary, Dorothea, Milton, and Jewell.

Bader died in Beth Israel Hospital from a brief illness on November 11, 1953. He was buried in Mount Lebanon Cemetery in Glendale, Queens.
