= Isaac Mayer Dick =

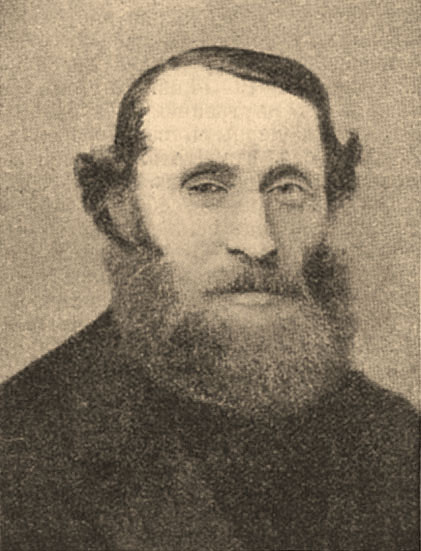
Isaac Mayer Dick

Isaac Mayer Dick (1807 – 24 January 1893) was a Jewish Hebraist, born in the Russian Empire, a Yiddishist, and novelist.

== Life ==
Dick was born in Vilnius. His father, who was a hazzan, gave him a conventional Talmudic education, and Dick was also instructed in the Bible and Hebrew. He married while still young and while living with his wife's parents in Nesvizh, Minsk, became acquainted with a Catholic priest who clandestinely taught him the German language. Dick also acquired a knowledge of Russian and Polish at this time and on his return to Vilnius acted as private teacher of Hebrew and German, having for one of his pupils Mattityahu Strashun, who remained his lifelong friend. In 1841 Dick became teacher of Hebrew in the newly founded government school for Jewish boys in Vilnius.

The visit of Sir Moses Montefiore to Vilnius in 1846 was the occasion of a great outburst of literary productions in Montefiore's honor. Dick described the visit in Ha-Oreaḥ (The Guest), published at Königsberg in 1860. Dick was one of the founders and for many years the shammash of the Synagogue Ṭohorat ha-Ḳodesh, modeled after the Shoḥare ha-Ṭob of Berlin of Mendelssohn's time and known in Vilnius as the "Berliner Schul" because it dared introduce minor reforms of the service in accordance with the ideas of Mendelssohn's maskilim, who were called "Berliner". Dick sought to educate and enhance the socioeconomic status of all Russian Jews and corresponded on that subject with Count Uvarov, minister of education under Nicholas I. Dick declared himself in favor of enforcing the ordinance compelling the Jews of Lithuania to dress in German or European fashion, though in his own dress and manners he remained an old-style Jew to the last, believing that he could thus do more good than if he broke with old associations and boldly joined the new generation.

Dick was known as a conversationalist, his fame as a wit spreading far outside of Vilnius, with anecdotes being told in his name and about him long beyond his lifetime. In later years he was employed by the publishing house of Romm at a small weekly salary to write Yiddish stories; and his productions of that nature, of various sizes, are said to number nearly three hundred, but no complete bibliography of works of that nature exists. He continued to live in Vilnius, and died there in 1893.

In addition to that mentioned above, Dick wrote three Hebrew works: Maḥazeh Mul Maḥazeh, a Purim story (Warsaw, 1861); Siprono, a description of Jewish life in small cities (Vilnius, 1868); and Masseket 'Aniyyut (Tractate Poverty), considered one of the best Talmudical parodies ever written. But his fame rests on his Yiddish novels, a field in which he was the first professional and the founder of a school. As he himself asserted many times, he wrote only for the purpose of spreading knowledge and morality among his readers, and in many cases he permitted this purpose to overshadow the story. Most of the modern critics condemn his style; his constant use of High-German words, explained, often wrongly, in parenthesis; his quotations from the Talmud and Midrashim with his own commentaries, retarding the flow of the narrative; and his pausing at a dialogue or other interesting point to insert a long sermon on the moral lesson to be drawn from incidents described in the story. But in spite of all verbosity and deviation, Dick was an excellent story-teller, having a power of description, an insight into human character, and a sympathetic humor which are given to few. His longer works are chiefly translations, and are the least worthy of his writings; but among the shorter ones are many original stories, some of which, if divested of superfluous matter, could well bear an English translation. Der Yiddischer Posliannik (The Jewish Ambassador), Vilnius, 1880; Note Ganaf (Life of Nathan the Thief), Vilnius 1887; and Die Schöne Minka, Vilnius 1886, have considerable merit; while some of his characters, such as "Shemaya Gut Yom-Ṭob Bitter" (the holiday visitor), "Chaitzikel Allein," or "Der Moiziter Bachur," rank among the best efforts of the present Yiddish writers.

== Jewish Encyclopedia bibliography ==
- Obituaries in Ha-Asif and Aḥiasaf, Warsaw, 1894;
- Wiener, History of Yiddish Literature, pp. 169–172, New York, 1899;
- Zolotkoff, in Stadt-Anzeiger, Oct. 15, 1893;
- Ha-Shaḥar, v. 349 et seq.;
- Hausfreund, 1894, vol. iii.;
- Winter and Wünsche, Die Jüdische Litteratur, pp. 585–603.H. R. P. Wi.
