= Der Tog =

Yiddish-language daily newspaper

- Type: daily newspaper
- Founded: 1914
- Ceased publication: 1971
- Language: Yiddish
- Headquarters: Lower East Side 185 and 187 East Broadway, New York City, New York, USA
- Country: United States

Der Tog (Yiddish: דער טאָג, lit. 'The Day') was a Yiddish-language daily newspaper published in New York City from 1914 until 1971. The offices of Der Tog were located on the Lower East Side, at 185 and 187 East Broadway.

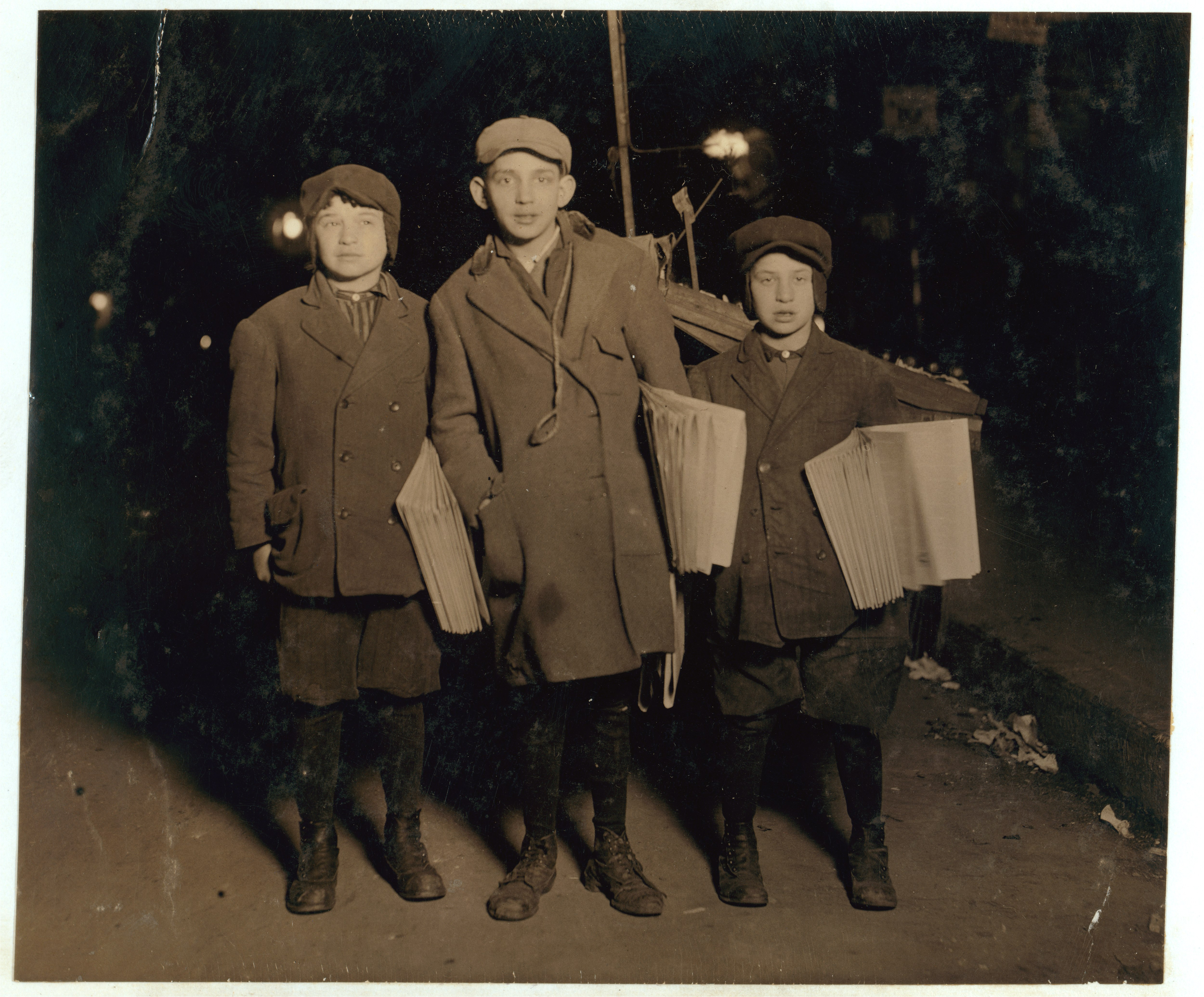
Three boys selling Di Varhayt at midnight on Delancey Street, 1913.

== History ==
The newspaper's first issue was on November 5, 1914. At its peak Der Tog reached a circulation of 81,000, in 1916. It had a weekly English-language supplement entitled The Day, edited by Marion Weinstein. In 1919 Der Tog absorbed another Yiddish newspaper, Di Varhayt (Warheit; Wahrheit; "The Truth"), and between 1919 and 1922 was known as Der Tog, di Varhayt.

In 1953 Der Tog merged with the Morgn Zshurnal (Morning Journal), and subsequently appeared under the title Der Tog Morgn Zshurnal; the circulation was estimated at 50,000 in 1970, and the paper ceased publication in 1971.

Der Algemeiner Journal was founded in 1972, intended to fill the gap after the closure of Der Tog Morgen Zhurnal.

== Journalists and writers ==
The founding of the newspaper was the project of a group of businessmen and intellectuals including Judah Leib Magnes, David Shapiro, Morris Weinberg, and Herman Bernstein. Bernstein became the paper's first editor and Shapiro assumed the role of publisher. Styled in its masthead as a "newspaper for the Jewish intelligentsia," Der Tog sought to uphold high journalistic and literary standards, and to rise above ideological divides.

Under William Edlin, who succeeded Bernstein as editor in 1916, and the first literary editor, Benzion Hoffman (Zivion), the newspaper attracted a talented staff, including Shmuel Niger, who was its literary critic for many years, as well his brother the poet, author, and journalist Daniel Charney, who was a member of the editorial staff starting in 1925.

Among the other staff writers were David Pinski, Aron Glanz (A. Leyeles), Joel Slonim, Peretz Hirshbein, and Abraham Coralnik. Other significant contributors included Chaim Zhitlowsky, Jeremiah Hescheles and Samuel Rosenfeld, as well as H. Leivick, Osip Dymov, and Reuben Iceland. Leon Kobrin was the paper's chief fiction writer for nearly two decades; and among the more famous of other occasional literary contributors were Joseph Opatoshu and Abraham Reisen. The newspaper also published the entirety of the Bible translation by the poet Yehoash (pseudonym of Solomon Bloomgarden), and some works of Sholem Aleichem.

Edlin, who had been associated with the paper from its beginnings as a news editor and a theater critic, remained editor in chief until 1925. Samuel Margoshes filled that role from 1926 until 1942. At that point Edlin came back and led the paper again, until his death, in 1947. Solomon Dingol became editor-in-chief following Edlin's death, and was still editor when Der Tog merged with the Morning Journal in 1953.

According to Edlin, Der Tog was the first Yiddish newspaper to include female journalists on the editorial staff. Adella Kean Zametkin wrote about women's issues, and Dr. Ida Badanes, about health matters; the popular fiction writer Sarah B. Smith was also a regular contributor over many years. Before making her mark as a poet, Anna Margolin (pseudonym of Rosa Lebensboym) distinguished herself as a reporter and editor for Der Tog, contributing a column, "In der froyen velt" (In the women's world), under her actual name, and articles about women's issues under various pseudonyms, including Clara Levin. Miriam Karpilove published several novels in Der Tog. The paper also serialized the only novel by Blume Lempel in 1947.
