= Jewish Morning Journal =

American Yiddish publication

The Jewish Morning Journal
- Type: Daily except Saturday newspaper
- Format: broadsheet
- Owner: Jewish Press Publishing Company
- Publisher: Jacob Saphirstein; Israel Friedkin
- Editor: Peter Wiernik; Jacob Fishman; M.J. Nurenberger; Bernard Bergman
- Staff writers: B. Gorin; A. Mukdoni; Jacob Glatstein, city editor Jacob Grinberg; Gedaliah Bublick; Frank Taffel, Atlanta correspondent Jacob Magidoff, city editor
- Founded: 1901
- Ceased publication: 1971
- Political alignment: Republican
- Headquarters: New York
- Circulation: 111,000 (in 1916)

The Jewish Morning Journal (Yiddish: דער מארגען זשורנאל, romanized: Der Morgen Zhurnal) was a Yiddish-language publication in New York from 1901 to 1971.

== History ==
A politically conservative, Orthodox Jewish publisher, Jacob Saphirstein, founded the Jewish Morning Journal in 1901. It was published in Yiddish, the language of the majority of eastern European Jewish immigrants who settled on the Lower East Side of New York. The paper took on a more liberal slant in 1916, when Jacob Fishman became editor, replacing Peter (Peretz) Wiernik. After resigning as editor in 1938, Fishman continued his daily column, "From Day to Day."

Zionist in outlook, the Jewish Morning Journal advocated an Orthodox lifestyle, and was not published on Saturday, the Jewish Sabbath. It was a staunch advocate of the Americanization of the Eastern European immigrants who formed the bulk of its readership. Along with other Yiddish publications, its circulation declined steadily after World War I, as immigrants became more assimilated and used English.

In 1928 the Jewish Morning Journal merged with the Yidishes Tagblat (Yiddish יידישעס טאגעבלאט). Morris Cohen, a Canadian philanthropist, bought the Jewish Morning Journal in 1949. In 1953 the combined entity merged with the liberal Yiddish daily Jewish Day (Der Tog).

In 1955, during a Satmar protest at the Manhattan Center against the establishment of a night club in Jerusalem, the Krasna Rav, Hillel Lichtenstein, publicly tore up a copy of Der Morgn-Zhurnal as a sign of disapproval of its pro-Zionist stance.

In 1970 the circulation of The Day-Morning Journal was 50,000. The paper ceased publication in 1971.

== Noted journalists ==
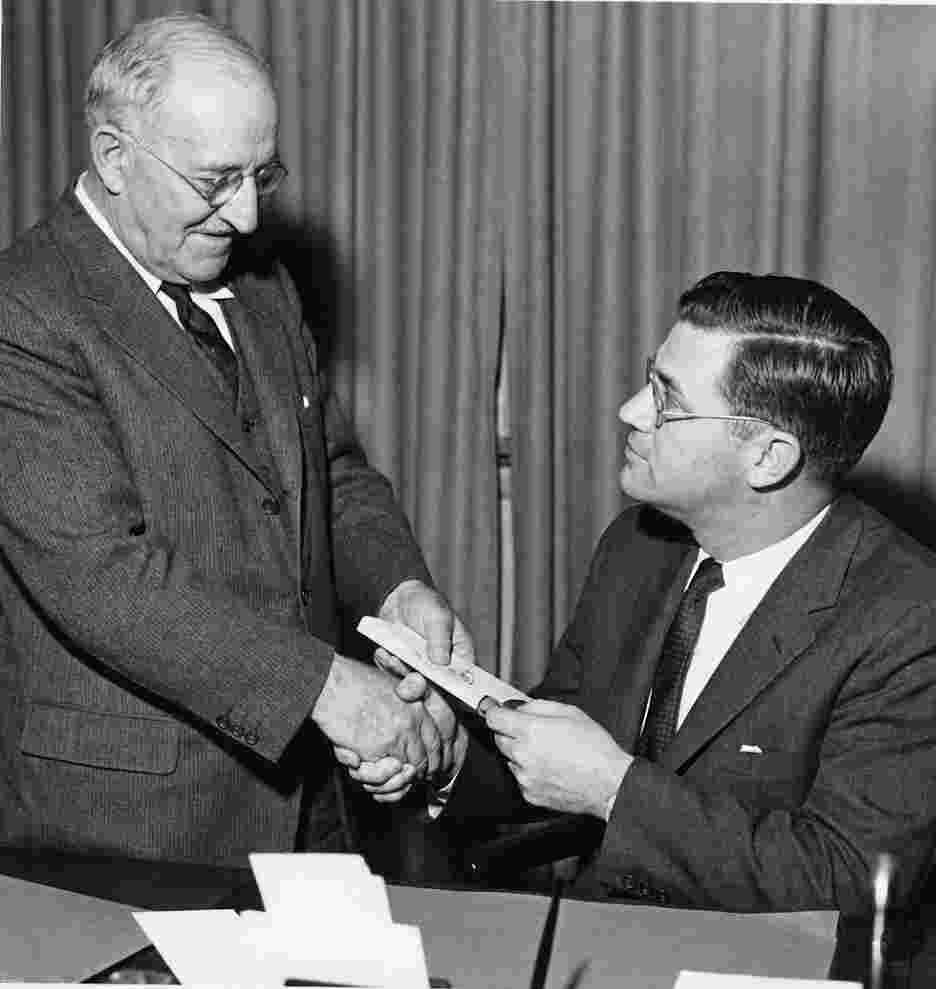
Georgia Governor Eugene Talmadge (right) extends a 1933 New Year greeting to Jewlsh cltlzens through Frank Taffel (left). In a letter to the Jewish Morning Journal, Talmadge protested persecution of Jews by the German government.

- Gershom Bader
- Bernard Gorin
- Jacob Glatstein
- Gedaliah Bublick
- Frank Taffel, Atlanta correspondent
- Philip Krantz
- Jacob Magidoff
- Joseph Margoshes
- S.L. Shneiderman
- Abner Tannenbaum
- Peter Wiernik
- M.J. Nurenberger (correspondent who became editor in 1947)
- S. B. Komaiko
