= Dos Abend Blatt =

New York Yiddish-language daily newspaper

- Type: Daily
- Publisher: Socialist Labor Party
- Editor: Philip Krantz (1894-1899)
- Founded: 1894
- Ceased publication: 1902
- Political alignment: socialist
- Language: Yiddish
- Sister newspapers: Di arbeter tsaytung

Dos Abend Blatt (The Evening Paper; original extensive title Yiddish: אבענד בלאטט פון דיא ארבייטער צייטונג; Abend blatt fun di arbeyter tseytung) was a Yiddish-language daily newspaper published in New York City, United States. Dos Abend Blatt was launched as an outgrowth of the weekly Di Arbeter Tsaytung (Workman's Paper). Published between 1894 and 1902, it was an organ of the Socialist Labor Party of America (SLP).

Dos Abend Blatt was the first socialist Yiddish daily to appear in New York. During its early phase, Dos Abend Blatt rivaled the readership of the anarchist Freie Arbeiter Stimme and, later, the bourgeois-orthodox Yiddisher Tagesblatt. The newspaper was sponsored by the United Hebrew Trades.

Politically, Dos Abend Blatt argued in favour of an internationalist line, denouncing national chauvinism, labor nationalism and Zionism. It called on Jewish workers to unite along class lines, rather than building an identity around their language and/or religion (Yiddishkeit). Regarding antisemitism, Dos Abend Blatt argued that the problem had economic roots and thus Jewish nationalism was not an adequate answer. However, the news section of the paper carried frequent reports on antisemitism and pogroms around the world.

In 1897 a split erupted amongst the Jewish cadres of the SLP. A dissident minority group was expelled in June 1897. The majority group, represented by Philip Krantz, Benjamin Feigenbaum, Jacob Milch and Joseph Schlossberg, retained control over Dos Abend Blatt. The dissidents founded a new Yiddish socialist newspaper, Forverts. Competition between Forverts and Dos Abend Blatt became fierce, a contest which Dos Abend Blatt would eventually lose. Two political issues, in which Forverts adopted a far more pragmatic approach in appealing to Jewish communal sentiments, proved decisive in the competition; the Dreyfus affair and the Spanish–American War.

Regarding the Dreyfus affair, Dos Abend Blatt found itself at loggerheads with large sectors of the Jewish community. The editor of the paper, Philip Krantz, questioned the innocence of Dreyfus. This position would prove largely unpopular amongst the Yiddish-speaking community.

At the time of the Cuba war, Dos Abend Blatt was one of the first newspapers to voice opposing to the policies of the American government. The paper, through the editorials of Krantz and Benjamin Feygenbaum, opposed the nationalist fervour that the war aroused, and argued that the war was carried out for the benefit of the dominant classes, that Cuba would not be liberated but put under American rule and that the working class was suffering the losses at the battlefield. The paper argued against the discourse that Spain was an eternal enemy of the Jewish people.

In July 1899 the SLP split into two. Those loyal to Daniel De Leon retained control over Dos Abend Blatt, but several prominent members (such as Krantz and Feygenbaum) had joined the other camp and subsequently left the paper.

By 1900, there was an attempt to popularize Dos Abend Blatt amongst the Jewish community, through introduction of 'Jewish News' and 'Jewish Letters' (from abroad) sections. However, this shift in editorial policy gave little benefit, as Forverts had already won over major sections of readership by consistently appealing to the notion of Yiddishkeit.

Dos Abend Blatt and Di Arbeter Tsaytung both terminated publication in 1902.

== Bibliography ==
- Milkh, Yaʻaḳov, and Louis Lazarus. The Rise of the "Forward" and Its Struggle with the "Abend Blatt" (1893-1902): Reminiscences. New York: [Louis Lazarus], 1958.
