= Benjamin J. Bialostotzky =

Russian-American poet (1893–1962)

Benjamin Jacob Bialostotzky (June 15, 1893 - September 22, 1962) was a Lithuanian-born Jewish-American Yiddish poet.

== Life ==
Bialostotzky was born on June 15, 1893, in Pompiany, Kovno Governorate, Russian Empire, the son of the Grodner Maggid.

Bialostozky attended religious elementary schools and yeshivas in Panevėžys and Kaunas. When he was young, he was a member of the Kovno Zionist territorialists and wrote correspondence pieces for Saint Petersburg's Fraynd under the pen name A. Pumpyaner. He published his first literary piece in 1909, a poem called "Fartsveyflung" (Despair) in A. Litvin's Vilnius Lebn un Visnshaft. He immigrated to Germany in 1910, and, in 1911, he arrived in the United States.

He lived in New York City and studied in the City College of New York. He joined Poale Zion in 1914. He founded Yiddish schools in America, and he worked as a teacher in the National Front and Workmen's Circle schools. He was a member of the Workmen's Circle pedagogical council for many years, and was a cofounder and active participant of various Yiddish cultural organizations. He contributed poems and essays to a number of magazines and newspapers under the pen names B. Y. Belkin, Ben Ha-magid, Sh. S. Heler, Aviv, and B. Y. B. From 1918 to 1919, he was on the editorial board of Yunger Yidisher Kemfer. In 1919, he edited Di Kinder-Velt, the first children's magazine in Yiddish, with Joel Entin and Sh. Shapiro. He was managing editor and editorial secretary of Yidisher Kemfer from 1919 to 1920. From 1920 to 1922, he was editorial secretary of David Pinski's Di Tsayt. He became a regular contributor to The Forward starting in 1922. From 1927 to 1932, he edited the literary journal Oyfkum with Z. Veynper and Ber Lapin.

Bialostozky's childhood memories of his Lithuanian hometown were reflected in his poems, although he primarily focused on New York City. He believed American Jews had to accept the fact they left the small communities that formed Yiddish culture and became city dwellers, and Yiddish poets should reproduce the sights of rhythms of urban civilization. His early model was Morris Rosenfeld, to whom he dedicated essays and whose influence appeared in his 1920 social songs Beim Breiten Veg (Along the Highway). His works dealt with the poverty on the Lower East Side. His simple children's songs, set to music by Solomon Golub and Mikhl Gelbart, were sung in Yiddish elementary schools, his poetic tales fascinated young audiences, and his 1940 Bienele was described by one source as his masterpiece for children.

Bialostozky's works were first collected in Lider un Eseyen (Poems and Essays) in 1932. In 1953, he edited a memorial volume for the poet David Edelstadt. His own volume of poetry was published in the 1958 Lid tsu Lid (Poem to Poem) and included his bibliography by E. H. Jeshurin. His studies in Jewish folklore led to several collections of legends, including Fun Golus Bovl bis Roym (From the Babylonian Exile to Rome) in 1949, Di Mesholim fun Dubner Magid (Parables of the Maggid of Dubno) in 1962, and Yidisher Humor un Yidishe Leytsim (Jewish Humor and Jewish Jesters) in 1963.

Bialostozky died at his home in the Bronx on September 22, 1962, aged 69. He was buried in the Workmen's Circle section of Mount Carmel Cemetery.
