= Abraham Liessin =

American journalist

Abraham Walt (May 19, 1872 – November 5, 1938), better known by his pen name Abraham Liessin, was a Belarusian-born Jewish-American socialist activist, Yiddish poet, and newspaper editor.

== Life ==
Liessin was born on May 19, 1872, in Minsk, Minsk Governorate, Russian Empire. On his mother's side, he was descended from the Maharshal, the Ba'al Halevushim, and Rabbi Raphael Cohen. His parents were Yehuda Leib Walt and Reile Hamburg.

Liessin received a traditional Jewish education, but he developed heretical views that lead to his expulsion from the Volozhin Yeshiva. He then moved to Vilna, where he became involved in the revolutionary movement. In 1896, he was dissatisfied with the existing revolutionary organization and formed a new one called The Opposition. Hounded by the secret police, he fled Russia and moved to New York City in 1897. Before leaving, he established himself among the Russian Jewish workers and socialist leaders as a revolutionary Yiddish poet and social satirist. He was an active member of the Jewish Labor Bund, which was founded the year he left Russia. The Bund matched his beliefs of an economic and political socialism with a Jewish orientation. His first poems from that time were set to music and became favorites for political exiles in Russia. Because his writings and political activities made him wanted by the authorities, he began writing under the pseudonym A. Liessin.

Shortly after arriving in America, Liessin joined the Social Democratic faction that was opposed to Daniel De Leon's faction in the Socialist Labor Party. He was one of the first contributors for the Forverts (The Forward), writing poems, journalistic articles, and editorials. Under the name Dr. Ilks, he also led a campaign against De Leon's daily newspaper Dos Abend Blatt (The Evening Newspaper) and the Orthodox daily Yidishes tageblat (Jewish Daily News). His relationship with the Forverts began to cool when Abraham Cahan became its editor. He left the paper after Cahan rejected an anti-Zionist article he wrote, but after the socialist public protested he returned to the Forverts and Cahan published the article. When Cahan left the Forverts, Liessin helped Louis Miller edit the paper. When Miller left in 1902, he edited the paper with William Edlin. Following the Kishinev pogrom in 1903, he launched a campaign in support of the Bund. As a delegate of the seventh Bund congress in Lemberg in 1906, he demanded a positive stance on Jewish ethnic issues and supported "neutralism" on the nationality question. The Bund offered to publish a book of his essays, but after their editorial board rejected some of the essays for being too nationalistic he withdrew the book.

Seeking to articulate positive role models for revolution from Jewish tradition, Liessin wrote about Jewish religious and national figures like Judah Maccabee, Bar Kochba, Solomon Molcho, Rabbi Meir of Rothenburg, and Hirsh Lekert. His first collection of poems, Moderne Lider (Modern Poems), was illegally published in Minsk in 1897. In 1913, he began editing Di Tsukunft, a monthly Yiddish literary and cultural journal. He continued working as editor of the journal until his death. Shortly after he died, his collected works were published in a three-volume edition.

Liessin was active in the Workmen's Circle and the Socialist Party. In 1901, he married Libe Ginzburg, who was descended from a rabbinical family in Smarhonʹ and was forced to leave Russia for her involvement in the socialist movement. Her death in 1912 affected Liessin greatly. They had a daughter, Rokhl.

Liessin died at his home in the Bronx on November 5, 1938. He was buried in Mount Carmel Cemetery. A few days before his death from a heart attack, he collapsed while reading a poem at the funeral service of his friend and associate Baruch Charney Vladeck. His funeral was attended by 1,000 people crowded in Forward Hall, with another 5,000 gathered outside. Harry Rogoff presided over the funeral service, and speakers included Sholem Asch, David Pinski, Abraham Reisin, H. Leivick, Alexander Kahn, Nathan Chanin, Zivion, and Joseph Schlossberg. He was buried next to Vladeck in the Workmen's Circle section of the cemetery.
