= Pittet =

Pittet is a surname. Notable people with the surname include:

- Didier Pittet (born 1957), Swiss infectious diseases expert
- Mikael Pittet (born 1975), Swiss research scientist
