= Geneva model =

Geneva model may refer to:

- Presbyterian polity
- "Geneva Hand Hygiene Model", a hospital protocol pioneered by Didier Pittet
