= Harry Rogoff =

Russian-born American Jewish author and editor (1882–1971)

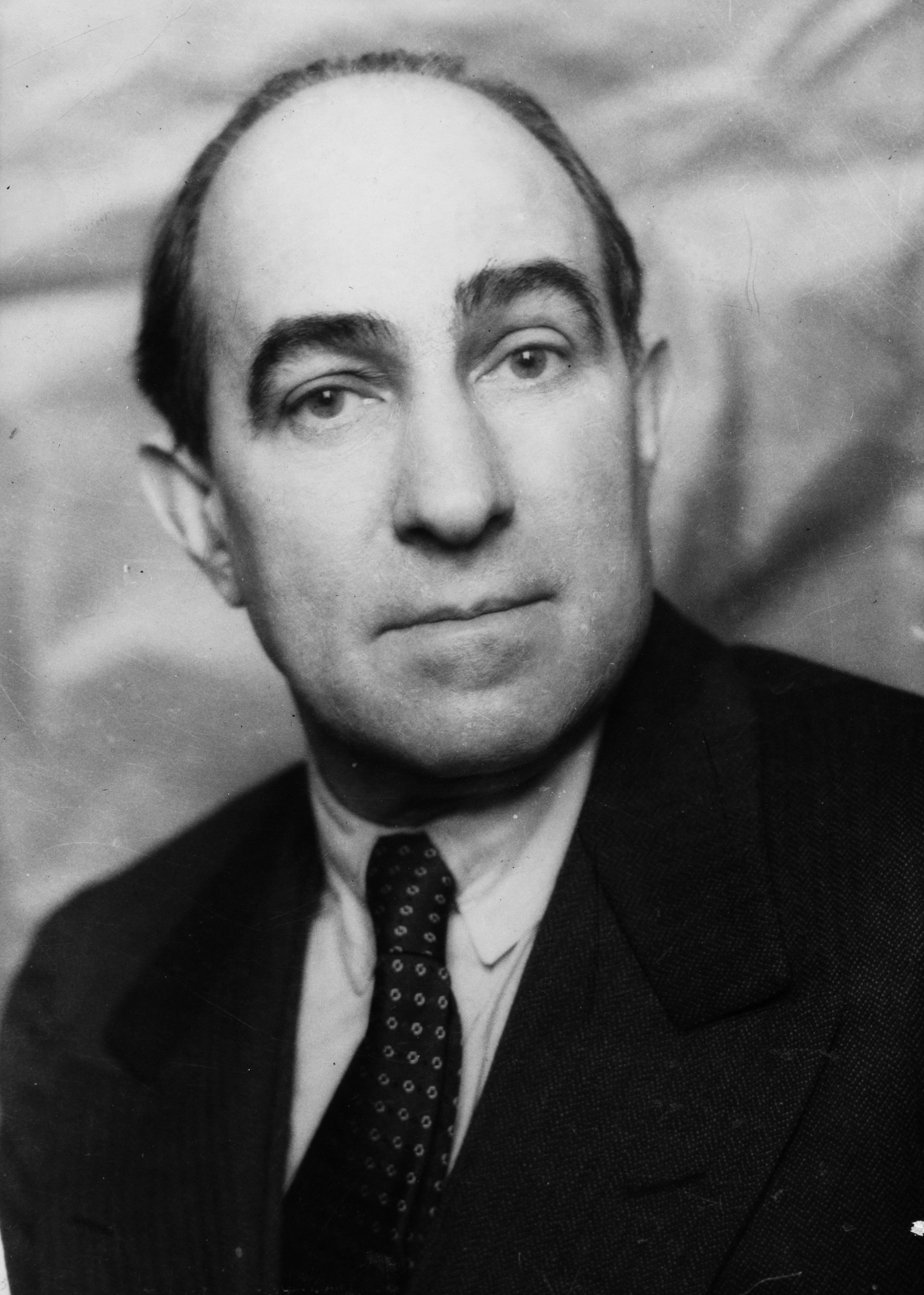
Rogoff c. 1930s

Harry "Hillel" Rogoff (December 11, 1882 – November 30, 1971) was a Belarusian-born Jewish-American journalist, author, and editor of The Forward.

== Life ==
Rogoff was born on December 11, 1882, in Berezino, Russian Empire, the son of Isaac Rogoff and Sarah Yachnowitz. He immigrated to America in 1890 and graduated from the College of the City of New York with a B.A. in 1906.

Rogoff attended the Rabbi Isaac Elchanan Theological Seminary. He began working as a journalist in English in 1905. A year later, he began writing in Yiddish for The Forward, remaining involved with the paper for the rest of his life outside of brief interruptions in 1908 and 1921. He wrote editorials, literary and theater criticisms, and pieces on social and political topics. He also published a number of travel narratives from Europe and Israel during the interwar period. He rose to become news editor and assistant editor of the paper, and in 1919 he became the managing editor. In 1951, he succeeded Abraham Cahan as editor-in-chief. He retired from the paper in 1962, although he continued to contribute to the paper afterwards. His last published piece was published a month before his death, discussing whether Arthur J. Goldberg wanted to leave the Supreme Court for the United Nations. He wrote a bimonthly book review in the Forward for many years.

Rogoff was also co-editor of Tsukunft (Future) at one point and as editor of Di yidishe arbayter-velt (The Jewish workers’ world) in Chicago in 1908. He worked with, among other papers, Fraye arbeter shtime (Free voice of labor), Di naye velt (The new world), the Labor Zionist daily newspaper Di tsayt (The times), and Der veker (The alarm). He was co-editor of Finf un zibetsik yor yidishe prese in amerike (Seventy-five years of the Yiddish press in America), published in 1945. His pen names included Yitskhok-Elkhonen and Ger Toshav. His reporting on workers in the garment industry lead to the establishment of a new union led by Sidney Hillman and Joseph Schlossberg. From 1915 to 1916, he edited the literary magazine East and West, one of the earliest attempts to introduce Yiddish literature to American readers. He was an early dove on the Vietnam War, urging an end to the bombing of North Vietnam in 1967. He already stepped down as editor of the Forward at the time, with the paper's editorial policy generally supportive of President Johnson's foreign policy. He also supported the 1970 election of Senator Charles Goodell, while the paper backed Representative Richard Ottinger.

Pamphlet promoting Rogoff's 1918 State Assembly candidacy, sponsored by the Amalgamated Clothing Workers of America

Rogoff was the Socialist candidate for the New York State Assembly in Kings County 14th District in 1918 (losing to Democrat Joseph Lentol) and 1919 (losing again to Lentol). In 1920, he was the Socialist candidate for the New York State Senate in New York's 11th State Senate district (part of Kings County), losing to Republican Abraham L. Katlin. In the 1926 United States House of Representatives election, he was the Socialist candidate in New York's 12th congressional district. He lost the election to Samuel Dickstein.

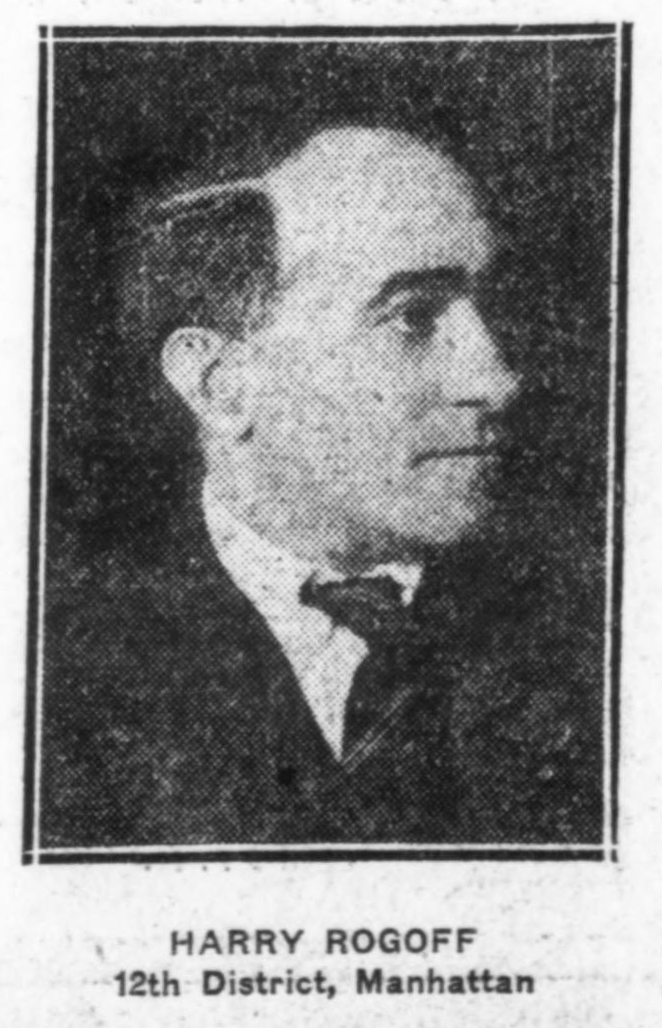
Rogoff as a candidate for Congress, 1926

Rogoff published several books in Yiddish, including Vi azoy amerika vert regiert (How America is ruled) in 1918, the five-volume Di geshikhte fun di fareynigte shtaten (The history of the United States) between 1925 and 1928, Meyer london, a byografye (Meyer London, a biography) in 1930 (which was published in English that year as An East Side Epic), and Der gayst fun “forverts” (The spirit of the Forward) in 1954. He also wrote several political pamphlets, including Finf un tsavtsik yor komunistishe bavegung in amerike (Twenty-five years of the Communist movement in America), Amerikaner frayhayt (American freedom) in 1916, Di diktatur fun proletariat (The dictatorship of the proletariat) in 1920, Huver, smit un zeyere platformes (Hoover, Smith and their platforms) in 1928, Der kongres fun di fareynigte shtaten (The Congress of the United States) in 1930, Di politishe lage in amerike un di oyfgaben fun der sotsyalistisher bavegung (The political state of affairs in America and the tasks of the socialist movement) in 1938, and Vikhtike problemen fun der arbeter-bavegung (Important issues in the labor movement) with L. Hendin and Nathan Chanin in 1940. He translated Morris Hilquist’s The History of the Socialist Movement in the United States into the Yiddish Di geshikhte fun der sotsyalistisher bavegung in di fareynigte shtaten in 1919. He also wrote Nine Yiddish Writers in 1915. He was a member of the Congress for Jewish Culture.

In 1916, Rogoff married Anna Kovaler. Their children were Julian and Phoebe.

Rogoff died at 258 Riverside Drive on November 30, 1971. He was buried in Mount Carmel Cemetery.
