= Khalopyenichy =

Khalopyenichy Халопенічы (Belarusian)
- Urban-type settlement
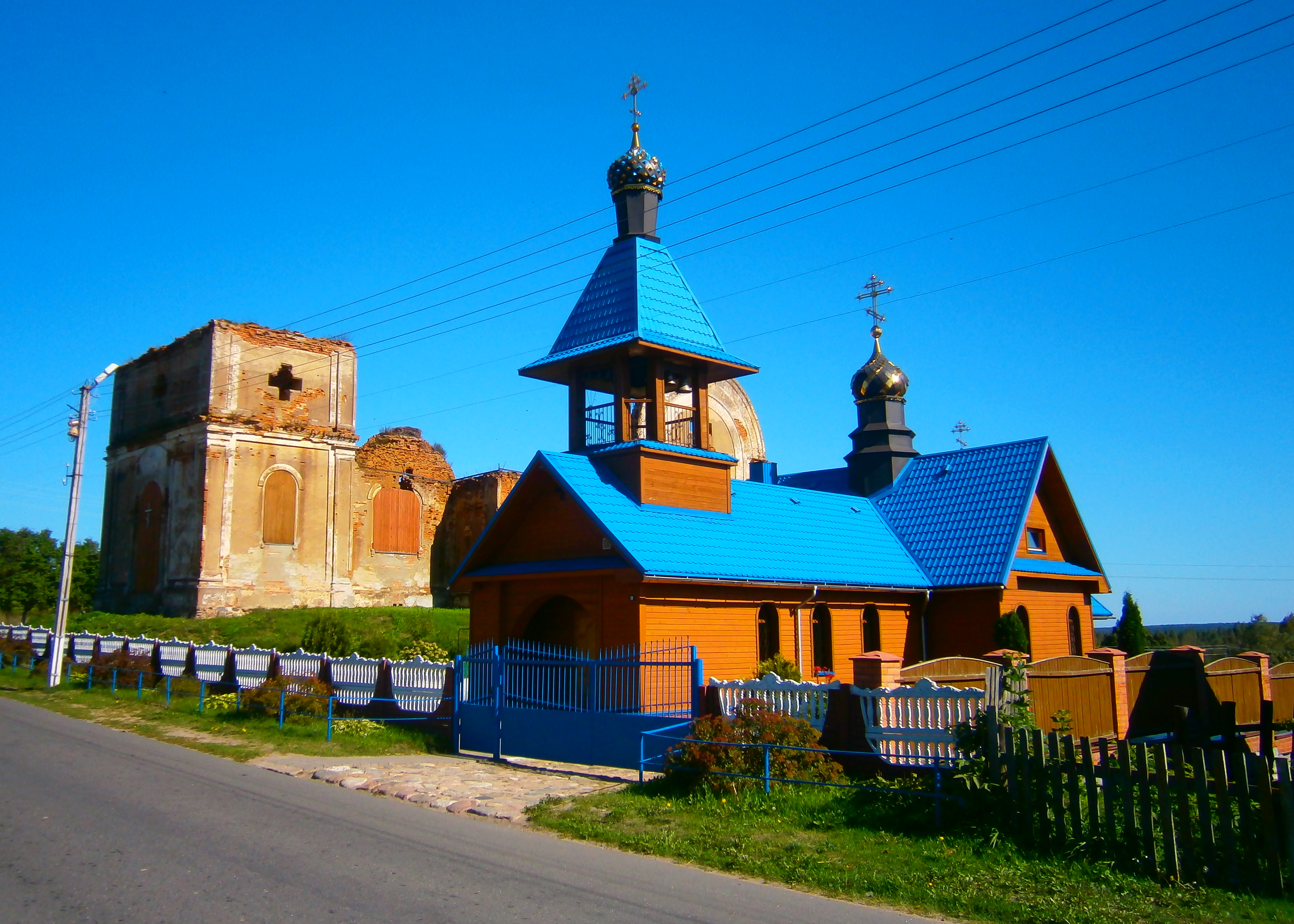

- Location within Belarus
- Coordinates: 54°31′00″N 28°58′00″E
- Country: Belarus
- Region: Minsk Region
- District: Krupki District

Population (2026)
  - Total: 1,293
- Time zone: UTC+3 (MSK)

Khalopyenichy (Note: Belarusian: Халопенічы, romanized: Chalopieničy; Russian: Холопеничи, romanized: Kholopenichi; Lithuanian: Cholopeničiai.) is an urban-type settlement in Krupki District, Minsk Region, Belarus. As of 2026, it has a population of 1,293.

== History ==
First mentioned in 1451, Khalopyenichy belonged to Vitebsk Voivodeship of the Grand Duchy of Lithuania (from 1569, the Polish–Lithuanian Commonwealth), and later to Minsk Governorate of the Russian Empire.

== Notable people ==
- Adam Bahdanovič (1862–1940), Belarusian ethnographer. Many of the folk tales and customs he recorded come from Khalopyenichy, and in particular from his maternal grandmother, the local storyteller Ruzala Aśmak.
- Nathan Chanin (1885–1965), Belarusian-American labor organizer. He was an activist in the Jewish Labor Bund, and later served as the general secretary of The Workmen's Circle from 1952 to 1963.
