= Mount Carmel Cemetery (Queens) =

Cemetery in Queens, New York

Coordinates: 40.6991692°N 73.8893293°W

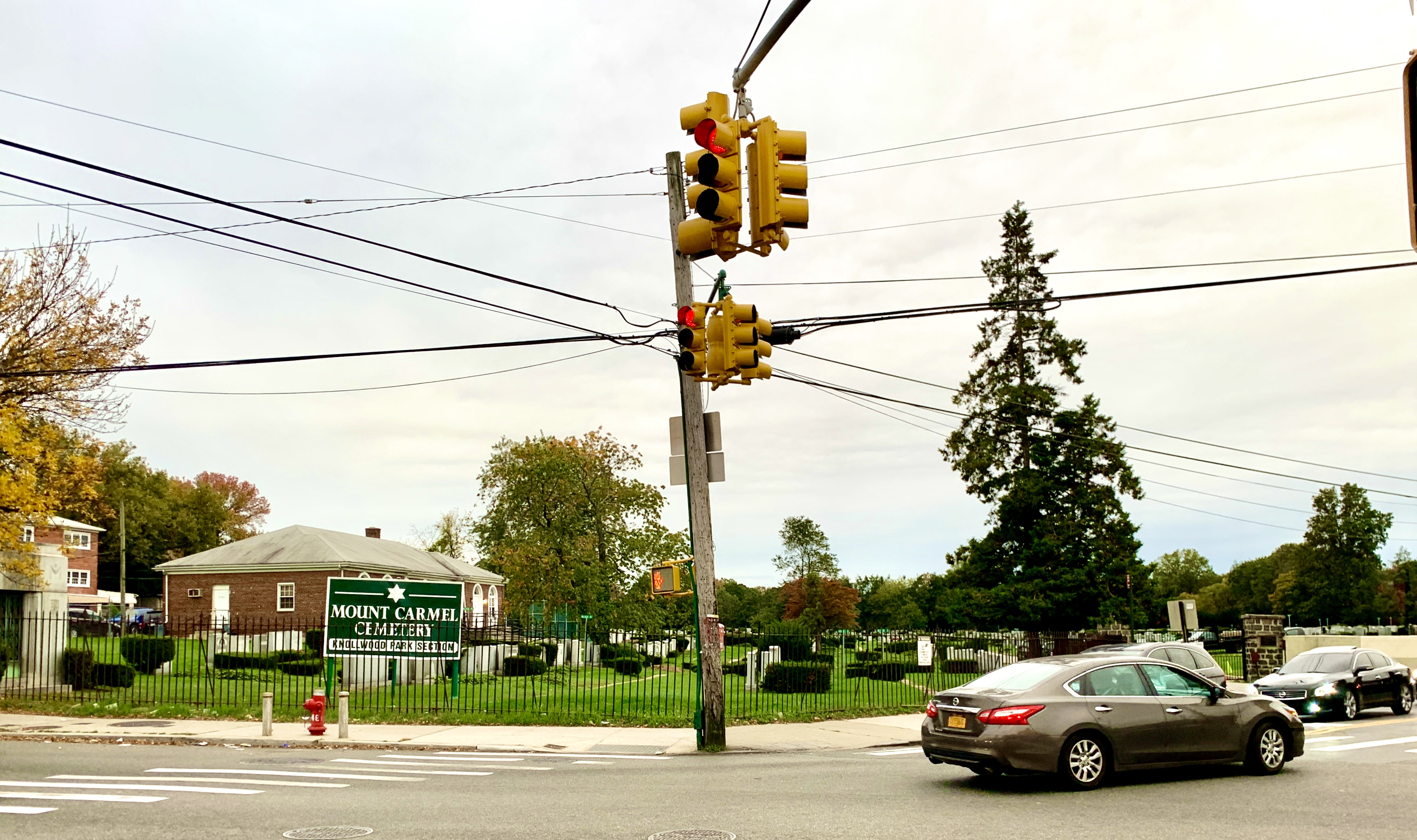
Mount Carmel Cemetery

Mount Carmel Cemetery is a Jewish cemetery located within the Cemetery Belt in Queens, New York City that opened in 1906. The main section is in Glendale, Queens, and has more than 85,000 occupied plots. A new section was opened in nearby Ridgewood. It was built as part of the Rural Cemetery Act, a New York City ban on new Manhattan cemeteries effective 1850, which led to the opening of new ones in Brooklyn and Queens that form an area collectively called the Cemetery Belt. The original plot of The Workers Circle is located in the cemetery, including the Honor Row, where many of the most prominent figures of Jewish life in New York City and Eastern Europe were buried.

== Famous burials ==
- Bella Abzug
- Jacob Adler
- Sholem Aleichem
- Joseph Baskin
- Mendel Beilis
- Benjamin J. Bialostotzky
- Jeanette Goodman Brill
- Abraham Cahan
- Roger C. Carmel
- Erwin Chargaff
- Betty Comden
- Hasye Cooperman
- William Edlin
- Benjamin Feigenbaum
- Morris Feinstone
- Leo Frank
- Israel Freedman
- Saul Ginsburg
- Iser Ginzburg
- Bernard Goldstein (Bundist)
- B. Gorin
- Lazarus Joseph (1891–1966), NY State Senator and New York City Comptroller
- Alexander Kahn
- Leon Kamaiky
- Meyer Kanewsky
- Philip Krantz
- Harry E. Lewis
- Aaron Liebermann
- Abraham Liessin
- Meyer London
- A. Lutzky
- Anna Margolin
- Minnie Marx, mother of The Marx Brothers
- Sam Marx, father of The Marx Brothers
- Zvi Hirsch Masliansky
- Vladimir Medem
- John Mill (Bundist)
- N. B. Minkoff
- Jonathan Oppenheim
- Max Pine
- Abe Reles
- Bernard Revel
- Morris Rosenfeld
- Harry Rogoff
- Nelson Ruttenberg
- Benjamin Schlesinger
- Abraham I. Shiplacoff
- Bennett E. Siegelstein
- Israel Joshua Singer
- George Tobias
- Mordecai Waxman
- Morris Winchevsky
- Saul Yanovsky
- Henny Youngman
- Szmul Zygielbojm
- Jean de Koven
- Benjamin Abrams
