= Collège Calvin =

Coordinates: 46°12′03″N 6°09′02″E

Location
- Rue Théodore-de-Bèze, 2-4; Geneva 1211; Switzerland

Information
- Type: Matura School
- Established: 1559; 467 years ago
- Director: Nicolas Levet
- Staff: approx. 100
- Grades: 1st-4th
- Enrollment: approx. 800
- Language: French

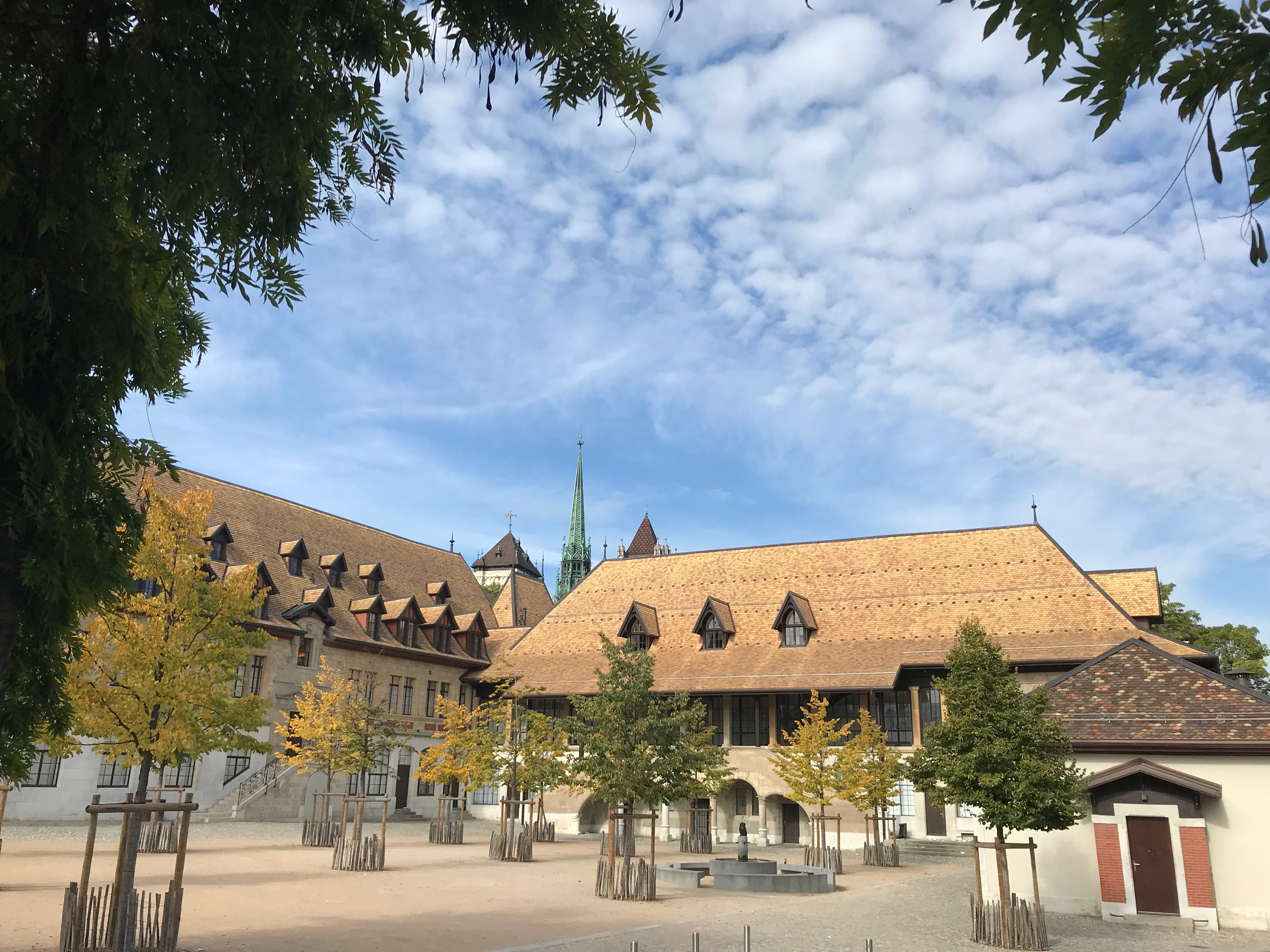
The Collège Calvin in 2017

The Collège Calvin, formerly the Collège de Genève, is the oldest public secondary school in Geneva, Switzerland. It was founded in 1559 by John Calvin.

== History ==
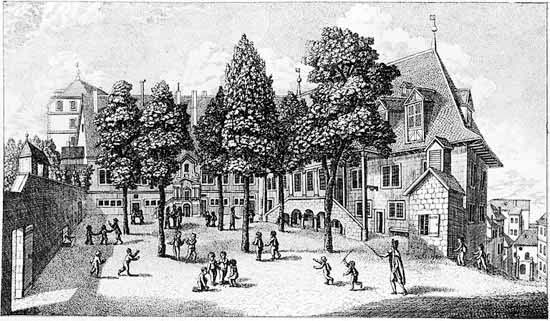
A 19th century engraving of the Collège Calvin.

On February 24, 1428, the Conseil Général of Geneva decided to establish a college in Rive, near the Franciscan convent, and near the Place du Molard. In it was taught the liberal arts and university studies, which Genevan people had previously had to go abroad to study. After the Protestant Reformation, school was made obligatory and free for poor people on May 21, 1536. A new college was founded, this time in the Franciscan convent.

It was not until May 29, 1559, after the Leges Academiae Genevensis (Order of Collège de Genève) that work began on the actual building of a new official Collège de Genève and Université de Genève. This building would eventually house the Collège de Genève alone. The original edifice is now part of a complex, with a wing added in the Renaissance, another wing and building in the 19th century, and a final building added in 1987. The Collège de Genève was renamed the Collège Calvin in 1969, after its founder, the French Protestant reformer John Calvin.

== System ==
The Collège Calvin is one of the Postobligatory Secondary Education Schools in Geneva, specifically under the Formation Gymnasiale collèges. Students who want to pursue an education past the (obligatory) Cycle d'Orientation enter the four-year college from 15 to 19.

== Notable alumni ==
- Joseph Baskin
- Marc Bonnant
- Jorge Luis Borges
- Louis Dumur: Les trois demoiselles du père Maire, Le centenaire de Jean Jacques, L'école du dimanche
- Henry Dunant
- Barbara Hofmann
- Philippe Monnier: Le livre de Blaise
- Gustave Moynier
- Marcel Junod
- Didier Pittet
- Jan A. Rajchman (1911-1989)
- Ferdinand de Saussure (1857-1913)
- Jean Starobinski
- Rodolphe Töpffer (1799-1846)
- Andrew Le Mercier (1692-1764)
- Augustin Pyramus de Candolle (1778-1841)
