= A. Lutzky =

American poet

Aaron Zucker (May 15, 1892 – September 13, 1957), better known by his pen name A. Lutzky, was a Ukrainian-born Jewish American Yiddish poet.

== Life ==
Lutzky was born on May 15, 1892 in Demydivka, Volhynian Governorate, the son of a bookkeeper.

When Lutzky was twelve, he left the cheder to study under a cantor in Lutsk. His Hassidic father disapproved of his son becoming a cantor and sent him to a Yeshiva. Under his mother's influence, he also learned how to play the violin. He began writing poems when he was fourteen, and they won praise from I. L. Peretz. He immigrated to America following his father's death in 1914, but not before visiting Peretz in Warsaw. During the visit, Peretz unsuccessfully tried to convince Lutzky to stay in Warsaw. Lutzky initially worked as a peddler, teacher, and violinist in America. He published his first poems in the Yidishes Tageblat and Der Tog in 1917. The Forward editor Abraham Cahan recognized Lutzky's talent, had him write a weekly poem for The Forward, and gave him the pseudonym "Lutzky" for his birthplace.

A year later, Lutzky served with the American Expeditionary Forces in France for World War I and fought in the trenches of Verdun. When he returned from his military service, he began writing in a new style that needed to be read aloud to be fully grasped. His first volume of poems, Nemt Es! S'is Gut Far Aykh! (Take It! It's Good for You!), was published in 1927. This was followed by Bereshis-Inmitten (The Beginning is the Middle) in 1932, Portretn (Portraits) in 1945, and A Bukh Tsum Lebn (A Book for Life) in 1948. He did dramatic impersonations of his poems, acting out through his face and body what his words hinted at. The impersonations were imitated by leading actors and entertainers and entered into the lasting Yiddish repertoire.

Lutzky was a member of the editorial staff of the Jewish Day-Morning Journal. His work appeared in a number of periodicals, including Fraye Arbeter Shtime, Tsukunft, Yidisher Kemfer, and Di Goldene Keyt. Some of his lyrics were translated to Hebrew and English. A fifth volume of his poetry, Fun Aldos Guts (Of All Good Things), was posthumously published in 1958 and included a bibliography.

Lutzky died from a heart attack on September 13, 1957. He was buried in the Workmen's Circle section of Mount Carmel Cemetery.
