= Bennett E. Siegelstein =

American politician

Bennett Edward Siegelstein (December 25, 1880 – October 26, 1974) was a Romanian-born Jewish-American lawyer and politician from New York.

== Life ==
Siegelstein was born on December 25, 1880, in Iaşi, Romania, the son of Paul and Clara Siegelstein.

Siegelstein immigrated to America with his family in 1885 and attended elementary school there. Seeking to help his family, he secured a job in the office of Daniel & Sons after school at an early age. After finishing public school, he entered the City College of New York and supported himself with clerical work for the Cooper Union Institute. He graduated from City College in 1897, after which he entered the New York University School of Law. He graduated from there in 1900. In December of that year, following his 21st birthday, he was admitted to the bar, opened a law office in 99 Nassau Street, and began practicing law in New York City.

Siegelstein was a general committee member of Tammany Hall by 1904. In 1903, he was elected to the New York State Assembly as a Democrat, representing the New York County 8th District. He served in the Assembly in 1904. The youngest sitting member of the Assembly, he successfully passed bills that reduced the charge for telephone calls from 10 cents per call to 7 cents, reduced the charge of gas from one dollar per thousand cubic feet to 80 cents, prohibited making explosives in tenement or apartment houses. He also tried to reduce the charge of gas to 75 cents and introduced bills that made it optional for juries in murder cases to sentence prisoners to death or prison for life. He lost the 1904 re-election for the Assembly to Republican Louis Freidel.

Siegelstein was a delegate of the 1924 American Bar Association Convention in London. He was president of the United Roumanian Jews of America and Canada. He originated and advocated an increase in judges' salaries and promotions as well as elevating them as they did in England. He was president of the Progress Society and the YMHA. He was also an organizer and/or officer of the Jewish Center of East Side, the Federation of Jewish Charities, the Jewish Publication Society, the Jewish Theatrical Guild, the Grand Street Boys Association, and the Jewish Educational Organization.

Siegelstein was chairman of the Insurance Investigation Bureau of Queens County, adjusting claims of widows for federal compensation. He was the founder, counsel, and trustee of the Menorah Home for the Aged and Infirm. He was a delegate to the American Jewish Congress, a trustee of the Society for the Advancement of Judaism, an executive director and trustee of the Children's Welfare Board, and a member of the American Jewish Committee and the Big Brothers and Big Sisters Society.

Siegelstein was a Freemason, a Shriner, a governor of the Progress Club, and a member of the American Bar Association and the New York State Bar Association. He was the first president of the First Roumanian-American Synagogue. In 1904, he married Fannie Lukatcher in that synagogue. Their children were Miriam, Jack and Fred. Fred changed his name to Fred Sparks, worked as a journalist, and won the 1951 Pulitzer Prize for International Reporting for his dispatches on the Korean War.

Siegelstein died in Miami Beach, Florida, where he was living, on October 26, 1974. He was buried in Mount Carmel Cemetery.

New York State Assembly
Preceded by Isidor Cohn	New York State Assembly; New York County, 8th District; 1904	Succeeded by Louis Freidel
