= Pumpėnai =

- Town
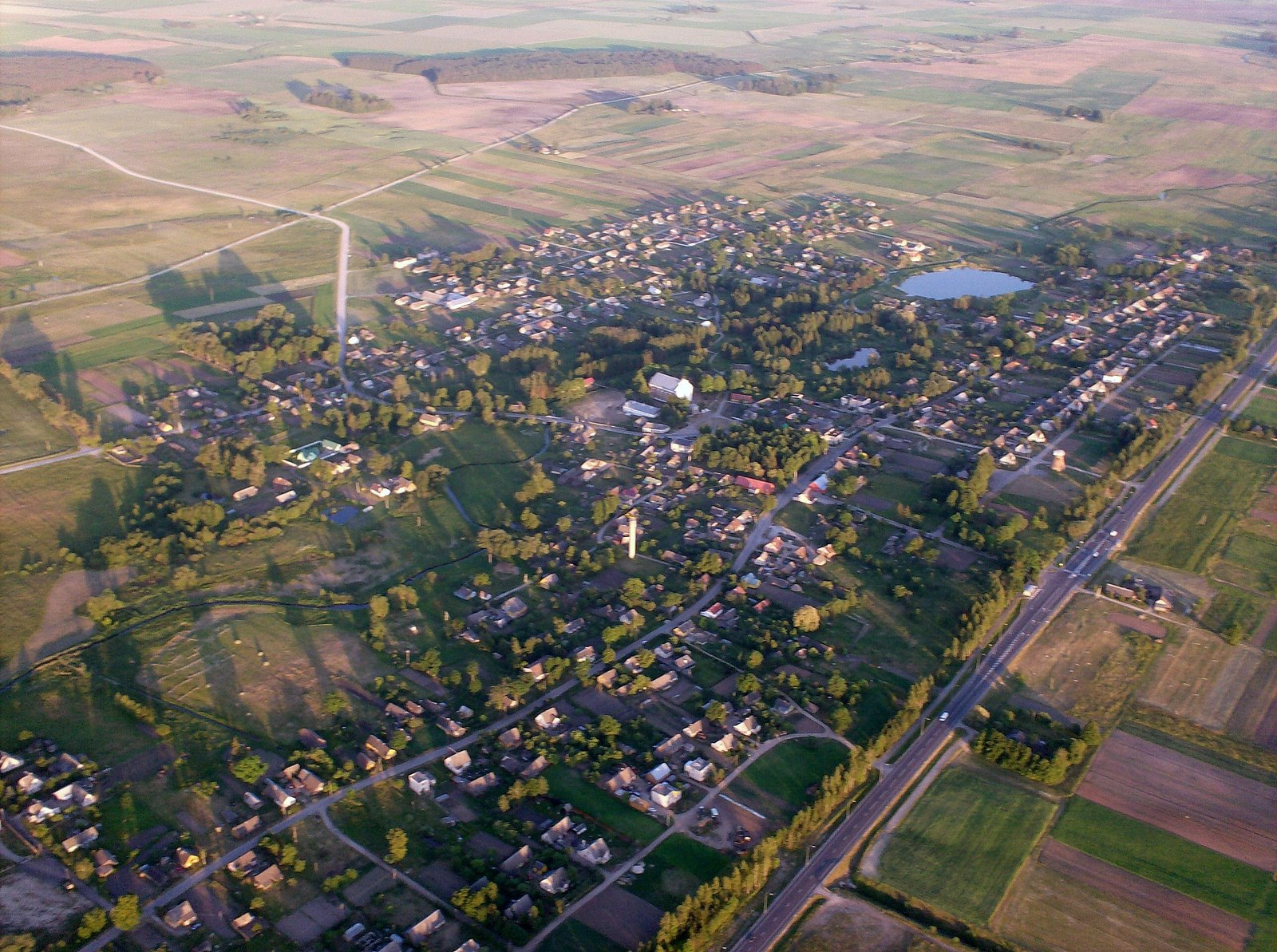

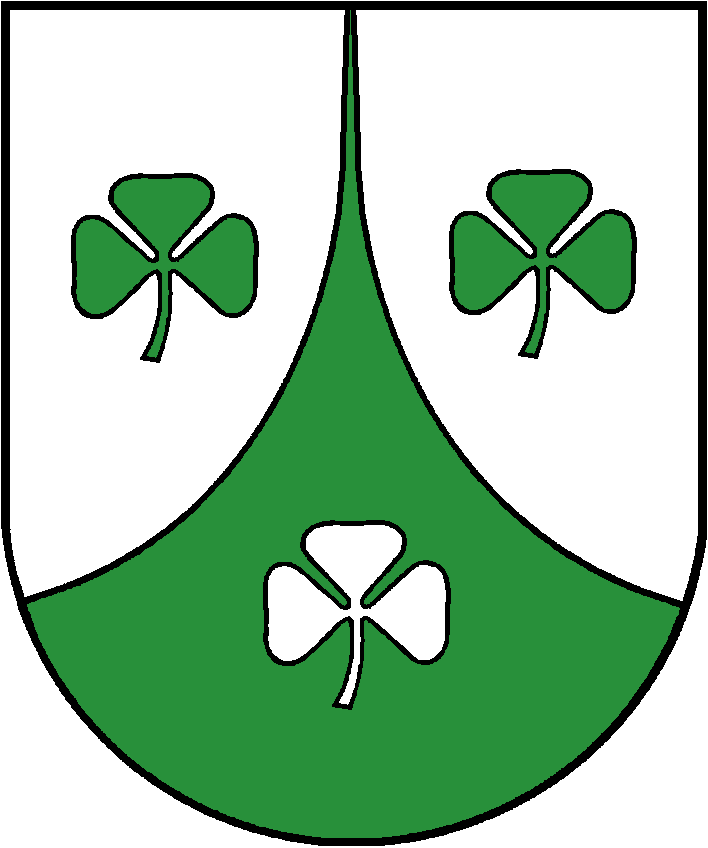
- Coat of arms

- Location within Lithuania
- Coordinates: 55°56′00″N 24°20′30″E
- Country: Lithuania
- County: Panevėžys County

Population (2011)
  - Total: 855
- Time zone: UTC+2 (EET)
  - Summer (DST): UTC+3 (EEST)

Pumpėnai is a small town in Panevėžys County, in northeastern Lithuania. According to the 2011 census, the town has a population of 855 people.

== History ==
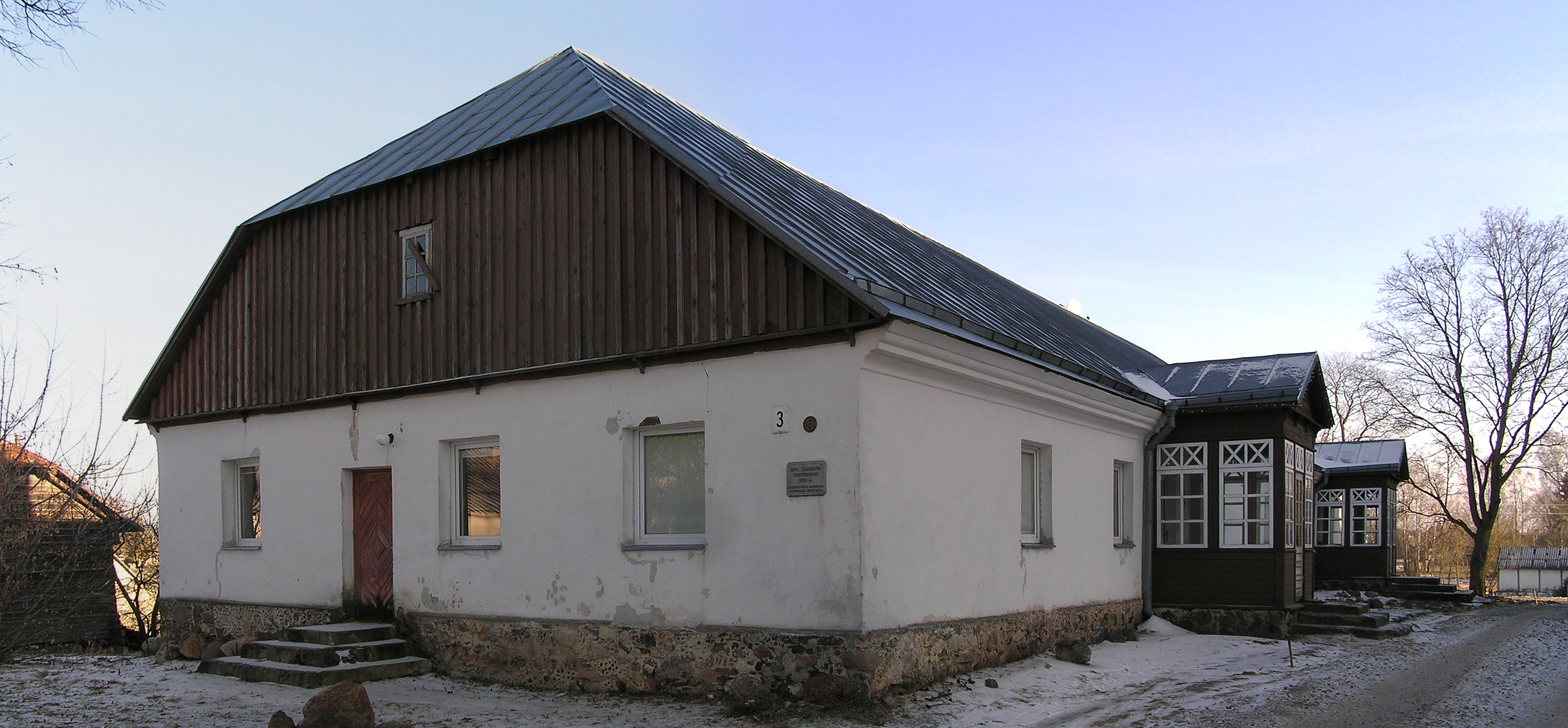
Building of Carmelites monastery

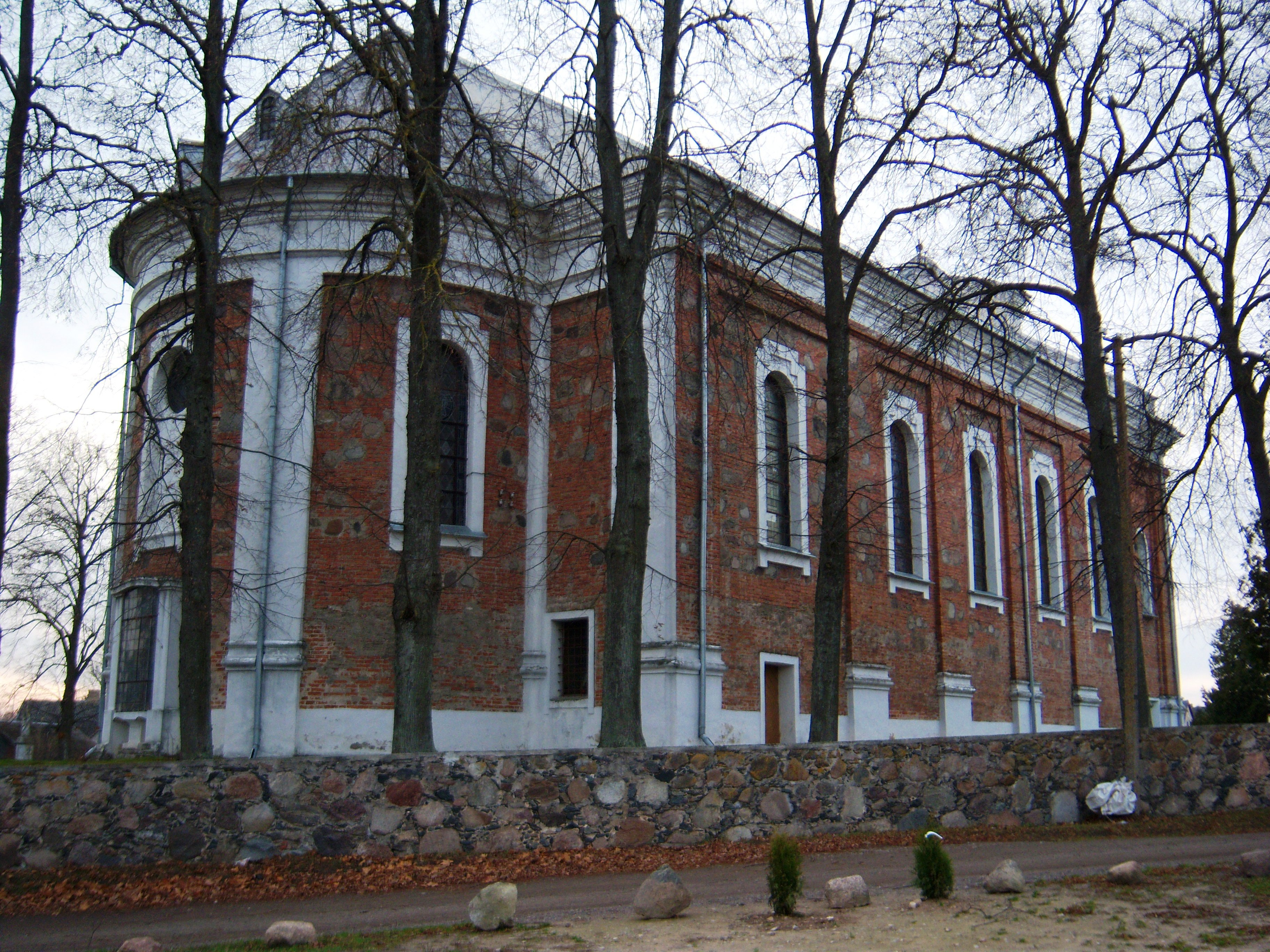
Church of Pumpėnai

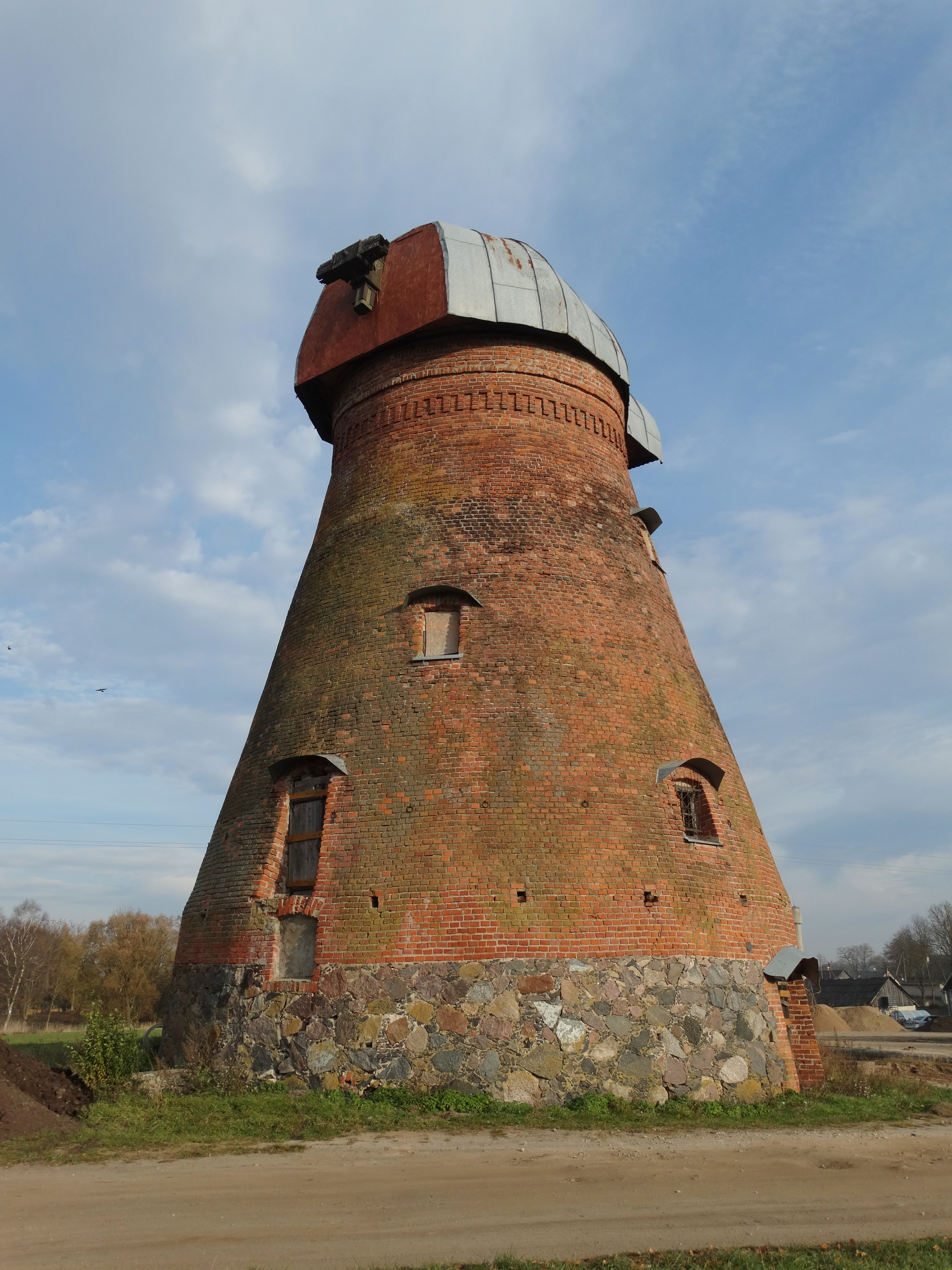
Windmill of Pumpėnai

The first church in Pumpėnai was built around 1638. The town established itself due to the settlement of monks from the Order of Carmelites in 17th century. The monastery was built by Povilas and Jurgis Zavadskis and Juozapas Šyšla in 1655. The monastery was built from wood and burned down in 1770 and then was rebuilt. In 1792 Pumpėnai got Magdeburg rights.

On 15 July 1941, Jews of the town were kept imprisoned in a ghetto. On August 26, 1941, an execution squad murdered the Jews in a mass execution.

Soviet occupants in 1946–1953 deported about 500 people from the Pumpėnai area. After the Soviet occupation in the surroundings of Pumpėnai Lithuanian partisans of Algimantas military district were active, namely the Žaliosios brigade.

== Notable people ==
- Felicijonas Lelis (1870–1949), a priest
- Benjamin J. Bialostotzky (1893–1962), Yiddish poet
- Aleksandras Balčiauskas (1907–1952), a Protestant priest
- Česlovas Kavaliauskas (1923–1997), a priest, theologician, poet, translator of the Bible
- Petras Abukevičius (1928–1997), film director, operator
