= Iser Ginzburg =

Lithuanian-born Jewish-American physician and Yiddish journalist

Iser Ginzburg (October 28, 1872 – October 12, 1947) was a Lithuanian-born Jewish-American physician and Yiddish journalist.

== Life ==
Ginzburg was born on October 28, 1872, in Deltuva, Kovno Governorate, Russia, the son of Faive Ginzburg and Sadie Cohen.

Ginzburg studied in yeshivas in Vilkomir and Vilna. He lived in the latter city when he was thirteen and began studying the Haskalah there. He then became a Hebrew and Jewish history teacher for a group of youngsters who called themselves Ohave Yerushalaim (Lovers of Jerusalem) and left the yeshiva. When he was sixteen, he met a group of Jewish socialists, including Mendl Rozenboym, Arkadi Kremer, and Yudin-Ayzenshtadt, and began to acquire a general education. He also began writing for Ha-Melitz while young. He initially made plans to move to Breslau, Germany and study to be a rabbi there, but in 1893 he moved to America instead.

Ginzburg began attending the Cornell University Medical College in 1896 and received an MD from there in 1900. He became a practicing physician afterwards, although he maintained a literary and journalistic career. He was a staff member for The Forward, writing for them under the pseudonym Der Stechiger (The Satiric One), and contributed reviews on books related to Jewish philosophy, religion, and history for the Yiddish monthly Zukunft. He also wrote for other Yiddish papers like Fraye Arbeter Shtime and Hebrew papers like Hatoren and Hadoar. He wrote, among other books, Der Talmud, Zayn Antshteyung un Antviklung (The Talmud, Its Origins and Development) in 1910, Di Antshteyung fun Kristntum (The Origin of Christianity) in 1917, the two-volume Yidishe Denker un Poeten in Mitlelter (Jewish Thinkers and Poets in the Middle Ages) from 1918 to 1919, and Maimonides in 1935. He once carried on a sharp polemic with Chaim Zhitlowsky over the issue of Judaism and Christianity, and in 1910 it was published in Dos Naye Lebn under the title "Tsu der Tseylem-Frage" (On the Issue of the Cross).

Ginzburg was a member of the American Medical Association and the American Association for the Advancement of Science. In 1897, he married Rose Pery, daughter of Jacob Pery, in Bayonne, New Jersey. Their son was Dr. Leon Ginzburg.

Ginzburg died at Mount Sinai Hospital from a long illness. He was buried in the Workmen's Circle section of Mount Carmel Cemetery.
