= Adam Bahdanovič =

Belarusian ethnographer

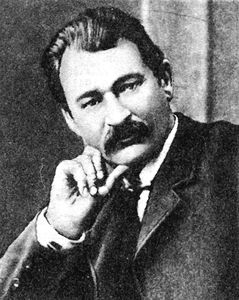

Adam Bahdanovič (Belarusian: Адам Ягоравіч Багдановіч; Russian: Адам Егорович Богданович; March 25, 1862, Chalopieničy – April 16, 1940, Yaroslavl) was a Belarusian ethnographer and collector of folklore. Born in a peasant family, he graduated from a pedagogical college in Nyasvizh in 1882 and worked as a school teacher in Minsk and, later, as a bank clerk in Hrodna. While still in college, Bahdanovič started recording folk tales, songs, and customs, first for the folklorist Pavel Shejn, and eventually as an independent researcher. His work influenced his son, the poet Maksim Bahdanovič, who frequently turned to folk fairy stories for inspiration. Adam Bahdanovič was a longtime friend of Maksim Gorki, and wrote several memoir pieces about him. Bahdanovič's personal library is now a part of the library of Belarusian Academy of Sciences
