= Mikael Pittet =

Swiss research scientist

Mikaël Pittet
- Mikaël Pittet
- Born: May 23, 1975 (age 51); Lausanne, Switzerland
- Education: University of Lausanne (PhD)
- Scientific career
- Fields: Immunology, Cancer Immunotherapy
- Workplaces: University of Geneva; Geneva University Hospitals; Ludwig Institute for Cancer Research; Swiss Institute for Experimental Cancer Research; Harvard Medical School
- Doctoral advisor: Jean-Charles Cerottini
- Website: Lab webpage

Mikaël Pittet (born May 23, 1975) is a Swiss immunologist whose research focuses on cancer immunology. He is a professor at the University of Geneva (UNIGE), and holder of the ISREC Foundation Chair in immuno-oncology. He is also a full member of the Lausanne Branch of the Ludwig Institute for Cancer Research.

== Education ==
Mikaël Pittet completed his PhD thesis in Immunology at the Ludwig Institute for Cancer Research and graduated from University of Lausanne (Switzerland) in 2001. He subsequently moved to Boston, where he pursued postdoctoral research at Massachusetts General Hospital (MGH), Harvard Medical School (HMS) and Dana–Farber Cancer Institute (DFCI).

== Career ==
Pittet became assistant professor at HMS in 2006, Associate Professor in 2013, and Full Professor in 2019 (Department of radiology). He was appointed Director of the Cancer immunology program at the center for systems biology in 2016. He was also a member of the Dana-Farber/Harvard Cancer Center and Immunology Program at Harvard Medical School.

He joined the University of Geneva (Switzerland) in 2020 as a Full Professor of Immunology, and holds the ISREC Foundation Chair in immuno-oncology. He was appointed a full Member of the Ludwig Institute in 2021. Pittet also leads the Translational Research Center in Oncohaematology (CRTOH) at the University of Geneva since 2022 and is a member of the center for inflammation research. He is equally a member of the Department of oncology of the Geneva University Hospitals.

The Pittet Lab is located in Lausanne (Switzerland) in the AGORA cancer research center, which brings together interdisciplinary research groups of the Swiss Cancer Center Léman (SCCL) Léman (SCCL) working to accelerate the transfer of cancer research into the clinic.

Mikaël Pittet serves on the editorial board of the journals Cell Stress and Cancer Immunology Research.

== Research ==
Pittet is a widely cited researcher in cancer immunology and cancer immunotherapy, especially in the fields of innate and adaptive immunity, and the roles of myeloid cells in cancer. His research focuses on uncovering how the immune system controls cancer and other diseases and how it can be harnessed for therapy. He is known for utilizing molecular imaging to track immune cells and drugs directly in vivo. Pittet's work has identified how cancers are regulated by various immune cells, including cytotoxic T cells, regulatory T cells, macrophages, monocytes, neutrophils, and dendritic cells. These cells are important regulators of the tumor microenvironment and potential targets for cancer immunotherapy.

== Awards and honors ==
Pittet's work has been honored with the 2015 Samana Cay MGH Research Scholarship Award, the 2016 Robert Wenner Award, the 2016 Distinguished Investigator Award from the Academy of Radiology Research, and the 2017 MGH Mentoring Award. He also received an Honorary Master of Arts Degree from Harvard University in 2019 and is recognized as a Highly Cited Researcher based on his multiple papers that rank in the top 1% by citations across fields and during the last decade.

== Selected publications ==
- Swirski FK, Nahrendorf M, Etzrodt M, Wildgruber M, Cortez-Retamozo V, Panizzi P, Figueiredo JL, Kohler RH, Chudnovskiy A, Waterman P, Aikawa E, Mempel TR, Libby P, Weissleder R, Pittet MJ (2009). "Identification of Splenic Reservoir Monocytes and Their Deployment to Inflammatory Sites". Science. 325 (5940): 612–6. Bibcode:2009Sci...325..612S. doi:10.1126/science.1175202. PMC 2803111. PMID 19644120.
- Garris CS, Arlauckas SP, Kohler RH, Trefny MP, Garren S, Piot C, Engblom C, Pfirschke C, Siwicki M, Gungabeesoon J, Freeman GJ, Warren SE, Ong S, Browning E, Twitty CG, Pierce RH, Le MH, Algazi AP, Daud AI, Pai SI, Zippelius A, Weissleder R, Pittet MJ (2018). "Successful Anti-PD-1 Cancer Immunotherapy Requires T Cell-Dendritic Cell Crosstalk Involving the Cytokines IFN-γ and IL-12". Immunity. 49 (6): 1–14. doi:10.1016/j.immuni.2018.09.024. PMC 6301092. PMID 30552023.
- Bill R, Wirapati P, Messemaker M, Roh W, Zitti B, Duval F, Kiss M, Park JC, Saal TM, Hoelzl J, Tarussio D, Benedetti F, Tissot S, Kandalaft L, Varrone M, Ciriello G, McKee TA, Monnier Y, Mermod M, Blaum EM, Gushterova I, Gonye AL, Hacohen N, Getz G, Mempel TR, Klein AM, Weissleder R, Faquin WC, Sadow PM, Lin D, Pai SI, Sade-Feldman M, Pittet MJ (2023). "CXCL9 macrophage polarity identifies a network of cellular programs that control human cancers". Science. 381 (6657): 515–524. doi:10.1126/science.ade2292. PMID 37535729.
