= Di Tsayt (New York City) =

Newspaper in New York City, New York

Di Tsayt די צײט
- Type: Daily
- Editor: David Pinski
- Founded: August 29, 1920
- Ceased publication: April 26, 1922
- Political alignment: Labor Zionist
- Language: Yiddish
- Headquarters: New York City
- OCLC number: 32750086

Di Tsayt (Yiddish: די צײט, 'The Time', also transliterated in the Germanized fashion as Die Zeit) was a Yiddish language daily newspaper published in New York City, United States 1920-1922. Di Tsayt was a national organ of the Labor Zionist Poale Zion movement in the United States. It was published by the Poale Zion Publishing Association. The playwright David Pinski was the editor of Di Tsayt.

== Founding ==
Di Tsayt was founded on the initiative of Nachman Syrkin and other champions of the Poale Zion. To launch a daily newspaper of its own was quite an undertaking for the Poale Zion movement. Shares were sold amongst sympathizers in different areas of the United States. Golda Meir participated in the campaign to sell shares for the founding of Di Tsayt.

== Profile ==
The first issue of Di Tsayt was published on August 29, 1920. The newspaper was published parallel to the existing Poale Zion weekly, Der Yiddisher Kempfer. Whilst Der Yiddisher Kempfer retained the role as the ideological-political organ of the movement, Di Tsayt focused more on issues of nurturing Jewish culture.

== Closure ==
The publication attracted a number of talented Yiddish writers, but could not position itself in the competition with the main established Yiddish newspapers of the city. The newspaper suffered from financial difficulties for some time. In the end the newspaper went bankrupt. The publication was closed down on April 26, 1922. The closure of Di Tsayt resulted in a significant loss of prestige and demoralized the Poale Zion movement in the United States.
