= Mikhl Gelbart =

American singer

Mikhl Gelbart (August 21, 1889 – December 20, 1962) was an American composer of Yiddish songs. He was born in Ozorków, Poland. His music reflected a very American Yiddish motif, and was integral to the curricula of the Arbeter Ring (Workmen's Circle) schools and camps.

He died in New York of bone cancer.
