= Nathan Chanin =

American labor organizer

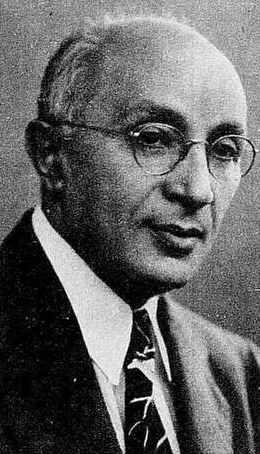
Chanin c. 1948

Nathan Chanin (December 6, 1885 – August 8, 1965) was a Belarusian-American labor activist. He served as the general secretary of The Workmen's Circle from 1952 to 1963.

== Biography ==
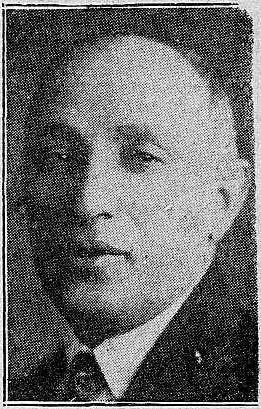
Chanin c. 1933

Chanin was born in Khalopenichy, Belarus and was educated at a cheder and a Talmud Torah in Borisov. Chanin became active in the Jewish Labor Bund. Due to his political activities, he was sentenced to eight years in Siberia.

Chanin escaped from Siberia in 1912 and immigrated to America. In America, Chanin supported himself as a hat maker, which led to his involvement in the Cap and Millinery Union. After several years, he became the vice-president of the Cap and Millinery Union.

Following the Jewish Socialist Federation's decision to leave the Socialist Party in 1921, Chanin helped create the Jewish Socialist Verband, which opposed Communism. Chanin was described by Louis Harap as part of the "spearhead of anti-Sovietism in the United States". In 1954, Chanin attacked Communism, arguing that Americans were "completely unaware of the destructive nature of world communism", and defending the Workmen's Circle's efforts to aid Jewish emigration from the Soviet Union. As a result of these efforts, Earl Browder accused him of secretly contributing money to anti-Communist conspiracies within the Soviet Union.

Chanin served as the educational director of the Workmen's Circle from 1936 until 1952. In 1952, he was elected as the Workmen's Circle's General Secretary, replacing Joseph Baskin. He retired from the position of General Secretary in 1963.
