= Joseph Baskin =

Belarusian-born Jewish-American labor activist

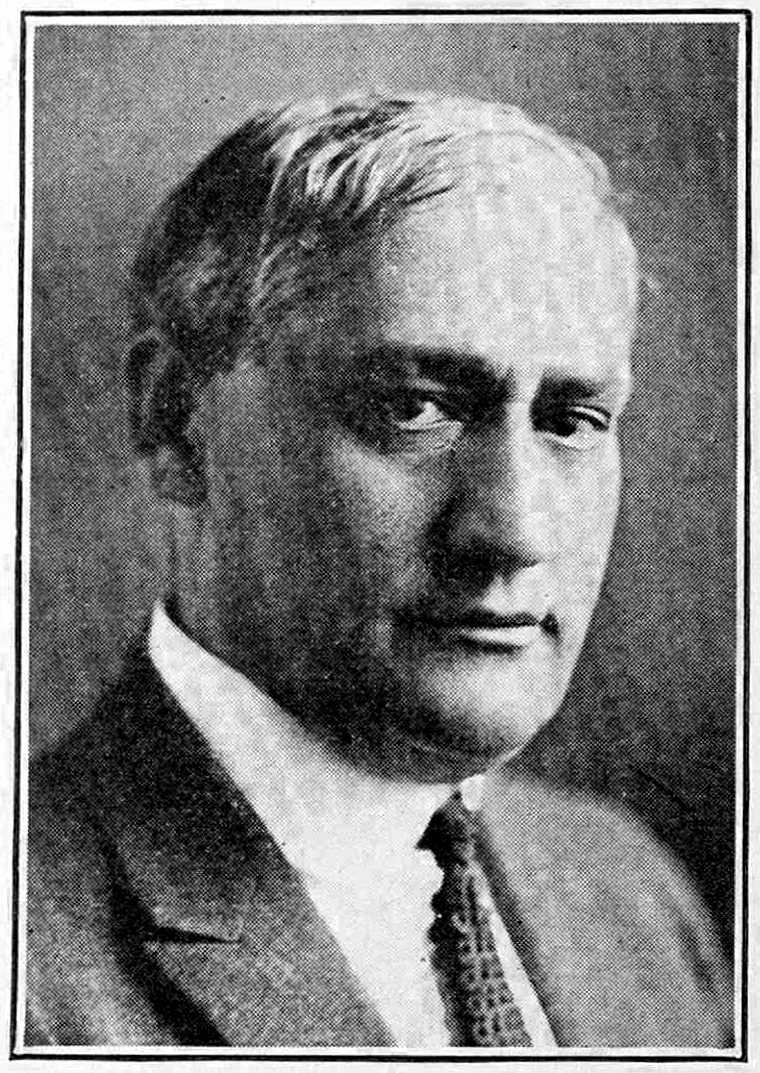
Baskin c. 1936

Joseph Baskin (October 20, 1880 – June 26, 1952) was a Belarusian-born Jewish-American labor activist. He served as general secretary of The Workmen's Circle from 1916 until his death in 1952.

== Life ==
Baskin was born on October 20, 1880, in Biala, Minsk Governorate, Russia, the son of Nachim Mendel and Rose Baskin.

The son of a poor elementary school teacher, Baskin was raised by his father's second wife following the death of his biological mother. He attended religious elementary schools in Biala, Ilya, Hute, and Dolhinov until he was twelve. When he was twelve, while still a Yeshiva student, he became an elementary school teacher for two young boys. He then went to Vilna and studied in Rabbi Yoyel's Yeshiva while working as an assistant synagogue sexton in the cobblers' synagogue. He also studied Russian and secular subjects, and under the influence of his older brother Avrom, who left the Yeshiva to become a laborer, he became a socialist supporter by the age of fifteen. He became a member of the Bund shortly after it formed in 1897, when he was seventeen. He initially engaged in cultural activities among workers and lectured women cigarette makers in secret, illegal meetings.

In 1899, Baskin went to Geneva, Switzerland on a Baron de Hirsch scholarship and attended the Collège de Genève until 1900. He then went to the University of Lausanne in 1901, and in 1905 he graduated from the electrical school of the university of Nancy, France, with a degree in electrical engineering. He then returned to Vilna and became founder and publisher of the Bund's Yiddish daily Folks Zeitung. He was arrested with the rest of the newspaper staff in 1907 for anti-government activities. He immigrated to America later that year and initially worked in an automobile plant in Cleveland, Ohio. He then worked for the Westinghouse Electrical Company in Pittsburgh, Pennsylvania, from 1908 to 1913.

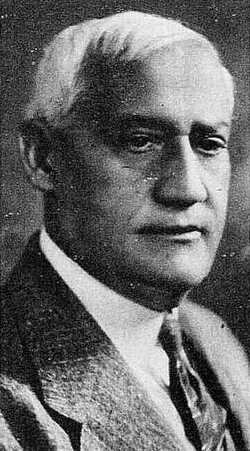
Baskin c. 1948

Baskin remained active in the local Jewish labor movement, but a work-related accident compelled him to stop working and he moved to New York City, New York, where he lived for the rest of his life. He was appointed assistant secretary of the Workmen's Circle in 1914. He then became its general secretary in 1916, serving in that position for the rest of his life. He also edited its publication The Friend until 1924 to 1952, organized the educational, medical, and social services department, and established a home for the aged as well as elementary and intermediate Yiddish schools. As general secretary, he successfully fought against leftists who tried to take control of the Workmen's Circle.

Baskin was active in the Jewish Socialist Federation, ORT, HIAS, the New York Federation of Jewish Philanthropies, the Congress for Jewish Culture, and the National Jewish Welfare Board. He was a founder and secretary of the Jewish Labor Committee and contributed to labor and socialist publications. He married Mary Plotkin in 1918. Their children were Gilbert and Mrs. Geraldine Kuperman.

Baskin died in Beth Israel Hospital after a long illness on June 26, 1952. He was buried in Mount Carmel Cemetery.
