= Didier Pittet =

Swiss infectiologue and epidemiologist

Professor Didier Robert Pittet CBE MD MS

Director, Infection Control Programme, University Hospital of Geneva, Geneva, Switzerland
- Incumbent
- Assumed office 1 January 1992

External Lead, World Health Organization (WHO) Global Patient Safety Challenge "Clean Care is Safer Care" and African Partnerships for Patient Safety
- Incumbent
- Assumed office 1 September 2004

Personal details
- Born: 20 March 1957 (age 69) Geneva, Switzerland
- Education: Collège Calvin
- Alma mater: University of Geneva Faculty of Medicine
- Profession: Physician

Didier Pittet (born 20 March 1957 in Geneva, Switzerland) is a Swiss infectious diseases expert and the director of the Infection Control Programme and WHO Collaborating Centre on Patient Safety, University Hospital of Geneva, Geneva, Switzerland. Since 2005, Pittet is also the External Lead of the World Health Organization (WHO) Global Patient Safety Challenge "Clean Care is Safer Care" and African Partnerships for Patient Safety.

In the 2007 New Year Honours List, Didier Pittet was awarded the Honorary Commander of the Order of the British Empire (CBE) in recognition of his services related to the prevention of healthcare-associated infections in the UK.

== Career ==
Pittet graduated in 1976 from the Collège Calvin secondary school in Geneva, Switzerland. Following a Diploma in Tropical Medicine and Community Health at the University of Geneva Faculty of Medicine, he graduated as M.D. in 1983 from the same institution, and received a master's degree (MS) in Epidemiology and Public Health from the University of Iowa, Iowa City, US, in 1992. Pittet began his career as an infectious diseases expert with a special interest in the intensive care setting and device-associated and yeast infections, but this rapidly expanded to include research in overall hospital epidemiology and infection prevention and control. In 1992, he was appointed as Director of the Infection Control Programme at the University Hospital of Geneva and named Professor of Medicine in 2000 by the University of Geneva Faculty of Medicine.

=== Academic and other posts (selected) ===
Pittet is visiting professor, Division of Investigative Science and School of Medicine, Imperial College London, London, UK; Honorary Professor, 1st Medical School of the Fu, Shanghai, China; Honorary Professor, Faculty of Health and Social Sciences, The Hong Kong Polytechnic University, Hong Kong, SAR, China. Since 2002, Interscience Conference on Antimicrobial Agents and Chemotherapy (ICAAC) Planning Committee member Since 2011, Co-chair, 1st International Conference on Prevention and Infection Control (ICPIC)

== Landmark research ==
Initial observation studies in Geneva by Pittet's team showed a low compliance with basic hand hygiene practices and a lack of awareness by healthcare workers that the main cause of cross-transmission of microorganisms is by hands. Time constraint was identified as the major determinant for poor compliance. The challenge was to facilitate hand hygiene for staff and to find an innovative idea to do so. Under Pittet's leadership, the team investigated concepts from the social sciences to help understand the determinants driving healthcare worker behaviour, which led to the creation of a multimodal strategy based on education, recognition of opportunities for hand hygiene, and feedback on performance where the key component was the introduction of alcohol-based hand rub at the point of care to replace handwashing at the sink ("system change"), thus bypassing the time constraint of the latter method.

== "The Geneva Hand Hygiene Model": a breakthrough intervention ==
The first multimodal intervention ran from 1995 to 2000 at the University of Geneva Hospitals with a spectacular decrease of almost 50% in hospital-associated infections and methicillin-resistant Staphylococcus aureus (MRSA) transmission in parallel with a sustained improvement in compliance with hand hygiene. The methodology and results were published in The Lancet in 2000 and the strategy became known in as "The Geneva Hand Hygiene Model". During 1995–1997, Pittet had applied the same multimodal concept to a prevention strategy targeted at vascular access care and showed that it can decrease these infections and substantially impact on the overall incidence of all intensive care unit-acquired infections. Similarly, interventions to reduce urinary tract infections were successfully applied. Pittet's team also proved the cost-effectiveness of their interventions and long-term sustainability.

== Going global ==
In 2004, Pittet was approached by the WHO World Alliance of Patient Safety to lead the First Global Patient Safety Challenge under the banner "Clean Care is Safer Care". The mandate was to galvanise global commitment to tackle health-care associated infection, which had been identified as a significant area of risk for patients in all United Nations Member States. Hand hygiene was to be the cornerstone of the Challenge. As co-author of the United States Centers for Disease Control and Prevention (CDC) Guidelines for Hand Hygiene, Pittet proposed that WHO Guidelines for Hand Hygiene in Health Care be developed under his leadership in consultation with other international experts. The final version of the Guidelines was published in 2009. In 2008, the infection control programme of the University of Geneva Hospitals and Faculty of Medicine was designated as the first WHO Collaborating Centre for Patient Safety (Infection Control and Improving Practices) in Europe.

The "Geneva Hand Hygiene Model" was used as the basis for the recommended implementation strategy for the global promotion of hand hygiene. As of December 2011, "Clean Care is Safer Care" has been endorsed by ministers of health in over 120 countries worldwide―representing a coverage of more than 90% of the world population. Forty-two countries/networks have already started hand hygiene initiatives using the proposed strategy. Alcohol-based hand rub is promoted actively as the new standard of care, including in resource-poor countries. Pittet's team developed the "Five Moments" concept to explain to healthcare workers the critical moments when hand hygiene must be carried out and this model is currently used worldwide. Save Lives: Clean Your Hands is the Challenge's annual campaign with almost 15,000 hospitals registered from more than 150 countries at the end of December 2011.

== Selected awards and honours ==
- 1999: 1st Ignaz Philipp Semmelweis Research Prize (accomplishments in the field of hand hygiene)
- 1999: The Hygiene Prize 1999 - Rudolf Schülke Foundation (accomplishments in the field of infection control)
- 2002: Society of Health Care Epidemiology of America (SHEA) Young Investigator Award in recognition of outstanding career contributions to infection control and healthcare epidemiology
- 2003: The Lowbury Lecture, Federation of Infection Societies Annual Conference (UK)
- 2005: The Graham Ayliffe Lecture (Hospital Infection Society), UK
- 2007: Honorary Commander of the Order of the British Empire (CBE)
- 2008: Society for Healthcare Epidemiology of America (SHEA) Lectureship
- 2008: Forbes Fellow, Melbourne Infectious Diseases Group (Australia)
- 2009: European Society of Clinical Microbiology and Infectious Diseases (ESCMID) Award for Excellence in Clinical Microbiology and Infectious Diseases
- 2009: Hsu-Li Distinguished Lectureship in Epidemiology, University of Iowa (USA)

== Selected videos ==
- Hand hygiene dance video based on the "My five moments for hand hygiene" concept. "Ô les mains", VigiGerme, Infection Control Programme, University of Geneva Hospitals. 2010.
- Longtin, Yves; Sax, Hugo; Allegranzi, Benedetta; Schneider, Franck; Pittet, Didier (2011). "Hand Hygiene". New England Journal of Medicine. 364 (13): e24. doi:10.1056/NEJMvcm0903599. PMID 21449775.
- Save Lives: Clean Your Hands. Professor Didier Pittet hand hygiene advocacy video – 2011

== Publications ==
Scientific publications by theme

Top ten peer-reviewed publications

Pittet is author/co-author of approximately 500 publications, including 300 peer-reviewed publications and 50 chapters in authoritative medical textbooks.

- Pittet, D; Mourouga, P; Perneger, TV (1999). "Compliance with handwashing in a teaching hospital. Infection Control Program". Annals of Internal Medicine. 130 (2): 126–30. doi:10.7326/0003-4819-130-2-199901190-00006. PMID 10068358. S2CID 53090712.
- Pittet, D; Hugonnet, S; Harbarth, S; Mourouga, P; Sauvan, V; Touveneau, S; Perneger, TV (2000). "Effectiveness of a hospital-wide programme to improve compliance with hand hygiene. Infection Control Programme". The Lancet. 356 (9238): 1307–12. doi:10.1016/S0140-6736(00)02814-2. PMID 11073019. S2CID 18760147.
- Eggimann, P; Harbarth, S; Constantin, MN; Touveneau, S; Chevrolet, JC; Pittet, D (2000). "Impact of a prevention strategy targeted at vascular-access care on incidence of infections acquired in intensive care". The Lancet. 355 (9218): 1864–8. doi:10.1016/S0140-6736(00)02291-1. PMID 10866442. S2CID 35022749.
- Pittet, D; Simon, A; Hugonnet, S; Pessoa-Silva, CL; Sauvan, V; Perneger, TV (2004). "Hand hygiene among physicians: Performance, beliefs, and perceptions". Annals of Internal Medicine. 141 (1): 1–8. doi:10.7326/0003-4819-141-1-200407060-00008. PMID 15238364. S2CID 2654346.
- Ahmed, QA; Memish, ZA; Allegranzi, B; Pittet, D; WHO Global Patient Safety Challenge (2006). "Muslim health-care workers and alcohol-based handrubs". The Lancet. 367 (9515): 1025–7. doi:10.1016/S0140-6736(06)68431-6. PMID 16564366. S2CID 32689292.
- Pessoa-Silva, CL; Hugonnet, S; Pfister, R; Touveneau, S; Dharan, S; Posfay-Barbe, K; Pittet, D (2007). "Reduction of health care associated infection risk in neonates by successful hand hygiene promotion". Pediatrics. 120 (2): e382–90. doi:10.1542/peds.2006-3712. PMID 17664257. S2CID 7745276.
- Sax, H; Allegranzi, B; Uçkay, I; Larson, E; Boyce, J; Pittet, D (2007). "'My five moments for hand hygiene': A user-centred design approach to understand, train, monitor and report hand hygiene". The Journal of Hospital Infection. 67 (1): 9–21. doi:10.1016/j.jhin.2007.06.004. PMID 17719685.
- Harbarth, S; Fankhauser, C; Schrenzel, J; Christenson, J; Gervaz, P; Bandiera-Clerc, C; Renzi, G; Vernaz, N; et al. (2008). "Universal screening for methicillin-resistant Staphylococcus aureus at hospital admission and nosocomial infection in surgical patients". JAMA. 299 (10): 1149–57. doi:10.1001/jama.299.10.1149. PMID 18334690.
- Longtin, Y; Sax, H; Leape, LL; Sheridan, SE; Donaldson, L; Pittet, D (2010). "Patient participation: Current knowledge and applicability to patient safety". Mayo Clinic Proceedings. 85 (1): 53–62. doi:10.4065/mcp.2009.0248. PMC 2800278. PMID 20042562.
- Allegranzi, B; Bagheri Nejad, S; Combescure, C; Graafmans, W; Attar, H; Donaldson, L; Pittet, D (2011). "Burden of endemic health-care-associated infection in developing countries: Systematic review and meta-analysis". The Lancet. 377 (9761): 228–41. Bibcode:2011Lanc..377..228A. doi:10.1016/S0140-6736(10)61458-4. PMID 21146207. S2CID 205960241.

Selected chapters

- Pittet D, Harbarth S. The intensive care unit. In: Hospital Infections. Brachman PS and Bennett JV, eds, 5th ed. Lippincott Williams & Wilkins, Philadelphia; 2007.
- Pittet D, Allegranzi B, Sax H. Hand hygiene. In: Hospital Infections. Brachman PS and Bennett JV, eds, 5th ed. Lippincott Williams & Wilkins, Philadelphia; 2007.
- Allegranzi B, Longtin Y, Pittet D. Infection control in the healthcare setting. In: Control of Communicable Diseases Manual. Heymann DL (ed), 19th ed. American Public Health Association, Washington, DC, USA. 2008.
- Sax H, Pittet D. Severe soft-tissue infections. In: Oh's Manual for Intensive Care Medicine. Bersten A, Sony N, Oh T, eds. 6th ed. Butterworth-Heinemann (Elsevier Ltd), London, UK, chap 63, pp 731–737, 2009.
- Boyce J, Pittet D. Improving hand hygiene in healthcare settings. In: SHEA Practical Handbook for Healthcare Epidemiologists. 3rd ed. Lautenbach E, Woeltje F, Malani PN (eds). University of Chicago Press, 2010.

Infection prevention as a global priority

- Pittet, D (2005). "Clean hands reduce the burden of disease". The Lancet. 366 (9481): 185–7. doi:10.1016/S0140-6736(05)66886-9. PMID 16023493. S2CID 31808770.
- Pittet, D; Donaldson, L (2005). "Clean Care is Safer Care: A worldwide priority". The Lancet. 366 (9493): 1246–7. doi:10.1016/S0140-6736(05)67506-X. PMC 7134620. PMID 16214584.
- Allegranzi, B; Pittet, D (2007). "Healthcare-associated infection in developing countries: Simple solutions to meet complex challenges" (PDF). Infection Control and Hospital Epidemiology. 28 (12): 1323–7. doi:10.1086/521656. PMID 17994510. S2CID 8040407.
- Allegranzi, B; Pittet, D (2008). "Preventing infections acquired during health-care delivery". The Lancet. 372 (9651): 1719–20. doi:10.1016/S0140-6736(08)61715-8. PMID 19013310. S2CID 9575915.
- Kilpatrick, C; Pittet, D (2011). "WHO SAVE LIVES: Clean Your Hands global annual campaign. A call for action: 5 May 2011". Infection. 39 (2): 93–5. doi:10.1007/s15010-011-0106-8. PMC 7103245. PMID 21484356.

Infection and infection prevention in low- and middle-income economies

- Allegranzi, B; Sax, H; Bengaly, L; Richet, H; Minta, DK; Chraiti, MN; Sokona, FM; Gayet-Ageron, A; et al. (2010). "Successful implementation of the World Health Organization hand hygiene improvement strategy in a referral hospital in Mali, Africa". Infection Control and Hospital Epidemiology. 31 (2): 133–41. doi:10.1086/649796. PMID 20017633. S2CID 24443644.
- Nthumba, PM; Stepita-Poenaru, E; Poenaru, D; Bird, P; Allegranzi, B; Pittet, D; Harbarth, S (2010). "Cluster-randomized, crossover trial of the efficacy of plain soap and water versus alcohol-based rub for surgical hand preparation in a rural hospital in Kenya". The British Journal of Surgery. 97 (11): 1621–8. doi:10.1002/bjs.7213. PMID 20878941. S2CID 1738617.
- Barrera, L; Zingg, W; Mendez, F; Pittet, D (2011). "Effectiveness of a hand hygiene promotion strategy using alcohol-based handrub in 6 intensive care units in Colombia". American Journal of Infection Control. 39 (8): 633–9. doi:10.1016/j.ajic.2010.11.004. PMID 21636170.
- Allegranzi, B; Bagheri Nejad, S; Combescure, C; Graafmans, W; Attar, H; Donaldson, L; Pittet, D (2011). "Burden of endemic health-care-associated infection in developing countries: Systematic review and meta-analysis". The Lancet. 377 (9761): 228–41. Bibcode:2011Lanc..377..228A. doi:10.1016/S0140-6736(10)61458-4. PMID 21146207. S2CID 205960241.
- Bagheri Nejad, S; Allegranzi, B; Syed, SB; Ellis, B; Pittet, D (2011). "Health-care-associated infection in Africa: A systematic review". Bulletin of the World Health Organization. 89 (10): 757–65. doi:10.2471/BLT.11.088179. PMC 3209981. PMID 22084514.

Noma, disease of poverty

- Pittet, B; Jaquinet, A; Montandon, D (2001). "Clinical experience in the treatment of noma sequelae". The Journal of Craniofacial Surgery. 12 (3): 273–83. doi:10.1097/00001665-200105000-00014. PMID 11358102. S2CID 28020196.
- Baratti-Mayer, D; Pittet, B; Montandon, D; Bolivar, I; Bornand, JE; Hugonnet, S; Jaquinet, A; Schrenzel, J; et al. (2003). "Noma: An "infectious" disease of unknown aetiology". The Lancet Infectious Diseases. 3 (7): 419–31. doi:10.1016/S1473-3099(03)00670-4. PMID 12837347.
- Baratti-Mayer, D; Pittet, B; Montandon, D (2004). "GESNOMA (Geneva Study Group on Noma): State-of-the-art medical research for humanitarian purposes". Annales de Chirurgie Plastique et Esthétique. 49 (3): 302–5. doi:10.1016/j.anplas.2004.04.005. PMID 15276261.
- Huyghe, A; Francois, P; Charbonnier, Y; Tangomo-Bento, M; Bonetti, EJ; Paster, BJ; Bolivar, I; Baratti-Mayer, D; et al. (2008). "Novel microarray design strategy to study complex bacterial communities". Applied and Environmental Microbiology. 74 (6): 1876–85. Bibcode:2008ApEnM..74.1876H. doi:10.1128/AEM.01722-07. PMC 2268287. PMID 18203854.

Epidemiology, surveillance and international health

- Sax, H; Pittet, D; Swiss-Noso, Network (2002). "Interhospital differences in nosocomial infection rates: Importance of case-mix adjustment". Archives of Internal Medicine. 162 (21): 2437–42. doi:10.1001/archinte.162.21.2437. PMID 12437402.
- Pittet, D; Allegranzi, B; Sax, H; Bertinato, L; Concia, E; Cookson, B; Fabry, J; Richet, H; et al. (2005). "Considerations for a WHO European strategy on health-care-associated infection, surveillance, and control". The Lancet Infectious Diseases. 5 (4): 242–50. doi:10.1016/S1473-3099(05)70055-4. PMC 7128474. PMID 15792742.
- Haustein, T; Hollmeyer, H; Hardiman, M; Harbarth, S; Pittet, D (2011). "Should this event be notified to the World Health Organization? Reliability of the international health regulations notification assessment process". Bulletin of the World Health Organization. 89 (4): 296–303. doi:10.2471/BLT.10.083154. PMC 3066523. PMID 21479094.
- Haustein, T; Gastmeier, P; Holmes, A; Lucet, JC; Shannon, RP; Pittet, D; Harbarth, S (2011). "Use of benchmarking and public reporting for infection control in four high-income countries". The Lancet Infectious Diseases. 11 (6): 471–81. doi:10.1016/S1473-3099(10)70315-7. PMID 21616457.
- Carlet, J; Collignon, P; Goldmann, D; Goossens, H; Gyssens, IC; Harbarth, S; Jarlier, V; Levy, SB; et al. (2011). "Society's failure to protect a precious resource: Antibiotics". The Lancet. 378 (9788): 369–71. doi:10.1016/S0140-6736(11)60401-7. PMID 21477855. S2CID 28275225.

Hand hygiene in healthcare

- Pittet, D; Mourouga, P; Perneger, TV (1999). "Compliance with handwashing in a teaching hospital. Infection Control Program". Annals of Internal Medicine. 130 (2): 126–30. doi:10.7326/0003-4819-130-2-199901190-00006. PMID 10068358. S2CID 53090712.
- Pittet, D; Stéphan, F; Hugonnet, S; Akakpo, C; Souweine, B; Clergue, F (2003). "Hand-cleansing during postanesthesia care". Anesthesiology. 99 (3): 530–5. doi:10.1097/00000542-200309000-00006. PMID 12960535. S2CID 45055178.
- Pittet, D; Sax, H; Hugonnet, S; Harbarth, S (2004). "Cost implications of successful hand hygiene promotion". Infection Control and Hospital Epidemiology. 25 (3): 264–6. doi:10.1086/502389. PMID 15061421. S2CID 129267.
- Pittet, D; Simon, A; Hugonnet, S; Pessoa-Silva, CL; Sauvan, V; Perneger, TV (2004). "Hand hygiene among physicians: Performance, beliefs, and perceptions". Annals of Internal Medicine. 141 (1): 1–8. doi:10.7326/0003-4819-141-1-200407060-00008. PMID 15238364. S2CID 2654346.
- Pittet, D (2005). "Clean hands reduce the burden of disease". The Lancet. 366 (9481): 185–7. doi:10.1016/S0140-6736(05)66886-9. PMID 16023493. S2CID 31808770.

Hand hygiene and Semmelweis

- Pittet, Didier; Boyce, John M (2001). "Hand hygiene and patient care: Pursuing the Semmelweis legacy". The Lancet Infectious Diseases. 1 (1): 9–10. doi:10.1016/S1473-3099(09)70295-6.
- Pittet, Didier (2004). "The crusade against puerperal fever". The Lancet. 363 (9417): 1331–1332. doi:10.1016/S0140-6736(04)16022-4. S2CID 54288715.
- Pittet, D (2004). "The Lowbury lecture: Behaviour in infection control". The Journal of Hospital Infection. 58 (1): 1–13. doi:10.1016/j.jhin.2004.06.002. PMID 15350707.
- Stewardson, A; Allegranzi, B; Sax, H; Kilpatrick, C; Pittet, D (2011). "Back to the future: Rising to the Semmelweis challenge in hand hygiene". Future Microbiology. 6 (8): 855–76. doi:10.2217/FMB.11.66. PMID 21861619.
- Stewardson, A; Pittet, D (2011). "Ignác Semmelweis-celebrating a flawed pioneer of patient safety". The Lancet. 378 (9785): 22–3. doi:10.1016/S0140-6736(11)61007-6. PMID 21739646. S2CID 8179338.

Hand hygiene
dynamics of hand colonisation

- Pittet, D; Dharan, S; Touveneau, S; Sauvan, V; Perneger, TV (1999). "Bacterial contamination of the hands of hospital staff during routine patient care". Archives of Internal Medicine. 159 (8): 821–6. doi:10.1001/archinte.159.8.821. PMID 10219927.
- Pittet, Didier; Kramer, Axel (2002). "Alcohol-based hand gels and hand hygiene in hospitals". The Lancet. 360 (9344): 1511. doi:10.1016/S0140-6736(02)11447-4. S2CID 205939207.
- Pessoa-Silva, CL; Dharan, S; Hugonnet, S; Touveneau, S; Posfay-Barbe, K; Pfister, R; Pittet, D (2004). "Dynamics of bacterial hand contamination during routine neonatal care" (PDF). Infection Control and Hospital Epidemiology. 25 (3): 192–7. doi:10.1086/502376. PMID 15061408. S2CID 26375668.
- Pittet, D; Allegranzi, B; Sax, H; Dharan, S; Pessoa-Silva, CL; Donaldson, L; Boyce, JM; Who Global Patient Safety Challenge, World Alliance for Patient Safety (2006). "Evidence-based model for hand transmission during patient care and the role of improved practices". The Lancet Infectious Diseases. 6 (10): 641–52. doi:10.1016/S1473-3099(06)70600-4. PMID 17008173.
- Rotter, M; Sattar, S; Dharan, S; Allegranzi, B; Mathai, E; Pittet, D (2009). "Methods to evaluate the microbicidal activities of hand-rub and hand-wash agents". The Journal of Hospital Infection. 73 (3): 191–9. doi:10.1016/j.jhin.2009.06.024. PMID 19729223.

Hand hygiene
alcohol-based handrubs as the universal gold standard

- Hugonnet, S; Perneger, TV; Pittet, D (2002). "Alcohol-based handrub improves compliance with hand hygiene in intensive care units". Archives of Internal Medicine. 162 (9): 1037–43. doi:10.1001/archinte.162.9.1037. PMID 11996615.
- Kramer, A; Rudolph, P; Kampf, G; Pittet, D (2002). "Limited efficacy of alcohol-based hand gels". The Lancet. 359 (9316): 1489–90. doi:10.1016/S0140-6736(02)08426-X. PMID 11988252. S2CID 30450670.
- Ahmed, QA; Memish, ZA; Allegranzi, B; Pittet, D; WHO Global Patient Safety Challenge (2006). "Muslim health-care workers and alcohol-based handrubs". The Lancet. 367 (9515): 1025–7. doi:10.1016/S0140-6736(06)68431-6. PMID 16564366. S2CID 32689292.
- Pittet, D; Allegranzi, B; Sax, H; Chraiti, MN; Griffiths, W; Richet, H; World Health Organization Global Patient Safety Challenge Alcohol-Based Handrub Task Force (2007). "Double-blind, randomized, crossover trial of 3 hand rub formulations: Fast-track evaluation of tolerability and acceptability". Infection Control and Hospital Epidemiology. 28 (12): 1344–51. doi:10.1086/523272. PMID 17994514. S2CID 33987958.
- Widmer, AF; Rotter, M; Voss, A; Nthumba, P; Allegranzi, B; Boyce, J; Pittet, D (2010). "Surgical hand preparation: State-of-the-art". The Journal of Hospital Infection. 74 (2): 112–22. doi:10.1016/j.jhin.2009.06.020. PMID 19716627.

Hand hygiene guidelines

- Boyce, JM; Pittet, D; Healthcare Infection Control Practices Advisory Committee; HICPAC/SHEA/APIC/IDSA Hand Hygiene Task Force (2002). "Guideline for Hand Hygiene in Health-Care Settings. Recommendations of the Healthcare Infection Control Practices Advisory Committee and the HICPAC/SHEA/APIC/IDSA Hand Hygiene Task Force. Society for Healthcare Epidemiology of America/Association for Professionals in Infection Control/Infectious Diseases Society of America". MMWR. Recommendations and Reports. 51 (RR–16): 1–45, quiz CE1–4. PMID 12418624.
- Pittet, Didier; Boyce, John M (2003). "Revolutionising hand hygiene in health-care settings: Guidelines revisited". The Lancet Infectious Diseases. 3 (5): 269–70. doi:10.1016/S1473-3099(03)00601-7. PMID 12726970.
- WHO Guidelines for Hand Hygiene in Health Care (Advanced Draft). World Health Organization, Geneva, 2006
- Cookson, B; Mathai, E; Allegranzi, B; Pessoa-Silva, CL; Bagheri Nejad, S; Schneider, A; Tschopp, C; Wendt, C; Pittet, D (2009). "Comparison of national and subnational guidelines for hand hygiene". The Journal of Hospital Infection. 72 (3): 202–10. doi:10.1016/j.jhin.2009.03.022. PMC 7132489. PMID 19481295.
- WHO Guidelines for Hand Hygiene in Health Care (Advanced Draft). World Health Organization, Geneva, 2009.

Hand hygiene education

- Sax, H.; Allegranzi, B.; Uçkay, I.; Larson, E.; Boyce, J.; Pittet, D. (2007). "'My five moments for hand hygiene': A user-centred design approach to understand, train, monitor and report hand hygiene". Journal of Hospital Infection. 67 (1): 9–21. doi:10.1016/j.jhin.2007.06.004. PMID 17719685.
- Whitby, M.; Pessoa-Silva, C.L.; McLaws, M.-L.; Allegranzi, B.; Sax, H.; Larson, E.; Seto, W.H.; Donaldson, L.; Pittet, D. (2007). "Behavioural considerations for hand hygiene practices: The basic building blocks". Journal of Hospital Infection. 65 (1): 1–8. doi:10.1016/j.jhin.2006.09.026. PMID 17145101.
- Allegranzi, B; Memish, ZA; Donaldson, L; Pittet, D; World Health Organization Global Patient Safety Challenge Task Force on Religious Cultural Aspects of Hand Hygiene; World Alliance for Patient Safety (2009). "Religion and culture: Potential undercurrents influencing hand hygiene promotion in health care". American Journal of Infection Control. 37 (1): 28–34. doi:10.1016/j.ajic.2008.01.014. PMC 7115273. PMID 18834738.
- Sax, H; Allegranzi, B; Chraïti, MN; Boyce, J; Larson, E; Pittet, D (2009). "The World Health Organization hand hygiene observation method". American Journal of Infection Control. 37 (10): 827–34. doi:10.1016/j.ajic.2009.07.003. PMID 20004812.
- Longtin, Yves; Sax, Hugo; Allegranzi, Benedetta; Schneider, Franck; Pittet, Didier (2011). "Hand Hygiene". New England Journal of Medicine. 364 (13): e24. doi:10.1056/NEJMvcm0903599. PMID 21449775.

Patients as partners in care

- Longtin, Yves; Sax, Hugo; Allegranzi, Benedetta; Hugonnet, Stéphane; Pittet, Didier (2009). "Patients' Beliefs and Perceptions of Their Participation to Increase Healthcare Worker Compliance with Hand Hygiene". Infection Control and Hospital Epidemiology. 30 (9): 830–9. doi:10.1086/599118. PMID 19642899. S2CID 205990941.
- Longtin, Y; Akakpo, C; Rutschmann, OT; Pittet, D; Sax, H (2009). "Evaluation of patients' mask use after the implementation of cough etiquette in the emergency department". Infection Control and Hospital Epidemiology. 30 (9): 904–8. doi:10.1086/605471. PMID 19622049. S2CID 205992013.
- Longtin, Yves; Sax, Hugo; Leape, Lucian L.; Sheridan, Susan E.; Donaldson, Liam; Pittet, Didier (2010). "Patient Participation: Current Knowledge and Applicability to Patient Safety". Mayo Clinic Proceedings. 85 (1): 53–62. doi:10.4065/mcp.2009.0248. PMC 2800278. PMID 20042562.
- McGuckin, M; Storr, J; Longtin, Y; Allegranzi, B; Pittet, D (2011). "Patient empowerment and multimodal hand hygiene promotion: A win-win strategy". American Journal of Medical Quality (Submitted manuscript). 26 (1): 10–7. doi:10.1177/1062860610373138. PMID 20576998. S2CID 4891539.
- Pittet, D.; Panesar, S.S.; Wilson, K.; Longtin, Y.; Morris, T.; Allan, V.; Storr, J.; Cleary, K.; Donaldson, L. (2011). "Involving the patient to ask about hospital hand hygiene: A National Patient Safety Agency feasibility study". Journal of Hospital Infection. 77 (4): 299–303. doi:10.1016/j.jhin.2010.10.013. PMID 21236515.

Multimodal interventions to reduce infections

- Pittet, Didier; Hugonnet, Stéphane; Harbarth, Stephan; Mourouga, Philippe; Sauvan, Valérie; Touveneau, Sylvie; Perneger, Thomas V (2000). "Effectiveness of a hospital-wide programme to improve compliance with hand hygiene". The Lancet. 356 (9238): 1307–12. doi:10.1016/S0140-6736(00)02814-2. PMID 11073019. S2CID 18760147.
- Eggimann, P; Harbarth, S; Constantin, MN; Touveneau, S; Chevrolet, JC; Pittet, D (2000). "Impact of a prevention strategy targeted at vascular-access care on incidence of infections acquired in intensive care". The Lancet. 355 (9218): 1864–8. doi:10.1016/S0140-6736(00)02291-1. PMID 10866442. S2CID 35022749.
- Stephan, F.; Sax, H.; Wachsmuth, M.; Hoffmeyer, P.; Clergue, F.; Pittet, D. (2006). "Reduction of Urinary Tract Infection and Antibiotic Use after Surgery: A Controlled, Prospective, Before-After Intervention Study". Clinical Infectious Diseases. 42 (11): 1544–51. doi:10.1086/503837. PMID 16652311.
- Pessoa-Silva, C. L.; Hugonnet, S.; Pfister, R.; Touveneau, S.; Dharan, S.; Posfay-Barbe, K.; Pittet, D. (2007). "Reduction of Health Care Associated Infection Risk in Neonates by Successful Hand Hygiene Promotion". Pediatrics. 120 (2): e382–90. doi:10.1542/peds.2006-3712. PMID 17664257. S2CID 7745276.
- Allegranzi, B; Sax, H; Bengaly, L; Richet, H; Minta, DK; Chraiti, MN; Sokona, FM; Gayet-Ageron, A; et al. (2010). "Successful implementation of the World Health Organization hand hygiene improvement strategy in a referral hospital in Mali, Africa". Infection Control and Hospital Epidemiology. 31 (2): 133–41. doi:10.1086/649796. PMID 20017633. S2CID 24443644.

Nosocomial bloodstream infection

- Pittet, D.; Tarara, D.; Wenzel, R. P. (1994). "Nosocomial Bloodstream Infection in Critically III Patients: Excess Length of Stay, Extra Costs, and Attributable Mortality". JAMA: The Journal of the American Medical Association. 271 (20): 1598–601. doi:10.1001/jama.1994.03510440058033. PMID 8182812.
- Pittet, D; Wenzel, RP (1995). "Nosocomial bloodstream infections. Secular trends in rates, mortality, and contribution to total hospital deaths". Archives of Internal Medicine. 155 (11): 1177–84. doi:10.1001/archinte.1995.00430110089009. hdl:1765/7611. PMID 7763123.
- Pittet, Didier; Li, Ning; Woolson, Robert F.; Wenzel, Richard P. (1997). "Microbiological Factors Influencing the Outcome of Nosocomial Bloodstream Infections: A 6-Year Validated, Population-Based Model". Clinical Infectious Diseases. 24 (6): 1068–78. doi:10.1086/513640. JSTOR 4460006. PMID 9195059.
- Hugonnet, S; Sax, H; Eggimann, P; Chevrolet, JC; Pittet, D (2004). "Nosocomial bloodstream infection and clinical sepsis". Emerging Infectious Diseases. 10 (1): 76–81. doi:10.3201/eid1001.030407. PMC 3322756. PMID 15078600.
- Hugonnet, Stéphane; Harbarth, Stephan; Ferrière, Karin; Ricou, Bara; Suter, Peter; Pittet, Didier (2003). "Bacteremic sepsis in intensive care: Temporal trends in incidence, organ dysfunction, and prognosis". Critical Care Medicine. 31 (2): 390–4. doi:10.1097/01.CCM.0000045026.81584.6F. PMID 12576941. S2CID 22326570.

Catheter-associated infections

- Widmer, A. F.; Pittet, D. (1992). "Optimal Duration of Therapy for Catheter-Related Staphylococcus aureus Bacteremia". Clinical Infectious Diseases. 14 (6): 1259–60. doi:10.1093/clinids/14.6.1259. PMID 1623083.
- Eggimann, P; Harbarth, S; Constantin, MN; Touveneau, S; Chevrolet, JC; Pittet, D (2000). "Impact of a prevention strategy targeted at vascular-access care on incidence of infections acquired in intensive care". The Lancet. 355 (9218): 1864–8. doi:10.1016/S0140-6736(00)02291-1. PMID 10866442. S2CID 35022749.
- Eggimann, P; Hugonnet, S; Sax, H; Harbarth, S; Chevrolet, JC; Pittet, D (2005). "Long-term reduction of vascular access-associated bloodstream infection". Annals of Internal Medicine. 142 (10): 875–6. doi:10.7326/0003-4819-142-10-200505170-00025. PMID 15897546.
- Zingg, W.; Sax, H.; Inan, C.; Cartier, V.; Diby, M.; Clergue, F.; Pittet, D.; Walder, B. (2009). "Hospital-wide surveillance of catheter-related bloodstream infection: From the expected to the unexpected". Journal of Hospital Infection. 73 (1): 41–6. doi:10.1016/j.jhin.2009.05.015. PMID 19646788.
- Perencevich, E. N.; Pittet, D. (2009). "Preventing Catheter-Related Bloodstream Infections: Thinking Outside the Checklist". JAMA: The Journal of the American Medical Association. 301 (12): 1285–7. doi:10.1001/jama.2009.420. PMID 19318658.

Ventilator-associated pneumonia

- Fischer, Joachim E; Janousek, Martin; Nadal, David; Fanconi, Sergio (1998). "Diagnostic techniques for ventilator-associated pneumonia". The Lancet. 352 (9133): 1066–7. doi:10.1016/S0140-6736(05)60107-9. PMID 9759780. S2CID 42304732.
- Pittet, Didier; Bonten, Marc JM (2000). "Towards invasive diagnostic techniques as standard management of ventilator-associated pneumonia". The Lancet. 356 (9233): 874. doi:10.1016/S0140-6736(00)02675-1. PMID 11036890. S2CID 3088752.
- Pittet, D; Eggimann, P; Rubinovitch, B (2001). "Prevention of ventilator-associated pneumonia by oral decontamination: Just another SDD study?". American Journal of Respiratory and Critical Care Medicine. 164 (3): 338–9. doi:10.1164/ajrccm.164.3.2105072b. PMID 11500329.
- Hugonnet, Stephane; Eggimann, Philippe; Borst, Francois; Maricot, Patrice; Chevrolet, Jean-Claude; Pittet, Didier (2004). "Impact of Ventilator-Associated Pneumonia on Resource Utilization and Patient Outcome •" (PDF). Infection Control and Hospital Epidemiology. 25 (12): 1090–6. doi:10.1086/502349. PMID 15636298. S2CID 21670508.
- Kollef, M; Pittet, D; Sánchez García, M; Chastre, J; Fagon, JY; Bonten, M; Hyzy, R; Fleming, TR; et al. (2006). "A randomized double-blind trial of iseganan in prevention of ventilator-associated pneumonia". American Journal of Respiratory and Critical Care Medicine. 173 (1): 91–7. doi:10.1164/rccm.200504-656OC. PMID 16192451.
- Uc Kay, I.; Ahmed, Q. A.; Sax, H.; Pittet, D. (2008). "Ventilator-Associated Pneumonia as a Quality Indicator for Patient Safety?". Clinical Infectious Diseases. 46 (4): 557–63. doi:10.1086/526534. PMID 18199039.
- Pittet, D; Zingg, W (2010). "Reducing ventilator-associated pneumonia: When process control allows outcome improvement and even benchmarking". Critical Care Medicine. 38 (3): 983–4. doi:10.1097/CCM.0b013e3181c8fd0c. PMID 20168154.

Infections in the critically ill

- Pittet, D; Thiévent, B; Wenzel, RP; Li, N; Auckenthaler, R; Suter, PM (1996). "Bedside prediction of mortality from bacteremic sepsis. A dynamic analysis of ICU patients". American Journal of Respiratory and Critical Care Medicine. 153 (2): 684–93. doi:10.1164/ajrccm.153.2.8564118. PMID 8564118.
- Harbarth, S; Holeckova, K; Froidevaux, C; Pittet, D; Ricou, B; Grau, GE; Vadas, L; Pugin, J; Geneva Sepsis, Network (2001). "Diagnostic value of procalcitonin, interleukin-6, and interleukin-8 in critically ill patients admitted with suspected sepsis". American Journal of Respiratory and Critical Care Medicine. 164 (3): 396–402. doi:10.1164/ajrccm.164.3.2009052. PMID 11500339.
- Hugonnet, S; Eggimann, P; Sax, H; Touveneau, S; Chevrolet, JC; Pittet, D (2002). "Intensive care unit-acquired infections: Is postdischarge surveillance useful?". Critical Care Medicine. 30 (12): 2636–8. doi:10.1097/00003246-200212000-00004. PMID 12483051. S2CID 44340854.
- Eggimann, P; Harbarth, S; Ricou, B; Hugonnet, S; Ferriere, K; Suter, P; Pittet, D (2003). "Acute respiratory distress syndrome after bacteremic sepsis does not increase mortality". American Journal of Respiratory and Critical Care Medicine. 167 (9): 1210–4. doi:10.1164/rccm.200210-1196OC. PMID 12615616.
- Hugonnet, S; Chevrolet, JC; Pittet, D (2007). "The effect of workload on infection risk in critically ill patients". Critical Care Medicine. 35 (1): 76–81. doi:10.1097/01.CCM.0000251125.08629.3F. PMID 17095946. S2CID 26075308.
- Hugonnet, S; Villaveces, A; Pittet, D (2007). "Nurse staffing level and nosocomial infections: Empirical evaluation of the case-crossover and case-time-control designs". American Journal of Epidemiology. 165 (11): 1321–7. doi:10.1093/aje/kwm041. PMID 17400571.

Systemic inflammatory response syndrome (SIRS), sepsis, severe sepsis and their cascades

- Pittet, D; Rangel-Frausto, S; Li, N; Tarara, D; Costigan, M; Rempe, L; Jebson, P; Wenzel, RP (1995). "Systemic inflammatory response syndrome, sepsis, severe sepsis and septic shock: Incidence, morbidities and outcomes in surgical ICU patients". Intensive Care Medicine. 21 (4): 302–9. doi:10.1007/BF01705408. PMID 7650252. S2CID 36497077.
- Rangel-Frausto, M. S.; Pittet, D.; Costigan, M.; Hwang, T.; Davis, C. S.; Wenzel, R. P. (1995). "The Natural History of the Systemic Inflammatory Response Syndrome (SIRS) A Prospective Study". JAMA: The Journal of the American Medical Association. 273 (2): 117–23. doi:10.1001/jama.1995.03520260039030. PMID 7799491.
- Rangel-Frausto, M. Sigfrido; Pittet, Didier; Hwang, Taekyu; Woolson, Robert F.; Wenzel, Richard P. (1998). "The Dynamics of Disease Progression in Sepsis: Markov Modeling Describing the Natural History and the Likely Impact of Effective Antisepsis Agents". Clinical Infectious Diseases. 27 (1): 185–90. doi:10.1086/514630. PMID 9675475.
- Pittet, D; Harbarth, S; Suter, PM; Reinhart, K; Leighton, A; Barker, C; MacDonald, F; Abraham, E (1999). "Impact of immunomodulating therapy on morbidity in patients with severe sepsis". American Journal of Respiratory and Critical Care Medicine. 160 (3): 852–7. doi:10.1164/ajrccm.160.3.9809033. PMID 10471608.
- Harbarth, S; Garbino, J; Pugin, J; Romand, JA; Lew, D; Pittet, D (2003). "Inappropriate initial antimicrobial therapy and its effect on survival in a clinical trial of immunomodulating therapy for severe sepsis". The American Journal of Medicine. 115 (7): 529–35. doi:10.1016/j.amjmed.2003.07.005. PMID 14599631.

Infections due to Candida spp.

- Pittet, D; Monod, M; Filthuth, I; Frenk, E; Suter, PM; Auckenthaler, R (1991). "Contour-clamped homogeneous electric field gel electrophoresis as a powerful epidemiologic tool in yeast infections". The American Journal of Medicine. 91 (3B): 256S–263S. doi:10.1016/0002-9343(91)90378-B. PMID 1928173.
- Pittet, D; Monod, M; Suter, PM; Frenk, E; Auckenthaler, R (1994). "Candida colonization and subsequent infections in critically ill surgical patients". Annals of Surgery. 220 (6): 751–8. doi:10.1097/00000658-199412000-00008. PMC 1234477. PMID 7986142.
- Garbino, J; Lew, DP; Romand, JA; Hugonnet, S; Auckenthaler, R; Pittet, D (2002). "Prevention of severe Candida infections in nonneutropenic, high-risk, critically ill patients: A randomized, double-blind, placebo-controlled trial in patients treated by selective digestive decontamination". Intensive Care Medicine. 28 (12): 1708–17. doi:10.1007/s00134-002-1540-y. PMID 12447512. S2CID 21354331.
- Garbino, J; Kolarova, L; Rohner, P; Lew, D; Pichna, P; Pittet, D (2002). "Secular trends of candidemia over 12 years in adult patients at a tertiary care hospital". Medicine. 81 (6): 425–33. doi:10.1097/00005792-200211000-00003. PMID 12441899. S2CID 8687299.
- Eggimann, P; Garbino, J; Pittet, D (2003). "Epidemiology of Candida species infections in critically ill non-immunosuppressed patients". The Lancet Infectious Diseases. 3 (11): 685–702. doi:10.1016/S1473-3099(03)00801-6. PMID 14592598.
- Eggimann, P; Garbino, J; Pittet, D (2003). "Management of Candida species infections in critically ill patients". The Lancet Infectious Diseases. 3 (12): 772–85. doi:10.1016/S1473-3099(03)00831-4. PMID 14652203.

Epidemiology of Methicillin-resistant Staphylococcus aureus

- Harbarth, S; Rutschmann, O; Sudre, P; Pittet, D (1998). "Impact of methicillin resistance on the outcome of patients with bacteremia caused by Staphylococcus aureus". Archives of Internal Medicine. 158 (2): 182–9. doi:10.1001/archinte.158.2.182. PMID 9448557.
- Harbarth, S; François, P; Shrenzel, J; Fankhauser-Rodriguez, C; Hugonnet, S; Koessler, T; Huyghe, A; Pittet, D (2005). "Community-associated methicillin-resistant Staphylococcus aureus, Switzerland". Emerging Infectious Diseases. 11 (6): 962–5. doi:10.3201/eid1106.041308. PMC 3367580. PMID 15963298.
- Harbarth, S; Sax, H; Fankhauser-Rodriguez, C; Schrenzel, J; Agostinho, A; Pittet, D (2006). "Evaluating the probability of previously unknown carriage of MRSA at hospital admission". The American Journal of Medicine. 119 (3): 275.e15–23. doi:10.1016/j.amjmed.2005.04.042. PMID 16490475.
- De Angelis, G; Francois, P; Lee, A; Schrenzel, J; Renzi, G; Girard, M; Pittet, D; Harbarth, S (2011). "Molecular and epidemiological evaluation of strain replacement in patients previously harboring gentamicin-resistant MRSA". Journal of Clinical Microbiology. 49 (11): 3880–4. doi:10.1128/JCM.01061-11. PMC 3209128. PMID 21918027.
- Lee, A. S.; Macedo-Vinas, M.; Francois, P.; Renzi, G.; Schrenzel, J.; Vernaz, N.; Pittet, D.; Harbarth, S. (2011). "Impact of Combined Low-Level Mupirocin and Genotypic Chlorhexidine Resistance on Persistent Methicillin-Resistant Staphylococcus aureus Carriage After Decolonization Therapy: A Case-control Study". Clinical Infectious Diseases. 52 (12): 1422–30. doi:10.1093/cid/cir233. PMID 21628482.

Control of methicillin-resistant Staphylococcus aureus

- Harbarth, S; Dharan, S; Liassine, N; Herrault, P; Auckenthaler, R; Pittet, D (1999). "Randomized, placebo-controlled, double-blind trial to evaluate the efficacy of mupirocin for eradicating carriage of methicillin-resistant Staphylococcus aureus". Antimicrobial Agents and Chemotherapy. 43 (6): 1412–6. doi:10.1128/AAC.43.6.1412. PMC 89288. PMID 10348762.
- Boyce, J; Cookson, B; Christiansen, K; Hori, S; Vuopiovarkila, J; Kocagoz, S; Oztop, A; Vandenbrouckegrauls, C; et al. (2005). "Meticillin-resistant". The Lancet Infectious Diseases. 5 (10): 653–63. doi:10.1016/S1473-3099(05)70243-7. PMC 7128555. PMID 16183520.
- Harbarth, Stephan; Masuet-Aumatell, Cristina; Schrenzel, Jacques; Francois, Patrice; Akakpo, Christophe; Renzi, Gesuele; Pugin, Jerome; Ricou, Bara; Pittet, Didier (2006). "Evaluation of rapid screening and pre-emptive contact isolation for detecting and controlling methicillin-resistant Staphylococcus aureus in critical care: An interventional cohort study". Critical Care. 10 (1): R25. doi:10.1186/cc3982. PMC 1550853. PMID 16469125.
- Harbarth, S.; Fankhauser, C.; Schrenzel, J.; Christenson, J.; Gervaz, P.; Bandiera-Clerc, C.; Renzi, G.; Vernaz, N.; et al. (2008). "Universal Screening for Methicillin-Resistant Staphylococcus aureus at Hospital Admission and Nosocomial Infection in Surgical Patients". JAMA: The Journal of the American Medical Association. 299 (10): 1149–57. doi:10.1001/jama.299.10.1149. PMID 18334690.
- Murthy, A.; De Angelis, G.; Pittet, D.; Schrenzel, J.; Uckay, I.; Harbarth, S. (2010). "Cost-effectiveness of universal MRSA screening on admission to surgery". Clinical Microbiology and Infection. 16 (12): 1747–53. doi:10.1111/j.1469-0691.2010.03220.x. PMID 20331684.

Paediatric infection control

- Pessoa-Silva, CL; Hugonnet, S; Pfister, R; Touveneau, S; Dharan, S; Posfay-Barbe, K; Pittet, D (2007). "Reduction of health care associated infection risk in neonates by successful hand hygiene promotion". Pediatrics. 120 (2): e382–90. doi:10.1542/peds.2006-3712. PMID 17664257. S2CID 7745276.
- Posfay-Barbe, KM; Zerr, DM; Pittet, D (2008). "Infection control in paediatrics". The Lancet Infectious Diseases. 8 (1): 19–31. doi:10.1016/S1473-3099(07)70310-9. PMID 18156087.
- Zingg, W; Posfay-Barbe, KM; Pittet, D (2008). "Healthcare-associated infections in neonates". Current Opinion in Infectious Diseases. 21 (3): 228–34. doi:10.1097/QCO.0b013e3282fcec5f. PMID 18448966. S2CID 38412595.
- Longtin, Y; Troillet, N; Touveneau, S; Boillat, N; Rimensberger, P; Dharan, S; Gervaix, A; Pittet, D; Harbarth, S (2010). "Pseudomonas aeruginosa outbreak in a pediatric intensive care unit linked to a humanitarian organization residential center". The Pediatric Infectious Disease Journal. 29 (3): 233–7. doi:10.1097/INF.0b013e3181bc24fb. PMID 19940801. S2CID 26097588.
- Zingg, Walter; Posfay-Barbe, Klara M.; Pfister, Riccardo E.; Touveneau, Sylvie; Pittet, Didier (2011). "Individualized Catheter Surveillance among Neonates: A Prospective, 8-Year, Single-Center Experience" (PDF). Infection Control and Hospital Epidemiology. 32 (1): 42–9. doi:10.1086/657634. PMID 21121817. S2CID 35700208.

Bone and foreign body infections

- Pittet, D; Wyssa, B; Herter-Clavel, C; Kursteiner, K; Vaucher, J; Lew, PD (1999). "Outcome of diabetic foot infections treated conservatively: A retrospective cohort study with long-term follow-up". Archives of Internal Medicine. 159 (8): 851–6. doi:10.1001/archinte.159.8.851. PMID 10219931.
- Pittet, B; Montandon, D; Pittet, D (2005). "Infection in breast implants". The Lancet Infectious Diseases. 5 (2): 94–106. doi:10.1016/S1473-3099(05)01281-8. PMID 15680779.
- Uçkay, I; Harbarth, S; Peter, R; Lew, D; Hoffmeyer, P; Pittet, D (2010). "Preventing surgical site infections". Expert Review of Anti-infective Therapy. 8 (6): 657–70. doi:10.1586/eri.10.41. PMID 20521894. S2CID 2511048.
- Uçkay, I; Harbarth, S; Ferry, T; Lübbeke, A; Emonet, S; Hoffmeyer, P; Pittet, D (2011). "Meticillin resistance in orthopaedic coagulase-negative staphylococcal infections". The Journal of Hospital Infection. 79 (3): 248–53. doi:10.1016/j.jhin.2011.06.014. PMID 21955452.
- Uçkay, I; Lübbeke, A; Harbarth, S; Emonet, S; Tovmirzaeva, L; Agostinho, A; Longtin, Y; Peter, R; et al. (2012). "Low risk despite high endemicity of methicillin-resistant Staphylococcus aureus infections following elective total joint arthroplasty: A 12-year experience". Annals of Medicine. 44 (4): 360–8. doi:10.3109/07853890.2010.550932. PMID 21352084. S2CID 34541921.
- World Health Organization Clean Care is Safer Care and SaveLives: CleanYourHands
- World Health Organization African Partnerships for Patient Safety

== See also ==
- Hand washing

== Bibliography ==
- (in French) Thierry Crouzet, Le geste qui sauve, Éditions l'Âge d'homme, 2014, 172 pages (ISBN 978-2825144008).
